= Poland national under-19 speedway team =

Poland
- Nickname(s): Biało-czerwoni ("The white and reds"); Białe Orły ("The White Eagles")
- Association: Polish Motor Union; Polski Związek Motorowy
- FIM code: PZM
- Team manager: Marek Cieślak
- Team captain: Maciej Janowski

European Championships
| Team U-19 | 2 | — | — |
- Best result: Champion title (last time in 2010)
| Individual U-19 | 6 | 7 | 3 |
- Best result: Champion title (last time in 2009)

The Poland national under-19 speedway team is the national under-19 motorcycle speedway team of Poland and is controlled by the Polish Motor Union (PZM). The team has won the Team Speedway Junior European Championship twice in 2009 and 2010. In the Individual competition was won by Poles six times: Rafał Okoniewski (1998, 1999), Łukasz Romanek (2001), Karol Ząbik (2005), Artur Mroczka (2008) and Przemysław Pawlicki (2009).

== Competition ==
Team Speedway Junior European Championship
| Year | Venue | Place | Pts. | Riders |
|---|---|---|---|---|
| 2008 | (Poland) Rawicz | 4 | 26 | Maciej Janowski (15), Dawid Lampart (7), Marcel Kajzer (2), Borys Miturski (2), Michał Łopaczewski (0) |
| 2009 | (Denmark) Grindsted | 1st | 40 | Maciej Janowski (15), Przemysław Pawlicki (15), Dawid Lampart (7), Patryk Dudek (2), Sławomir Musielak (1) |
| 2010 | (Czech Republic) Divišov | 1st | 40 | Maciej Janowski (15), Patryk Dudek (15), Przemysław Pawlicki (14), Patryk Gomólski (12), Łukasz Cyran (0) |

Individual Speedway Junior European Championship
| Year | Venue | Medal(s) | Riders |
|---|---|---|---|
| 1998 | (Slovenia) Krško | 1st | Rafał Okoniewski (1st), Krzysztof Cegielski (4th), Mariusz Węgrzyk (7th), Sebastian Smoter (10th), Paweł Duszyński (11th), Tomasz Chrzanowski (12th) |
| 1999 | (Poland) Gniezno | 1st 2nd 3rd | Rafał Okoniewski (1st), Karol Malecha (2nd), Jarosław Hampel (3rd), Tomasz Chrzanowski (4th), Krzysztof Mikuta (8th), Andrzej Zieja (9th) |
| 2000 | (Slovenia) Ljubljana | 3rd | Zbigniew Czerwiński (3rd), Łukasz Pawlikowski (9th), Sebastian Smoter (10th), Tomasz Kwiatkowski (12th), Łukasz Stanisławski (17th), Michał Aszenberg (18th) |
| 2001 | (Czech Republic) Pardubice | 1st 2nd | Łukasz Romanek (1st), Rafał Kurmański (2nd), Zbigniew Czerwiński (6th), Krzysztof Kasprzak (10th), Łukasz Stanisławski (12th) |
| 2002 | (Latvia) Daugavpils | — | Marek Cieślewicz (4th), Krzysztof Kasprzak (5th), Robert Miśkowiak (8th), Piotr Świderski (12th), Łukasz Romanek (16th) |
| 2003 | (Germany) Pocking | 2nd | Janusz Kołodziej (2nd), Marcin Rempała (5th), Mirosław Jabłoński (6th), Paweł Hlib (11th), Krzysztof Buczkowski (12th), Adrian Miedziński (15th) |
| 2004 | (Poland) Rybnik | 2nd | Karol Ząbik (2nd), Paweł Hlib (7th), Krzysztof Buczkowski (9th), Adrian Miedziński (13th), Mirosław Jabłoński (14th) |
| 2005 | (Czech Republic) Mšeno | 1st | Karol Ząbik (1st), Paweł Hlib (4th), Krzysztof Buczkowski (6th), Patryk Pawłaszczyk (13th), Marcin Jędrzejewski (18th) |
| 2006 | (Croatia) Goričan | — | Adrian Gomólski (4th), Marcin Jędrzejewski (8th), Mateusz Szczepaniak (11th), Sławomir Dąbrowski (14th), Sebastian Brucheiser (—) |
| 2007 | (Poland) Częstochowa | — | Borys Miturski (4th), Adam Kajoch (9th), Grzegorz Zengota (10th), Maciej Piaszczyński (16th) |
| 2008 | (Germany) Stralsund | 1st 2nd | Artur Mroczka (1st), Maciej Janowski (2nd), Dawid Lampart (11th), Marcel Kajzer (13th), Borys Miturski (14th) |
| 2009 | (Poland) Tarnów | 1st 2nd | Przemysław Pawlicki (1st), Maciej Janowski (2nd), Patryk Dudek (5th), Sławomir Musielak (6th), Dawid Lampart (9th), Kacper Gomólski (—) |
| 2010 | (Croatia) Goričan | 2nd 3rd | Przemysław Pawlicki (2nd), Patryk Dudek (3rd), Emil Pulczyński (5th), Tobiasz Musielak (8th), Łukasz Cyran (9th), Kacper Gomólski (13th), Mateusz Łukaszewski (15th) |

== Riders ==
Riders who started in the Individual Speedway Junior European Championship Finals:

- Rafał Okoniewski (1998 - 1st, 1999 - 1st)
- Karol Ząbik (2004 - 2nd, 2005 - 1st)
- Przemysław Pawlicki (2009 - 1st, 2010 - 2nd)
- Łukasz Romanek (2001 - 1st, 2002 - 16th)
- Artur Mroczka (2008 - 1st)
- Maciej Janowski (2008 - 2nd, 2009 - 2nd)
- Karol Malecha (1999 - 2nd)
- Rafał Kurmański (2001 - 2nd)
- Janusz Kołodziej (2003 - 2nd)
- Jarosław Hampel (1999 - 3rd)
- Patryk Dudek (2009 - 5th, 2010 - 3rd)
- Zbigniew Czerwiński (2000 - 3rd, 2001 - 6th)
- Paweł Hlib (2003 - 11th, 2004 - 7th, 2005 - 4th)
- Tomasz Chrzanowski (1998 - 12th, 1999 - 4th)
- Borys Miturski (2007 - 4th, 2008 - 14th)
- Krzysztof Cegielski (1998 - 4th)
- Marek Cieślewicz (2002 - 4th)
- Adrian Gomólski (2006 - 4th)
- Krzysztof Kasprzak (2001 - 10th, 2002 - 5th)
- Marcin Rempała (2003 - 5th)
- Emil Pulczyński (2010 - 5th)
- Krzysztof Buczkowski (2003 - 12th, 2004 - 9th, 2005 - 6th)
- Mirosław Jabłoński (2003 - 6th, 2004 - 14th)
- Sławomir Musielak (2009 - 6th)
- Mariusz Węgrzyk (1998 - 7th)
- Marcin Jędrzejewski (2005 - 18th, 2006 - 8th)
- Krzysztof Mikuta (1999 - 8th)
- Robert Miśkowiak (2002 - 8th)
- Tobiasz Musielak (2010 - 8th)
- Dawid Lampart (2008 - 11th, 2009 - 9th)
- Andrzej Zieja (1999 - 9th)
- Łukasz Pawlikowski (2000 - 9th)
- Adam Kajoch (2007 - 9th)
- Łukasz Cyran (2010 - 9th)
- Sebastian Smoter (1998 - 10th, 2000 - 10th)
- Grzegorz Zengota (2007 - 10th)
- Paweł Duszyński (1998 - 11th)
- Mateusz Szczepaniak (2006 - 11th)
- Łukasz Stanisławski (2000 - 17th, 2001 - 12th)
- Piotr Świderski (2002 - 12th)
- Tomasz Kwiatkowski (2000 - 12th)
- Adrian Miedziński (2003 - 15th, 2004 - 13th)
- Kacper Gomólski (2009 - reserve, 2010 - 13th)
- Marcel Kajzer (2008 - 13th)
- Patryk Pawłaszczyk (2005 - 13th)
- Sławomir Dąbrowski (2006 - 14th)
- Mateusz Łukaszewski (2010 - 15th)
- Maciej Piaszczyński (2007 - 16th)
- Michał Aszenberg (2000 - 18th)
- Sebastian Brucheiser (2006 - reserve)

== See also ==
- Speedway in Poland
- Poland national speedway team
- Poland national under-21 speedway team
