= 2009 Individual Speedway Junior Polish Championship =

Seasons
- ← 2008 2010 →

The 2008 Individual Speedway Junior Polish Championship (Polish: Młodzieżowe Indywidualne Mistrzostwa Polski, MIMP) is the 2009 version of Individual Speedway Junior Polish Championship organized by the Polish Motor Union (PZM). The Final took place on 7 August 2009 at Alfred Smoczyk Stadium in Leszno. The Championships was won by Patryk Dudek who beat Sławomir Musielak and Dawid Lampart. The defending Champion, Maciej Janowski, finished eighth.

== Qualifying rounds ==
=== Rybnik ===
- Qualifying Round 1
- 15 July 2009 (17:30 UTC+2)
- Rybnik
- Referee: Marek Smyła
- Best time: 62.37 – Grzegorz Zengota (Heat 15) – New Track Record
- Widzów: 500
- Qualify to the Final: 6
- Changes:

No. 4 Tadeusz Kostro (TAR) → No. 17 Konsek
No. 15. Maciej Michaluk (LUB) → No. 18 Chochliński

Pos.	Rider	Points	Details
1	(5) Grzegorz Zengota (ZIE)	14	(3,3,3,3,2)
2	(7) Patryk Dudek (ZIE)	14	(2,3,3,3,3)
3	(11) Dawid Lampart (RZE)	11	(3,2,0,3,3)
4	(1) Sławomir Pyszny (RYB)	11	(3,1,3,2,2)
5	(3) Michał Mitko (RYB)	11	(2,1,3,2,3)
6	(13) Mateusz Kowalczyk (KRO)	11	(3,2,2,2,2)
7	(10) Borys Miturski (CZE)	10	(2,3,1,1,3)
8	(9) Mateusz Szostek (RZE)	7	(1,0,1,3,2)
9	(14) Rafał Klimek (LUB)	7	(2,2,2,0,1)
10	(8) Mateusz Łukowiak (ZIE)	6	(1,3,F,1,1)
11	(16) Piotr Machnik (KRO)	4	(1,X,2,0,1)
12	(19) Paweł Chudy (OPO)	4	(1,2,T,1)
13	(4) Mariusz Konsek (ŁÓD)	3	(1,2,0,T,0)
14	(12) Michał Łopaczewski (PIŁ)	3	(F,X,2,1,E)
15	(2) Jakub Jamróg (TAR)	2	(0,1,1,0,0)
16	(15) Mateusz Chochliński (RYB)	0	(X,0,0,-,-)
17	(6) Marek Czerwiński (OPO)	0	(0,0,-,-,-)

=== Gniezno ===
- Qualifying Round 3
- 15 July 2009 (18:00 UTC+2)
- Gniezno
- Referee: Piotr Nowak (Toruń)
- Best time: 65.97 – Maciej Janowski (Heat 14)
- Widzów: ok. 600
- Qualify to the Final: 5 + 1 reserve
- Change:

No. 9 Mateusz Mikorski (GOR) → No. 17 Szymko
No. 11 Adrian Szewczykowski (GOR) → No. 18 Musielak
No. 12 Paweł Zmarzlik (GOR) → Wawrzyniak
No. 16 Łukasz Cyran (GOR) → Fajer
No. 19 Edward Mazur (TAR) → None

Pos.	Rider	Points	Details
1	(10) Sławomir Musielak (LES)	14	(3,3,3,3,2)
2	(1) Kacper Gomólski (GNI)	12	(3,3,e,3,3)
3	(13) Maciej Janowski (WRO)	11	(3,Fx,2,3,3)
4	(14) Szymon Woźniak (BYD)	10	(2,2,2,2,2)
5	(6) Damian Celmer (TOR)	9+3	(3,X,3,3,X)
6	(15) Mikołaj Curyło (BYD)	9+2	(1,2,3,2,1)
7	(8) Mateusz Lampkowski (TOR)	8	(2,3,3,0,Fx)
8	(4) Cyprian Szymko (GDA)	8	(2,2,0,1,3)
9	(2) Damian Sperz (GDA)	8	(1,1,2,1,3)
10	(3) Marcel Kajzer (GNI)	8	(0,3,1,2,2)
11	(11) Tobiasz Musielak (LES)	6	(2,1,Fx,2,1)
12	(5) Piotr Szóstak (OST)	5	(1,2,1,1,0)
13	(7) Patryk Kociemba (OST)	4	(T,Fx,1,1,2)
14	(9) Marcel Szymko (GDA, PIŁ)	3	(1,1,0,0,1)
15	(12) Marcin Wawrzyniak (GNI)	2	(F4,1,0,0,1)
16	(16) Maciej Fajfer (GNI)	2	(Fx,e4,2,0,0)

=== Ostrów Wlkp. ===
- Qualifying Round 2
- 15 July 2009 (17:00 UTC+2)
- Ostrów Wielkopolski
- Referee: Grzegorz Sokołowski (Ostrów Wlkp.)
- Beat time: 65.30 – Przemysław Pawlicki (Heat 1)
- Widzów: 200
- Qualify to the Final: 5 + 1 reserve

Pos.	Rider	Points	Details
1	(2) Przemysław Pawlicki (LES)	15	(3,3,3,3,3)
2	(5) Rafał Fleger (RYB)	14	(3,3,2,3,3)
3	(10) Emil Pulczyński (TOR)	11	(3,1,3,2,2)
4	(7) Artur Mroczka (GRU)	11	(2,3,1,3,2)
5	(14) Adam Kajoch (POZ)	10	(2,2,3,2,1)
6	(16) Grzegorz Stróżyk (POZ)	8+3	(1,2,3,1,1)
7	(6) Szymon Kiełbasa (TAR)	8+2	(1,0,2,3,2)
8	(4) Patryk Pawlaszczyk (OST)	6	(1,3,2,0,0)
9	(8) Kamil Fleger (RYB)	6	(0,0,2,1,3)
10	(15) Maciej Piaszczyński (ŁÓD)	6	(3,0,E,2,1)
11	(12) Kamil Pulczyński (TOR)	6	(0,1,1,1,3)
12	(11) Marcin Piekarski (CZE)	6	(2,2,0,0,2)
13	(1) Łukasz Sówka (OST)	5	(2,2,1,0,0)
14	(13) Damian Adamczak (BYD)	4	(0,1,0,2,1)
15	(9) Kamil Cieślar (CZE)	3	(1,0,1,1,0)
16	(3) Emil Idziorek (OST)	1	(0,1,E,-,-)
17	(19) Mateusz Łukaszewski (LES)	0	(0,0)

No. 17 Karol Sroka (OST) and No. 18 Adrian Osmólski (CZE) did not started.

== Final ==
- The Final
- 7 August 2009
- Leszno, Alfred Smoczyk Stadium
- Referee: Leszek Demski

#	Riders	Club	2008 place
11	Maciej Janowski	Wrocław	1
10	Grzegorz Zengota	Zielona Góra	3
5	Przemysław Pawlicki	Leszno	4
9	Artur Mroczka	Grudziądz	8
4	Michał Mitko	Rybnik	11
3	Dawid Lampart	Rzeszów	13
7	Adam Kajoch	Poznań	18
2	Rafał Fleger	Rybnik	SF
6	Damian Celmer	Toruń	SF
13	Sławomir Musielak	Leszno	SF
1	Sławomir Pyszny	Rybnik	SF
15	Kacper Gomólski	Gniezno	SF
16	Patryk Dudek	Zielona Góra	—
12	Mateusz Kowalczyk	Krosno	—
14	Emil Pulczyński	Toruń	—
8	Szymon Woźniak	Bydgoszcz	—
17	Mikołaj Curyło	Bydgoszcz	—
18	Grzegorz Stróżyk	Poznań	—

=== Heat details ===
Placing	Rider	Total	1	2	3	4	5	6	7	8	9	10	11	12	13	14	15	16	17	18	19	20	Pts	Pos	21
1	(16) Patryk Dudek (ZIE)	13				2				3	3						2			3			13	2	3
2	(13) Sławomir Musielak (LES)	13				3	2							2		3					3		13	1	2
3	(3) Dawid Lampart (RZE)	12	3						2				2				3				2		12	3	
4	(10) Grzegorz Zengota (ZIE)	11			1			3						3			1		3				11	4	
5	(5) Przemysław Pawlicki (LES)	9		3			0					3					0					3	9	5	
6	(1) Sławomir Pyszny (RYB)	9	0				3				2				3				1				9	6	
7	(9) Artur Mroczka (GRU)	9			2		1						3					2		1			9	7	
8	(11) Maciej Janowski (WRO)	8			3				3		R2					0						2	8	8	
9	(2) Rafał Fleger (RYB)	8	2					1				2				1				2			8	9	
10	(8) Szymon Woźniak (BYD)	7		0						2			1			2			2				7	10	
11	(4) Michał Mitko (RYB)	6	1							1				0				3				1	6	11	
12	(7) Adam Kajoch (POZ)	5		2					0					1	2					0			5	12	
13	(6) Damian Celmer (TOR)	5		1				2			1							0			1		5	13	
14	(15) Kacper Gomólski (GNI)	4				1			1			1						1	0				4	14	
15	(12) Mateusz Kowalczyk (KRO)	1			0					0		0			1						0		1	15	
16	(14) Emil Pulczyński (TOR)	0				0		0					0		0							0	0	16	
	(17) Mikołaj Curyło (BYD)	0																					0		
	(18) Grzegorz Stróżyk (POZ)	0																					0		
Placing	Rider	Total	1	2	3	4	5	6	7	8	9	10	11	12	13	14	15	16	17	18	19	20	Pts	Pos	21

m - exclusion for exceeding two minute time allowance • t - exclusion for touching the tapes • x - other exclusion • e - retired or mechanical failure • f - fell • ns - non-starter • nc - non-classify

gate A - inside	gate B	gate C	gate D - outside

== See also ==
- 2009 Team Speedway Junior Polish Championship
- 2009 Individual Speedway Polish Championship
