= 2008 Danish speedway season =

Season of speedway in Denmark

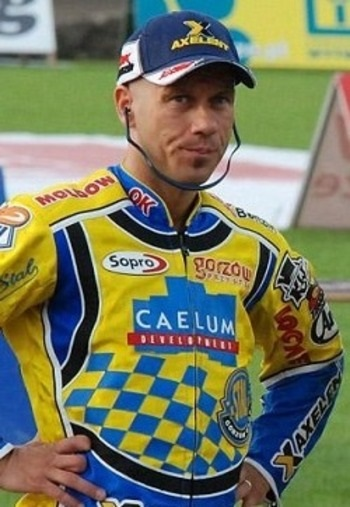
- Nicki Pedersen, champion of Denmark for the fifth time.

== Individual ==
=== Individual Championship ===
The 2008 Danish Individual Speedway Championship was the 2008 edition of the Danish Individual Speedway Championship. The final was staged over two rounds, at Holsted and Outrup, and was won by Nicki Pedersen. It was Pedersen's fifth national title, taking him level with Erik Gundersen in third place on the all-time list.

Semi-final

Semi-final

- 2 May 2008, held at Grindsted

| Pos. | Rider | Points | Details |
|---|---|---|---|
| 1 | Charlie Gjedde | 14 | (2,3,3,3,3) |
| 2 | Leon Madsen | 11 | (0,2,3,3,3) |
| 3 | Ulrich Østergaard | 11 | (3,1,2,2,3) |
| 4 | Peter Juul Larsen | 10 | (1,3,2,2,2) |
| 5 | Henning Bager | 9 | (3,0,2,1,3) |
| 6 | Nicolai Klindt | 9 | (2,0,2,3,2) |
| 7 | Claus Vissing | 9 | (2,3,1,2,1) |
| 8 | Dannie Søderholm | 9 | (2,3,1,2,0) |
| 9 | Klaus Jakobsen | 9 | (0,2,1,3,2) |
| 10 | Henrik Møller | 7 | (3,1,0,1,2) |
| 11 | Morten Risager | 6 | (1,2,1,1,1) |
| 12 | Anders Andersen | 5 | (3,1,0,0,1) |
| 13 | Jan Graversen | 5 | (1,1,3,0,0) |
| 14 | Patrick Nørgaard | 4 | (0,0,3,0,1) |
| 15 | Jesper Kristiansen | 3 | (0,2,0,1,0) |
| 16 | Kenneth Hansen | 1 | (1,0,0,0) |

Final series

Round one

- 17 May 2008, held at Holsted

| Pos. | Rider | Points | Details |
|---|---|---|---|
| 1 | Nicki Pedersen | 14 | (2,3,3,3,3) |
| 2 | Hans N. Andersen | 14 | (3,3,2,3,3) |
| 3 | Niels Kristian Iversen | 12 | (3,1,3,3,2) |
| 4 | Mads Korneliussen | 11 | (3,2,3,0,3) |
| 5 | Kenneth Bjerre | 11 | (2,2,3,2,2) |
| 6 | Jesper B. Monberg | 9 | (1,0,2,3,3) |
| 7 | Nicolai Klindt | 9 | (3,1,2,2,1) |
| 8 | Charlie Gjedde | 9 | (2,2,2,1,2) |
| 9 | Patrick Hougaard | 8 | (2,3,0,2,1) |
| 10 | Henning Bager | 7 | (1,3,1,1,1) |
| 11 | Leon Madsen | 5 | (1,1,1,1,1) |
| 12 | Claus Vissing | 4 | (0,0,0,2,2) |
| 13 | Ulrich Østergaard | 3 | (0,2,1,0,0) |
| 14 | Dannie Søderholm | 3 | (1,1,1,0,0) |
| 15 | Klaus Jakobsen | 1 | (0,0,0,0,1) |
| 16 | Peter Juul Larsen | 0 | (0,0,0,0,0) |
| 17 | Henrik Møller | 0 | (0) |

Round two

- 8 August 2008, held at Outrup

| Pos. | Rider | Points | Details |
|---|---|---|---|
| 1 | Nicki Pedersen | 17 | (3,3,3,3,2,3) |
| 2 | Niels Kristian Iversen | 14 | (3,1,2,3,3,2) |
| 3 | Hans N. Andersen | 14 | (3,3,3,3,1,1) |
| 4 | Kenneth Bjerre | 11 | (1,3,3,2,2,0) |
| 5 | Mads Korneliussen | 11 | (2,2,1,3,3) |
| 6 | Patrick Hougaard | 9 | (1,3,0,2,3) |
| 7 | Nicolai Klindt | 9 | (3,1,2,2,1) |
| 8 | Jesper B. Monberg | 8 | (2,2,0,1,3) |
| 9 | Claus Vissing | 8 | (2,2,1,2,1) |
| 10 | Charlie Gjedde | 6 | (0,2,2,0,2) |
| 11 | Ulrich Østergaard | 6 | (0,1,2,1,2) |
| 12 | Henning Bager | 5 | (0,1,3,0,1) |
| 13 | Klaus Jakobsen | 2 | (2,0,0,0,0) |
| 14 | Leon Madsen | 2 | (0,0,1,1,0) |
| 15 | Dannie Søderholm | 2 | (1,0,0,1,0,) |
| 16 | Peter Juul Larsen | 2 | (1,0,1,0,0) |
| 17 | Henrik Møller | 0 | (0,0,0) |

Final classification

| Pos. | Rider | Points | | |
|---|---|---|---|---|
| 1 | Nicki Pedersen (Holsted) | 31 | 14 | 17 |
| 2 | Hans N. Andersen (Fjelsted) | 28 | 14 | 14 |
| 3 | Niels Kristian Iversen (Holsted) | 26 | 12 | 14 |
| 4 | Kenneth Bjerre (Esbjerg) | 22 | 11 | 11 |
| 5 | Mads Korneliussen (Esbjerg) | 22 | 11 | 11 |
| 6 | Nicolai Klindt (Outrup) | 18 | 9 | 9 |
| 7 | Patrick Hougaard (Holsted) | 17 | 8 | 9 |
| - | Jesper B. Monberg (Slangerup) | 17 | 9 | 8 |
| 9 | Charlie Gjedde (Outrup) | 15 | 9 | 6 |
| 10 | Henning Bager (Grindsted) | 12 | 7 | 5 |
| 11 | Claus Vissing (Fjelsted) | 12 | 4 | 8 |
| 12 | Ulrich Østergaard (Brovst) | 9 | 3 | 6 |
| 13 | Leon Madsen (Holstebro) | 7 | 5 | 2 |
| 14 | Dannie Søderholm (Slangerup) | 5 | 3 | 2 |
| 15 | Klaus Jakobsen (Esbjerg) | 3 | 1 | 2 |
| 16 | Peter Juul Larsen (Grindsted) | 2 | 0 | 2 |
| 17 | Henrik Møller (Holstebro) | 0 | 0 | 0 |

=== U21 Championship ===
Nicolai Klindt won the U21 Championship at Fjelsted on 17 August.

| Pos. | Rider | Points |
|---|---|---|
| 1 | Nicolai Klindt | 15+3 |
| 2 | Patrick Hougaard | 12+2 |
| 3 | René Bach | 11+1 |
| 4 | Peter Kildemand | 11+0 |
| 5 | Morten Risager | 10 |
| 6 | Leon Madsen | 9 |
| 7 | Krister Jacobsen | 8 |
| 8 | Kenneth Kruse Hansen | 8 |
| 9 | Kenni Arendt Larsen | 7 |
| 10 | Jan Graversen | 6 |
| 11 | Dannie Soderholm | 5 |
| 12 | Peter Juul Larsen | 4 |
| 13 | Steffen B. Jespersen | 3 |
| 14 | Patrick Nørgaard | 3 |
| 15 | Klaus Jakobsen | 3 |
| 16 | Simon Nielsen (res) | 3 |
| 17 | Anders Andersen | 2 |

== Team ==
=== Danish Speedway League ===
The 2008 season was won by Slangerup; they beat Esbjerg and Holsted.

| Pos | Team | P | W | D | L | Pts | BP | Total |
|---|---|---|---|---|---|---|---|---|
| 1 | Slangerup | 14 | 11 | 0 | 3 | 36 | 7 | 43 |
| 2 | Esbjerg Vikings | 14 | 8 | 1 | 5 | 31 | 5 | 36 |
| 3 | Holsted Tigers | 14 | 8 | 1 | 5 | 31 | 4 | 35 |
| 4 | Fjelsted | 14 | 5 | 0 | 9 | 24 | 5 | 29 |
| 5 | Grindsted | 14 | 6 | 0 | 8 | 26 | 3 | 29 |
| 6 | Brovst | 14 | 6 | 0 | 8 | 26 | 1 | 27 |
| 7 | Holstebro | 14 | 6 | 0 | 8 | 26 | 1 | 27 |
| 8 | Outrup | 14 | 5 | 0 | 9 | 24 | 2 | 26 |

== Teams ==
Slangerup

- Jesper B. Monberg
- Peter Ljung
- Grzegorz Walasek
- Kenneth Kruse Hansen
- Morten Risager
- Ricky Kling
- Jernej Kolenko
- Dannie Søderholm
- Carsten Hansen
- Matej Kus
- Mariusz Franków
- Dennis S. Thostesen
- Jesper Søgaard-Kristiansen
- Mikkel Michelsen
- Nicki Barrett
- Lars Munkedal

Esbjerg

- Kenneth Bjerre
- Adam Skornicki
- Norbert Kosciuch
- Tobias Busch
- Mads Korneliussen
- Brian Lyngsø
- Krister Jacobsen
- Bjarne Nilsson
- Johannes Kikkenborg
- Karsten Højhus
- Michael Palm Toft

Holsted

- Nicki Pedersen
- Niels Kristian Iversen
- Damian Baliński
- Martin Vaculik
- Patrick Hougaard
- Simon Nielsen
- Morten G. Hansen
- Slawomir Musielak

Fjelsted

- Hans Andersen
- Sebastian Ułamek
- Claus Vissing
- Klaus Jakobsen
- Manuel Hauzinger
- Maciej Piaszczyński
- Casper Wortmann
- Peter Kildemand
- Rene Bach
- Adam Kajoch
- Thomas Irming

Grindsted

- Rune Holta
- Kaj Laukkanen
- Kyle Legault
- Freddie Eriksson
- Henning Bager
- Jesper Kristiansen
- Peter Juul Larsen
- Henrik Gustafsson
- Anders Andersen
- Sönke Petersen
- Kalle Greve
- Paw Mikkelsen

Brovst

- Ulrich Ostergaard
- Robert Mikołajczak
- Klaus Jakobsen
- Patrick Nørgaard
- Mads Georgsen
- Jeppe Schmidt
- Jacek Rempała
- Jorgen Krogh

Holstebro

- Bjarne Pedersen
- Henrik Moller
- Leon Madsen
- Kenni Arendt Larsen
- Michael Vissing
- David Ruud
- Claes Nedermark
- Mathias Schultz

Outrup

- Charlie Gjedde
- Nicolai Klindt
- Marcin Sekula
- Damian Sperz
- Steffen S. Andersen
- Erik Pudel
- Krzysztof Buczkowski
- Piotr Protasiewicz
- Greg Hancock
- Ronnie Jamroży
