= 2008 Bronze Helmet (Poland) =

The 2008 Bronze Helmet (Polish: Turniej o Brązowy Kask, BK) is the 2008 version of Bronze Helmet organized by the Polish Motor Union (PZM). It is unofficial Individual U-19 Polish Championship.

The Final took place on September 26, 2008, in Gdańsk.

== Calendar ==
Date	Venue	Winner	Runner-up	3rd place	
Semi-Finals
9 September	Gniezno	Rafał Fleger (OPO)	Sławomir Musielak (GNI)	Artur Mroczka (GRU)	result
9 September	Ostrów Wlkp.	Borys Miturski (CZE)	Dawid Lampart (RZE)	Damian Celmer (TOR)	result
Final
26 September	Gdańsk				result

== Semi-finals ==
=== Gniezno ===
- Semi-Final 1
- 2008-09-09 (16:30 pm)
- (Poland) Gniezno
- Referee: Leszek Demski (Ostrów Wielkopolski)
- Qualify: 8 + 1R
- Attendance: 700
- Beat Time: 64.38 - Sławomir Musielak in Heat 1
- (18) Mateusz Chochliński (RYB), (19) Paweł Paliga (RYB) and (20) Paweł Ratajszczak (LES) did not started

Pos.	Rider	Points	Details
1	(13) Rafał Fleger (OPO)	12	(3,3,2,2,2)
2	(1) Sławomir Musielak (GNI)	12	(3,2,2,3,2)
3	(3) Artur Mroczka (GRU)	11	(1,3,3,3,1)
4	(12) Marcin Piekarski (CZE)	10	(3,2,0,2,3)
5	(11) Sławomir Pyszny (RYB)	10	(2,2,0,3,3)
6	(10) Patryk Dudek (ZIE)	10	(1,1,3,2,3)
7	(2) Adrian Szewczykowski (GOR)	10	(2,2,2,1,3)
8	(5) Damian Sperz (GDA)	9	(2,1,3,1,2)
9	(6) Przemysław Pawlicki (LES)	9	(3,3,3,T,Fx)
10	(4) Łukasz Cyran (GOR)	7	(E4,3,E3,3,1)
11	(15) Szymon Kiełbasa (TAR)	5	(1,0,1,2,1)
12	(9) Mateusz Kowalczyk (CZE)	4	(0,0,2,1,1)
13	(14) Marcel Kajzer (RAW)	4	(2,0,1,1,0)
14	(16) Tadeusz Kostro (TAR)	4	(0,1,1,T/-,2)
15	(7) Adam Wiśniewski (TOR)	3	(1,1,1,0,0)
16	(17) Kamil Cieślar (CZE)	0	(0,E4,0,X)
17	(8) Maciej Fajfer (GNI)	0	(Fx,-,-,-,N)

Heat Times:
Heat 1-6: 64.38 65.96 67.98 67.26 67.22 65.36
Heat 7-12: 65.58 66.18 66.74 67.06 65.82 67.37
Heat 13-18: 66.81 67.29 66.97 67.37 67.47 66.43
Heat 19-20: 67.84 67.98

=== Ostrów Wlkp. ===
- Semi-Final 2
- 2008-09-09 (17:00 pm)
- (Poland) Ostrów Wielkopolski
- Referee: Ryszard Bryła (Zielona Góra)
- Qualify: 8 + 1R
- Attendance: 200
- Beat Time: 65.35 secs - Maciej Janowski in Heat 3
- Changes:
  - (10) Janusz Baniak (ZIE) → (17) Lampkowski
  - (11) Paweł Gwóźdź (ZIE) → (18) Sroka

Pos.	Rider	Points	Details
1	(4) Borys Miturski (CZE)	13	(3,2,3,2,3)
2	(8) Dawid Lampart (RZE)	12	(3,T/-,3,3,3)
3	(16) Damian Celmer (TOR)	12	(2,3,2,3,2)
4	(12) Maciej Janowski (WRO)	10	(3,1,3,M/-,3)
5	(9) Kacper Gomólski (GNI)	10	(1,1,2,3,3)
6	(6) Michał Łopaczewski (BYD)	8	(2,0,3,1,2)
7	(7) Mateusz Szostek (RZE)	8	(1,2,2,3,0)
8	(3) Maciej Piaszczyński (OST)	7+3	(1,3,1,1,1)
9	(10) Mateusz Lampkowski (TOR)	7+2	(2,1,1,2,1)
10	(13) Oskar Pieniążek (TOR)	7+1	(3,3,0,1,0)
11	(2) Mateusz Mikorski (GOR)	6	(0,3,X/-,2,1)
12	(1) Emil Idziorek (OST)	6	(2,2,0,Fx,2)
13	(15) Marcel Szymko (GDA)	6	(1,2,0,2,1)
14	(18) Piotr Szóstak (OST)	3	(2,1)
15	(5) Piotr Machnik (KRO)	2	(0,0,X/-,0,2)
16	(11) Karol Sroka (OST)	2	(0,1,1,0,E3)
17	(17) Paweł Zmarzlik (GOR)	1	(0,1)
18	(14) Cyprian Szymko (GDA)	0	(0,0,0,0,0)

- Heat 8: Lampart (T) → Zmarzlik
- Heat 10: Mikorski (X) and Machnik (X) → Szóstak and Zmarzlik
- Heat 13: Janowski (M) → Szóstak

Gate in Heat 21: (A) Piaszczyński, (B) Pieniążek, (C) Lampkowski

Heat Times:
Heat 1-6: 66,06 66,50 65,35 67,25 67,88 67,94
Heat 7-12: 66,28 66,38 67,82 66,59 67,19 67,25
Heat 13-18: 67,16 67,50 67,22 68,09 68,69 67,94
Heat 19-21: 67,68 67,88 68,22

== Final ==
- Final
- 2008-09-26 (18:00)
- (Poland) Gdańsk
- Referee: Józef Piekarski (Toruń)
- Attendance:
- Beat Time:
- Change:
  - (17) Przemysław Pawlicki (LES) → Szymon Kiełbasa (TAR) → Mateusz Kowalczyk (CZE)

Placing	Rider	Total	1	2	3	4	5	6	7	8	9	10	11	12	13	14	15	16	17	18	19	20	Pts	Pos	21
1	(3) Artur Mroczka (GRU)	13	3						3				3				1				3		13	1	
2	(2) Maciej Janowski (WRO)	12	2					2				3				2				3			12	2	
3	(7) Adrian Szewczykowski (GOR)	11		2					1					3	3					2			11	3	3
4	(16) Damian Sperz (GDA)	11				2				2	3						3			1			11	4	F2
5	(14) Rafał Fleger (OPO)	10				3		1					1		2							3	10	5	
6	(10) Patryk Dudek (ZIE)	9			Fx			3						2			2		2				9	6	
7	(8) Michał Łopaczewski (BYD)	8		0						0			2			3			3				8	7	
8	(6) Kacper Gomólski (GNI)	7		1				0			2							3			1		7	8	
9	(9) Dawid Lampart (RZE)	6			3		3						0					Fx		F3			6	9	
10	(12) Sławomir Musielak (GNI)	6			1					1		1			1						2		6	10	
11	(4) Sławomir Pyszny (RYB)	5	F4							3				F1x				2				Fx	5	11	
11	(5) Borys Miturski (CZE)	5		3			F					2					E4					Fx	5	11	
13	(1) Marcin Piekarski (CZE)	5	1				2				1				E4				1				5	13	
14	(11) Damian Celmer (TOR)	4			2				2		F1					-						-	4	14	
15	(15) Mateusz Szostek (RZE)	3				1			1			0						1	Fx				3	15	
16	(13) Maciej Piaszczyński (OST)	3				E4	1							1		1					M/-		3	16	
17	(17) Mateusz Kowalczyk (CZE)	0														E4							0	17	
18	(18) Mateusz Lampkowski (TOR)	0																			F	Fx	0	18	
Placing	Rider	Total	1	2	3	4	5	6	7	8	9	10	11	12	13	14	15	16	17	18	19	20	Pts	Pos	21

m - exclusion for exceeding two minute time allowance • t - exclusion for touching the tapes • x - other exclusion • e - retired or mechanical failure • f - fell • ns - non-starter • nc - non-classify

gate A - inside	gate B	gate C	gate D - outside

== See also ==
- 2008 Individual Speedway Junior European Championship
- 2008 Individual Speedway Junior Polish Championship
