= 2009 Individual Speedway Polish Championship =

The 2009 Individual Speedway Polish Championship (Polish: Indywidualne Mistrzostwa Polski, IMP) was the 2009 version of Individual Speedway Polish Championship organized by the Polish Motor Union (PZM). The defending Champion was Adam Skórnicki, who finished sixth. The final took place on 25 July 2009 at MotoArena Toruń in Toruń, and was won by Tomasz Gollob, who beat Krzysztof Kasprzak and Janusz Kołodziej and obtained his eight title.

== Quarter-finals ==
=== Gniezno ===
- Quarter-Final 1
- 18 June 2009 (18:00)
- Gniezno
- Referee: Leszek Demski (Ostrów Wlkp.)
- Beat time: 63.50 - Krzysztof Jabłoński (heat 1)
- Qualify to Rawicz: 5 + Tomasz Gollob, Damian Baliński and Krzysztof Kasprzak

Pos.	Rider	Points	Details
1	(16) Rafał Dobrucki (ZIE)	14	(2,3,3,3,3)
2	(3) Krzysztof Jabłoński (GNI)	14	(3,3,3,2,3)
3	(5) Sławomir Musielak (LES)	12	(3,3,3,0,3)
4	(1) Dawid Cieślewicz (GNI)	10	(2,1,1,3,3)
5	(10) Krzysztof Buczkowski (BYD)	10	(3,3,2,1,1)
6	(8) Norbert Kościuch (POZ)	9	(2,2,1,2,2)
7	(13) Grzegorz Zengota (ZIE)	8+3	(0,2,3,1,2)
8	(4) Kamil Brzozowski (GRU)	8+2	(1,1,1,3,2)
9	(2) Artur Mroczka (GRU)	8+E	(0,2,1,3,2)
10	(6) Zbigniew Suchecki (POZ)	7	(1,1,2,2,1)
11	(15) Marcin Rempała (RYB)	5	(T/-,2,2,1,0)
12	(9) Marcin Nowaczyk (RAW)	4	(1,E,2,E,1)
13	(14) Bartosz Kasprowiak (KRO)	3	(3,0,0,0,0)
14	(7) Jacek Rempała (LUB)	3	(0,1,0,2,0)
15	(11) Piotr Dziatkowiak (RAW)	3	(2,0,0,0,1)
16	(12) Robert Mikołajczak (RAW)	1	(0,0,0,1,0)
17	(17) Marcin Jędrzejewski (BYD)	1	(1)
-	(18) Robert Flis (OPO)	-	-

=== Krosno ===
- Quarter-Final 3
- 18 June 2009 (17:00)
- Krosno
- Referee: Marek Wojaczek
- Beat time: 70.2 - Janusz Kołodziej (heat 1)
- Qualify to Opole: 5 + Grzegorz Walasek, Jarosław Hampel and Adam Skórnicki
- Change:
  - (13) Tomasz Schmidt (OPO) → track reserve Cieślar (CZE)

Pos.	Rider	Points	Details
1	(10) Rafał Trojanowski (POZ)	14	(3,2,3,3,3)
2	(2) Janusz Kołodziej (TAR)	13	(3,3,2,3,2)
3	(12) Dawid Lampart (RZE)	12	(2,3,3,1,3)
4	(7) Michał Szczepaniak (CZE)	11	(2,3,2,3,1)
5	(9) Dawid Stachyra (RZE)	10	(1,2,1,3,3)
6	(11) Paweł Miesiąc (RZE)	9+3	(T,1,3,2,3)
7	(3) Roman Chromik (KRO)	9+2	(2,0,3,2,2)
8	(5) Rafał Okoniewski (GOR)	7	(1,3,1,1,1)
9	(14) Grzegorz Knapp (GRU)	7	(2,1,2,2,0)
10	(13) Kamil Cieślar (CZE)	6	(3,1,F,1,1)
11	(17) Tomasz Łukaszewicz (KRO)	5	(3,0,1,1,E)
12	(15) Karol Baran (LUB)	5	(0,2,E,2,1)
13	(4) Szymon Kiełbasa (TAR)	5	(1,1,1,0,2)
14	(1) Mateusz Kowalczyk (KRO)	4	(0,0,2,0,2)
15	(16) Tomasz Rempała (LUB)	3	(1,2,E,0,0)
16	(8) Sławomir Drabik (CZE)	0	(X,E,N,N,N)
17	(6) Tomasz Gapiński (CZE)	0	(F/-,-,-,-,-)

=== Piła ===
- Quarter-Final 2
- 18 June 2009 (17:00)
- Piła
- Referee: Ryszard Bryła
- Qualify to Rawicz: 6 + Piotr Protasiewicz and Rune Holta
- Change:
  - (11) Mariusz Franków (ŁÓD) → track reserve Staszek (GRU)
  - (18) Linette to QR-Łódź

Pos.	Rider	Points	Details
1	(10) Adrian Miedziński (TOR)	14	(3,3,3,3,2)
2	(6) Daniel Jeleniewski (WRO)	13	(3,2,3,3,2)
3	(8) Piotr Świderski (TAR)	13	(2,3,3,2,3)
4	(1) Piotr Świst (PIŁ)	10	(3,3,1,2,1)
5	(15) Tomasz Chrzanowski (BYD)	9+3	(3,3,1,2,0)
6	(3) Mateusz Szczepaniak (POZ)	9+2	(1,1,2,2,3)
7	(2) Łukasz Jankowski (POZ)	9+1	(2,0,2,3,2)
8	(5) Robert Miśkowiak (OST)	8+3	(0,1,3,1,3)
9	(7) Przemysław Pawlicki (LES)	8+2	(1,0,1,3,3)
10	(11) Paweł Staszek (GRU)	8+1	(2,2,2,1,1)
11	(13) Michał Mitko (RYB)	6	(1,2,2,0,1)
12	(16) Krzysztof Słaboń (GNI)	5	(2,2,0,0,1)
13	(14) Mirosław Jabłoński (GNI)	5	(E,1,1,1,2)
14	(9) Piotr Rembas (OPO)	1	(1,0,0,1,E)
15	(4) Damian Sperz (GDA)	1	(0,1,0,0,E)
16	(12) Maciej Piaszczyński (ŁÓD)	0	(0,E,0,-,-)
17	(18) Michał Łopaczewski (PIŁ)	0	(0)
18	(17) Krzysztof Pecyna (PIŁ)	0	(F)

=== Łódź ===
- Quarter-Final 4
- 18 June 2009 (16:30)
- Łódź
- Referee: Marek Smyła (Wrocław)
- Qualify to Opole: 6 + Sebastian Ułamek and Robert Kościecha
- Best time: 67.19 secs - Maciej Janowski (heat 4)
- Change:
  - (9) Patryk Pawlaszczyk (OST) → track reserve Marcin Piekarski (CZE)
  - two track reserve Marcin Sekula (OPO) and Rafał Fleger (RYB) did not started
  - (16) Rafał Klimek (LUB) → Linette (PIŁ)

Pos.	Rider	Points	Details
1	(13) Maciej Janowski (WRO)	13	(3,3,2,2,3)
2	(11) Wiesław Jaguś (TOR)	12	(3,3,3,3,N)
3	(10) Karol Ząbik (OST)	12	(1,3,3,3,2)
4	(12) Adrian Gomólski (OST)	12	(2,3,2,3,2)
5	(15) Tomasz Jędrzejak (WRO)	11	(2,2,1,3,3)
6	(7) Mariusz Węgrzyk (RYB)	10+3	(3,1,1,2,3)
7	(4) Maciej Kuciapa (RZE)	10+2	(3,2,0,2,3)
8	(2) Piotr Dym (ŁÓD)	8	(0,2,3,1,2)
9	(5) Sławomir Pyszny (RYB)	7	(2,2,X,1,2)
10	(3) Daniel Pytel (POZ)	6	(2,0,2,2,X)
11	(1) Stanisław Burza (ŁÓD)	6	(1,1,2,1,1)
12	(14) Adam Czechowicz (OPO)	5	(1,1,3,E,N)
13	(8) Ronnie Jamroży (RYB)	3	(1,1,1,N,N)
14	(9) Marcin Piekarski (CZE)	2	(E,E,E,1,1)
15	(16) Łukasz Linette (PIŁ)	1	(0,0,1,E,0)
16	(6) Borys Miturski (CZE)	0	(E,N,N,N,N)

== Semi-finals ==
2009 Speedway Grand Prix permanent riders and the top 8 riders from 2008 Individual Polish Championship Final are expected to participate in the semi-finals:

- Tomasz Gollob (GP #3 and 4th place in 2008 Final)
- Rune Holta (#8)
- Grzegorz Walasek (#13 and 3rd)
- Sebastian Ułamek (#14)
- Adam Skórnicki (1st)
- Jarosław Hampel (2nd)
- Damian Baliński (5th)
- Krzysztof Kasprzak (6th)
- Piotr Protasiewicz (7th)
- Robert Kościecha (8th)

=== Rawicz ===
- Semi-Final 1
- 1 July 2009 (18:00 UTC+2)
- Rawicz, Florian Kapała Stadium
- Change: (13) Rune Holta (GOR) → (18) Jankowski
- Qualify to the Final: 8

Pos.	Rider	Points	Details
1	(15) Piotr Protasiewicz (ZIE)	13	(3,3,1,3,3)
2	(14) Krzysztof Kasprzak (LES)	13	(2,3,3,3,2)
3	(11) Adrian Miedziński (TOR)	12	(1,2,3,3,3)
4	(3) Krzysztof Jabłoński (GNI)	11	(3,0,2,3,3)
5	(5) Daniel Jeleniewski (WRO)	11	(3,2,3,2,1)
6	(7) Tomasz Gollob (GOR)	10	(1,1,3,2,3)
7	(8) Damian Baliński (LES)	9	(2,3,1,2,1)
8	(1) Piotr Świderski (TAR)	7	(1,3,1,X,2)
9	(2) Sławomir Musielak (LES)	6+3	(2,2,0,0,2)
10	(13) Łukasz Jankowski (POZ)	6+2	(1,1,2,1,1)
11	(9) Krzysztof Buczkowski (BYD)	5	(2,0,0,2,1)
12	(10) Mateusz Szczepaniak (POZ)	5	(3,1,1,0,0)
13	(12) Tomasz Chrzanowski (BYD)	5	(0,0,2,1,2)
14	(16) Rafał Dobrucki (ZIE)	4	(0,1,2,1,X)
15	(4) Piotr Świst (PIŁ)	2	(0,2,e3,X,e)
16	(6) Dawid Cieślewicz (GNI)	1	(0,e4,0,1,0)
-	(17) Norbert Kościuch (POZ)	-	-

=== Opole ===
- Semi-Final 2
- 1 July 2009 (17:00 UTC+2)
- Opole
- Change: (7) injury Sebastian Ułamek (TAR) → (18) Kuciapa
- Qualify to the Final: 8

Pos.	Rider	Points	Details
1	(15) Adrian Gomólski (OST)	15	(3,3,3,3,3)
2	(2) Grzegorz Walasek (ZIE)	12	(3,3,1,3,2)
3	(12) Janusz Kołodziej (TAR)	12	(2,3,2,2,3)
4	(5) Karol Ząbik (OST)	11	(2,3,0,3,3)
5	(6) Michał Szczepaniak (CZE)	10	(3,2,3,1,1)
6	(9) Wiesław Jaguś (TOR)	10	(3,0,2,2,3)
7	(7) Maciej Kuciapa (RZE)	9	(1,1,3,3,1)
8	(1) Adam Skórnicki (GDA)	8	(2,2,1,1,2)
9	(8) Maciej Janowski (WRO)	7	(F,2,3,2,F)
10	(13) Mariusz Węgrzyk (RYB)	6	(0,1,2,1,2)
11	(11) Rafał Trojanowski (POZ)	4	(1,2,0,0,1)
12	(16) Tomasz Jędrzejak (WRO)	3	(1,0,2,0,0)
13	(17) Paweł Miesiąc (RZE)	3	(1,0,e,2)
14	(3) Jarosław Hampel (LES)	3	(1,e,0,2,-)
15	(10) Dawid Stachyra (RZE)	3	(0,1,0,1,1)
16	(14) Dawid Lampart (RZE)	2	(2,e,-,-,-)
17	(4) Robert Kościecha (TOR)	2	(e,1,1,e,M)

== Final ==
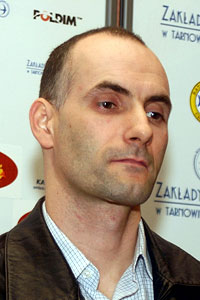
Eighth title for Tomasz Gollob

- The Final
- 25 July 2009 (19:30 UTC+2)
- Toruń, MotoArena Toruń
- Referee: Jerzy Najwer
- Attendance: 12,500
- Beat time: 58,06 - Wiesław Jaguś in Heat 6

=== Riders ===
#	Riders	Club	2008 place
13	Adam Skórnicki	Gdańsk	1
9	Grzegorz Walasek #13	Zielona Góra	3
10	Tomasz Gollob #3	Gorzów Wlkp.	4
7	Damian Baliński	Leszno	5
12	Krzysztof Kasprzak	Leszno	6
14	Piotr Protasiewicz	Zielona Góra	7
11	Janusz Kołodziej	Tarnów	11
5	Adrian Gomólski	Ostrów Wlkp.	14
8	Michał Szczepaniak	Częstochowa	15
1	Krzysztof Jabłoński	Gniezno	17
3	Adrian Miedziński	Toruń	F
16	Piotr Świderski	Tarnów	F
4	Daniel Jeleniewski	Wrocław	SF
15	Maciej Kuciapa	Rzeszów	SF
6	Wiesław Jaguś	Toruń	SF
2	Karol Ząbik	Ostrów Wlkp.	QR
17	Sławomir Musielak	Leszno	QR
18	Maciej Janowski	Wrocław	—

=== Heat details ===
Placing	Rider	Total	1	2	3	4	5	6	7	8	9	10	11	12	13	14	15	16	17	18	19	20	Pts	Pos	21
1	(10) Tomasz Gollob (GOR)	13			3			1						3			3		3				13	1	
2	(12) Krzysztof Kasprzak (LES)	11			1					3		3			3						1		11	2	3
3	(11) Janusz Kołodziej (TAR)	11			2				2		2					3						2	11	3	2
4	(9) Grzegorz Walasek (ZIE)	10			0		1						3					3		3			10	4	
5	(6) Wiesław Jaguś (TOR)	10		0				3			3							2			2		10	5	
6	(13) Adam Skórnicki (GDA)	10				3	3							2		2					0		10	6	
7	(3) Adrian Miedziński (TOR)	10	1						3				1				2				3		10	7	
8	(14) Piotr Protasiewicz (ZIE)	9				2		2					2		0							3	9	8	
9	(1) Krzysztof Jabłoński (GNI)	8	2				2				0				2				2				8	9	
10	(4) Daniel Jeleniewski (WRO)	5	3							2				0				0				E4	5	10	
11	(5) Adrian Gomólski (OST)	5		3			Fx					1					0					1	5	11	
12	(16) Piotr Świderski (TAR)	4				0				E3	1						1			2			4	12	
13	(7) Damian Baliński (LES)	4		2					Fx					1	1					F/-			4	13	
14	(8) Michał Szczepaniak (CZE)	4		1						1			0			1			1				4	14	
15	(15) Maciej Kuciapa (RZE)	3				1			1			0						1	0				3	15	
16	(2) Karol Ząbik (OST)	2	0					0				2				Fx				Fx			2	16	
17	(17) Sławomir Musielak (LES)	1																		1			1	17	
	(18) Maciej Janowski (WRO)	0																					0		
Placing	Rider	Total	1	2	3	4	5	6	7	8	9	10	11	12	13	14	15	16	17	18	19	20	Pts	Pos	21

m - exclusion for exceeding two minute time allowance • t - exclusion for touching the tapes • x - other exclusion • e - retired or mechanical failure • f - fell • ns - non-starter • nc - non-classify

gate A - inside	gate B	gate C	gate D - outside

=== Heat after heat ===
1. (59,06) Jeleniewski, Jabłoński, Miedziński, Ząbik
2. (59,34) Gomólski, Baliński, Szczepaniak, Jaguś
3. (58,59) Gollob, Kołodziej, Kasprzak, Walasek
4. (59,16) Skórnicki, Protasiewicz, Kuciapa, Świderski
5. (59,09) Skórnicki, Jabłoński, Walasek, Gomólski (Fx)
6. (58,06) Jaguś, Protasiewicz, Gollob, Ząbik
7. (59,31) Miedziński, Kołodziej, Kuciapa, Baliński (Fx)
8. (59,28) Kasprzak, Jeleniewski, Szczepaniak, Świderski (e3)
9. (59,10) Jaguś, Kołodziej, Świderski, Jabłoński
10. (59,54) Kasprzak, Ząbik, Gomólski, Kuciapa
11. (59,36) Walasek, Protasiewicz, Miedziński, Szczepaniak
12. (60,09) Gollob, Skórnicki, Baliński, Jeleniewski
13. (59,91) Kasprzak, Jabłoński, Baliński, Protasiewicz
14. (60,72) Kołodziej, Skórnicki, Szczepaniak, Ząbik (Fx)
15. (60,06) Gollob, Miedziński, Świderski, Gomólski
16. (60,59) Walasek, Jaguś, Kuciapa, Jeleniewski
17. (60,37) Gollob, Jabłoński, Szczepaniak, Kuciapa
18. (59,69) Walasek, Świderski, Musielak (Baliński F/-), Ząbik (Fx)
19. (60,63) Miedziński, Jaguś, Kasprzak, Skórnicki
20. (60,31) Protasiewicz, Kołodziej, Gomólski, Jeleniewski (e4)
  Silver-bronze medal Run-Off:
21. (59,32) Kasprzak, Kołodziej

== See also ==
- 2009 Team Speedway Polish Championship (2009 Speedway Ekstraliga)
- 2009 Individual Speedway Junior Polish Championship
- 2009 Golden Helmet (Poland)
