= 2008 Silver Helmet (Poland) =

Speedway event

The 2008 Silver Helmet (Polish: Turniej o Srebrny Kask, BK) is the 2008 version of Silver Helmet organized by the Polish Motor Union (PZM).

The Final took place on October 10, 2008, in Rzeszów.

== Calendar ==
Date	Venue	Winner	Runner-up	3rd place	
Semi-Finals
21 August	Opole	Adrian Gomólski (OST)	Dawid Lampart (RZE)	Marcin Jędrzejewski (BYD)	result
21 August	Częstochowa	Maciej Janowski (WRO)	Damian Celmer (TOR)	Mateusz Szczepaniak (CZE)	result
Final
10 October	Rzeszów				result

== Semi-finals ==
=== Opole ===
- Semi-Final 1
- 2008-08-21 (17:30 pm)
- (Poland) Opole
- Referee:
- Qualify: 8 + 1R
- Attendance:
- Beat Time:
- Changes:
  - (13) Michał Łopaczewski (BYD) → (17) Idziorek
  - (16) Mateusz Szostek (RZE) → Dudek
  - (18) Łukasz Kiełbasa (TAR) → (20) Dziatkowiak

Pos.	Rider	Points	Details
1	(6) Adrian Gomólski (OST)	15	(3,3,3,3,3)
2	(14) Dawid Lampart (RZE)	12	(3,2,3,1,3)
3	(15) Marcin Jędrzejewski (BYD)	12	(2,3,2,2,3)
4	(12) Przemysław Pawlicki (LES)	11	(3,3,3,0,2)
5	(1) Rafał Fleger (OPO)	10	(2,3,1,2,2)
6	(4) Daniel Pytel (POZ)	9	(3,2,2,1,1)
7	(11) Sławomir Musielak (GNI)	9	(2,T/-,2,3,2)
8	(2) Szymon Kiełbasa (TAR)	8+3	(1,1,1,2,3)
9	(7) Grzegorz Zengota (ZIE)	8+Fx	(2,2,1,3,E1)
10	(10) Robert Kasprzak (LES)	7	(1,E3,3,2,1)
11	(16) Patryk Dudek (ZIE)	6	(1,1,0,3,1)
12	(13) Emil Idziorek (OST)	3	(0,2,0,1,0)
13	(17) Piotr Dziatkowiak (POZ)	3	(1,2)
14	(5) Janusz Baniak (ZIE)	3	(1,1,0,1,0)
15	(9) Marcel Kajzer (RAW)	2	(0,0,2,0,-)
16	(3) Sławomir Dąbrowski (OPO)	2	(0,0,1,0,1)
17	(8) Maciej Fajfer (GNI)	0	(E3,0,0,0,0)

=== Częstochowa ===
- Semi-Final 2
- 2008-08-21 (17:00 pm)
- (Poland) Częstochowa
- Referee:
- Qualify: 8 + 1R
- Attendance:
- Beat Time:
- Changes:
  - (3) Borys Mikorski (CZE) → M.Mikorski
  - (7) Adam Kajoch (LES) → (17) Piekarski
  - (9) Damian Sperz (GDA) → None
  - (18) Mateusz Sikorski (GOR) → None
  - (19) Mateusz Lampkowski (TOR) → None
  - (20) Patryk Dudek (ZIE) → He started in Opole Semi-Final

Pos.	Rider	Points	Details
1	(11) Maciej Janowski (WRO)	15	(3,3,3,3,3)
2	(2) Damian Celmer (TOR)	12	(2,2,3,2,3)
3	(1) Mateusz Szczepaniak (CZE)	11	(3,3,2,3,N)
4	(14) Michał Mitko (RYB)	11	(3,3,3,1,1)
5	(16) Adrian Szewczykowski (GOR)	10	(1,3,1,3,2)
6	(7) Marcin Piekarski (CZE)	9	(3,2,1,2,1)
7	(8) Patryk Pawlaszczyk (RYB)	9	(2,1,2,1,3)
8	(12) Kamil Brzozowski (GRU)	7+3	(2,F,2,0,3)
9	(4) Grzegorz Szyszka (KRO)	7+2	(1,2,2,2,E)
10	(15) Maciej Piaszczyński (OST)	6	(2,1,0,3,Fx)
11	(5) Sławomir Pyszny (RYB)	6	(1,2,1,0,2)
12	(3) Mateusz Mikorski (GOR)	5	(0,0,1,2,2)
13	(13) Marcin Liberski (ŁÓD)	4	(E1,1,3,0,0)
14	(10) Artur Mroczka (GRU)	3	(1,1,E,1,X)
15	(6) Paweł Gwóźdź (ZIE)	2	(0,0,0,1,1)

== Final ==
- Final
- 2008-10-10
- (Poland) Rzeszów
- Referee:
- Attendance:
- Beat Time:

Placing	Rider	Total	1	2	3	4	5	6	7	8	9	10	11	12	13	14	15	16	17	18	19	20	Pts	Pos	21
1	(5) Maciej Janowski (WRO)	12		3			3					1					2					3	12	1	
2	(14) Grzegorz Zengota (ZIE)	11				2		2					3		3							1	11	5	3
3	(15) Patryk Pawlaszczyk (RYB)	11				3			2			0						3	3				11	3	2
4	(11) Mateusz Szczepaniak (CZE)	11			2				3		3					3						E2	11	4	N
5	(12) Dawid Lampart (RZE)	11			3					3		3			2						0		11	2	Fx
6	(2) Michał Mitko (RYB)	10	3					3				2				1				1			10	6	
7	(3) Marcin Jędrzejewski (BYD)	9	2						0				2				3				2		9	7	
8	(6) Adrian Szewczykowski (GOR)	8		2				0			1							2			3		8	8	
9	(7) Daniel Pytel (POZ)	8		1					1					2	1					3			8	9	
10	(16) Szymon Kiełbasa (TAR)	8				1				2	2						1			2			8	10	
11	(10) Sławomir Musielak (GNI)	6			1			1						3			0		1				6	11	
12	(8) Marcin Piekarski (CZE)	6		0						2			E4			2			2				6	12	
13	(1) Patryk Dudek (ZIE)	3	1				2				E4				E4				0				3	13	
14	(9) Damian Celmer (TOR)	2			0		M/-						1					1		E4			2	14	
15	(13) Kamil Brzozowski (GRU)	1				0	E3							1		E3					-		1	15	
16	(4) Rafał Fleger (OPO)	0	0							0				E4				E4				-	0	16	
17	(17) Grzegorz Szyszka (KRO)	0					E4																0	17	
nc	(Res.) Mateusz Szostek (RZE)	3																			1	2	3	nc	
Placing	Rider	Total	1	2	3	4	5	6	7	8	9	10	11	12	13	14	15	16	17	18	19	20	Pts	Pos	21

m - exclusion for exceeding two minute time allowance • t - exclusion for touching the tapes • x - other exclusion • e - retired or mechanical failure • f - fell • ns - non-starter • nc - non-classify

gate A - inside	gate B	gate C	gate D - outside

== See also ==
- 2008 Individual Speedway Junior Polish Championship
