= Michał Mitko =

Polish speedway rider

- Born: 12 December 1988 (age 37); Rybnik, Poland
- Nationality: Polish

Career history

Poland
- 2006–2009, 2013: Rybnik
- 2010–2012: Opole

Team honours
- 2008: Team U-21 World Champion

Michał Mitko (born 12 December 1988 in Rybnik, Poland) is a Polish speedway rider.

== Career ==
Mitko was a Team U-21 World Champion in 2008 and was a member of Poland U-21 team.

Mitko reached the final of the 2009 Individual Speedway Junior World Championship.

Mitko rode for Rybnik and Kolejarz Opole in the Team Speedway Polish Championship from 2006 to 2013.

== Results ==
=== World Championships ===
- Individual U-21 World Championship
  - 2008 - 10th place in Qualifying Round 3
  - 2009 - (Croatia) Goričan - 14th place (3 pts)
- Team U-21 World Championship
  - 2008 - (Denmark) Holsted - World Champion (7 points)

=== European Championships ===
- Individual U-19 European Championship
  - 2007 - 8th place in Semi-Final 3

=== Domestic competitions ===
- Individual Polish Championship
  - 2008 - 15th place in Quarter-Final
  - 2009 - 11th place in Quarter-Final 2
- Individual U-21 Polish Championship
  - 2008 - (Poland) Rybnik - 11th place (6 pts)
  - 2009 - (Poland) Leszno - 11th place (6 pts)
- Team U-21 Polish Championship
  - 2008 - (Poland) Leszno - 2nd place (10 pts)
- Polish Silver Helmet (U-21)
  - 2008 - (Poland) Rzeszów - 6th place (10 pts)
  - 2009 - (Poland) Częstochowa - 12th place (4 pts)

== See also ==
- Poland national speedway team
