= 2006 Individual Speedway Junior European Championship =

Motorcycle racing competition

Seasons
- ← 2005 2007 →

The 2006 European Individual Speedway Junior Championship was the ninth edition of the Championship.

== Qualification ==
- Qualification Round:
  - (Russia) Togliatti
- Qualification Round:
  - (Norway) Elgane
- Semi-Final:
  - (Hungary) Debrecen
- Semi-Final:
  - (Poland) Ostrów Wielkopolski

== Final ==
- August 19, 2006
- (Croatia) Goričan

Placing	Rider	Total	1	2	3	4	5	6	7	8	9	10	11	12	13	14	15	16	17	18	19	20	Pts	Pos
1	(Croatia) (6) Jurica Pavlič	14		2				3			3							3			3		14	1
2	(Ukraine) (2) Andriej Karpov	11	2					E				3				3				3			11	2
3	(Denmark) (5) Lars Hansen	10		3			2					2					1					2	10	3
4	(Poland) (16) Adrian Gomólski	9				1				3	2						3			0			9	4
5	(Sweden) (14) Ricky Kling	9				2		2					3		1							1	9	5
6	(Netherlands) (1) Jannick de Jong	9	3				1				1				2				2				9	6
7	(Denmark) (13) Klaus Jakobsen	8				3	3							0		2					0		8	7
8	(Poland) (7) Marcin Jędrzejewski	8		F					X					3	3					2			8	8
9	(Czech Republic) (3) Filip Šitera	8	1						3				1				2				1		8	9
10	(Germany) (10) Kevin Wölbert	6			3			1						2			X		0				6	10
11	(Poland) (11) Mateusz Szczepaniak	6			2				1		F					0						3	6	11
12	(Denmark) (8) Kenneth Hansen	6		X						2			F			1			3				6	12
13	(Czech Republic) (9) Matěj Kůs	5			0		0						2					2		1			5	13
14	(Poland) (12) Sławomir Dąbrowski	4			1					0		1			0						2		4	14
15	(Czech Republic) (15) Hynek Štichauer	3				E			2			X						0	1				3	15
16	(Denmark) (4) Patrick Hougaard	3	X							1				1				1				0	3	16
	(Poland) (17) Sebastian Brucheiser	ns																					0	
	(Sweden) (18) Robert Pettersson	ns																					0	
Placing	Rider	Total	1	2	3	4	5	6	7	8	9	10	11	12	13	14	15	16	17	18	19	20	Pts	Pos

m - exclusion for exceeding two minute time allowance • t - exclusion for touching the tapes • x - other exclusion • e - retired or mechanical failure • f - fell • ns - non-starter • nc - non-classify

gate A - inside	gate B	gate C	gate D - outside

=== Heat details ===
1. de Jong, Karpov, Šitera, Hougaard (w)
2. L.Hansen, Pavlič, Jędrzejewski (u), K.Hansen (w)
3. Wolbert, Szczepaniak, Dąbrowski, Kůs
4. Jakobsen, Kling, Gomólski, Stichauer (d)
5. Jakobsen, L.Hansen, de Jong, Kůs
6. Pavlič, Kling, Wolbert, Karpov (d)
7. Šitera, Stichauer, Szczepaniak, Jędrzejewski (w)
8. Gomólski, K.Hansen, Hougaard, Dąbrowski
9. Pavlič, Gomólski, de Jong, Szczepaniak (u)
10. Karpov, L.Hansen, Dąbrowski, Stichauer (w)
11. Kling, Kůs, Šitera, K.Hansen (u)
12. Jędrzejewski, Wolbert, Hougaard, Jakobsen
13. Jędrzejewski, de Jong, Kling, Dąbrowski
14. Karpov, Jakobsen, K.Hansen, Szczepaniak
15. Gomólski, Šitera, L.Hansen, Wolbert (w)
16. Pavlič, Kůs, Hougaard, Stichauer
17. K.Hansen, de Jong, Stichauer, Wolbert
18. Karpov, Jędrzejewski, Kůs, Gomólski
19. Pavlič, Dąbrowski, Šitera, Jakobsen
20. Szczepaniak, L.Hansen, Kling, Hougaard
