= 2008 Individual Speedway Junior European Championship =

Motorcycle racing competition

Seasons
- ← 2007 2009 →

The 2008 European Individual Speedway Junior Championship was the eleventh edition of UEM Individual Speedway Junior European Championship. The Final took place on 30 August 2008 in Stralsund, Germany; it was second Final in Germany. Defending European Champion was Nicolai Klindt from Denmark who won in 2007 Final in Częstochowa, Poland.

== Calendar ==
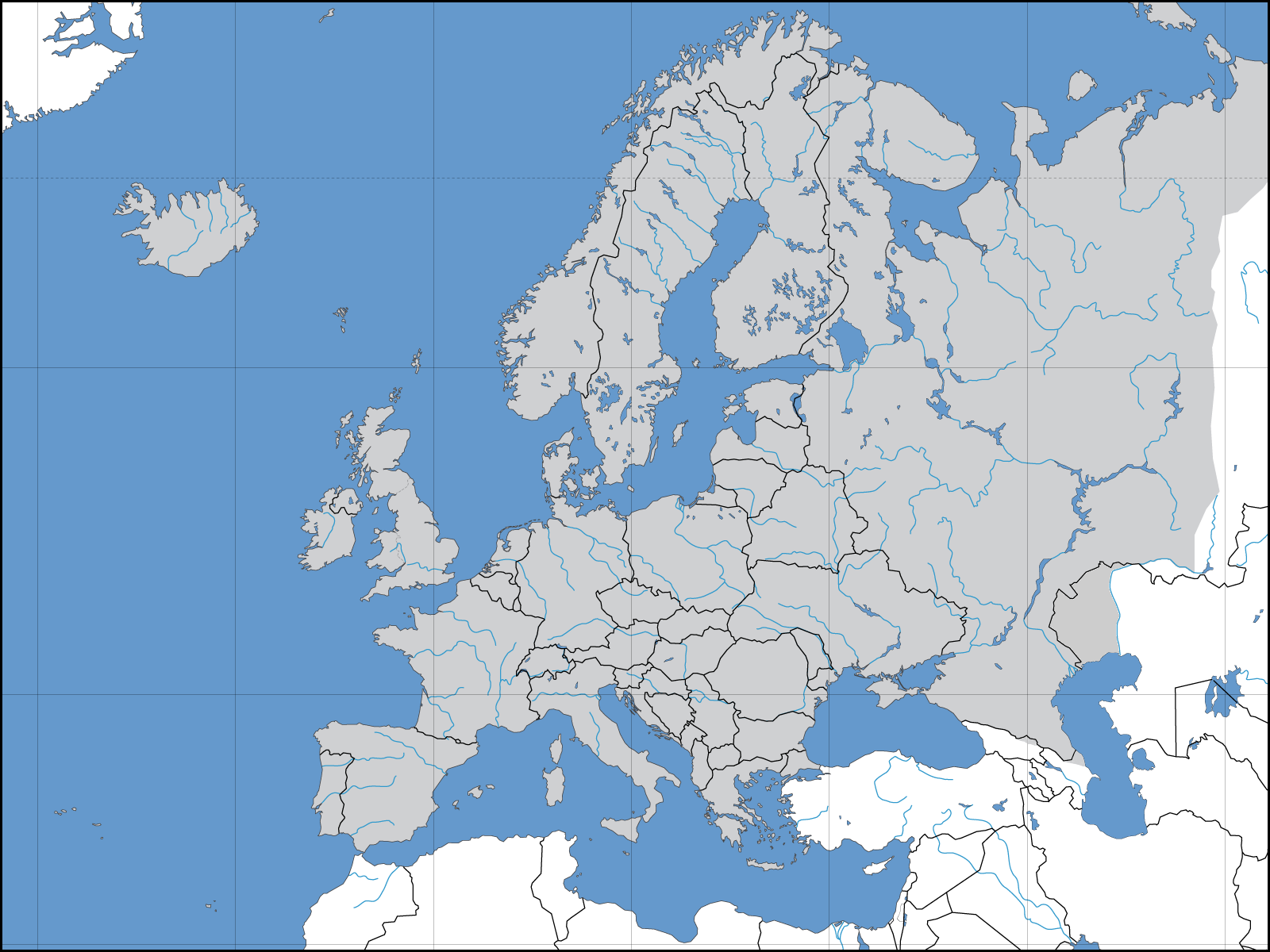

- Semi-finals - Final

Day	Venue	Winner	
Domestic Qualifications
9 April	(Poland) Rawicz	(Poland) Marcel Kajzer	result
Semi-finals
9 May	(Russia) Balakovo	(Russia) Artem Laguta	result
6 June	(Denmark) Fjelsted	(Denmark) Patrick Hougaard	result
5 July	(Slovenia) Krško	(Czech Republic) Matěj Kůs	result
Final
30 August	(Germany) Stralsund	(Poland) Artur Mroczka	result

== Allocation ==
Qualifying for the Final:

- Riders placed 1st to 5th + 1R in Semi-Final 1 and Semi-Final 2 will qualify for the Final.
- Riders placed 1st to 6th in Semi-Final 3 will qualify for the Final. But, if no Germany riders qualify for the Final, then only 5 riders will qualify from Semi-Final 3.

FMNs	Total	Semi-Finals			F
FMNs	Total	1	2	3	F
FMNs	Total	(Russia)	(Denmark)	(Slovenia)	(Germany)
Czech Republic (ACCR)	4	2		2	
(United Kingdom) Great Britain (ACU)	2			2	
Slovenia (AMZS)	2			2	
Germany (DMSB)	4	2		2	
Denmark (DMU)	6		6		
France (FFM)	1			1	
Belgium (FMB)	1			1	
Italy (FMI)	1			1	
Ukraine (FMU)	2	2			
Croatia (HMS)	1			1	

FMNs	Total	Semi-Finals			F
FMNs	Total	1	2	3	F
FMNs	Total	(Russia)	(Denmark)	(Slovenia)	(Germany)
Netherlands (KNMV)	1			1	
Latvia (LaMSF)	1	1			
Hungary (MAMS)	1	1			
Russia (MFR)	3	3			
Norway (NMF)	1		1		
Austria (OeAMTC)	1	1			
Poland (PZM)	6	3		3	
Slovakia (SMF)	1	1			
Finland (SML)	3		3		
Sweden (SVEMO)	6		6		
TOTAL	48	16	16	16	

== Domestic Qualifications ==
=== Poland ===
- Finał krajowych eliminacji do Indywidualnych Mistrzostw Europy
  (Final of Domestic Qualification to Individual European Championship)

- April 9, 2008
- (Poland) Rawicz, Florian Kapała Stadium
- Referee: ?
- Attendance: 250
- Best Time: ?
- Riders placed 1st to 5th in Domestic Final qualified for the European Semi-Finals. Sixth Polish rider (Zmarzlik) and reserve (Szewczykowski) was nominated by Main Commission of Speedway Sport (GKSŻ) which is a part of the Polish Motor Union (PZM).

Pos.	Rider	Points	Details
1	(1) Marcel Kajzer Rawicz	15	(3,3,3,3,3)
2	(2) Artur Mroczka Grudziądz	13	(2,3,3,2,2)
3	(14) Maciej Janowski Wrocław	12	(3,1,3,2,3)
4	(16) Michał Łopaczewski Bydgoszcz	10	(2,2,2,3,1)
5	(5) Borys Miturski Częstochowa	9	(3,2,2,1,1)
6	(9) Paweł Zmarzlik Gorzów Wlkp.	8+3	(1,0,2,3,2)
7	(11) Adrian Szewczykowski Gorzów Wlkp.	8+2	(2,3,1,0,2)
8	(4) Bartosz Szymura Rybnik	8+N	(1,3,3,1,F)
9	(13) Rafał Fleger Opole	7	(1,1,2,3,0)

Pos.	Rider	Points	Details
10	(10) Maciej Piaszczyński Ostrów Wlkp.	7	(3,0,1,2,1)
11	(6) Marcin Piekarski Częstochowa	7	(1,2,F,2,2)
12	(12) Emil Idziorek Ostrów Wlkp.	4	(0,0,1,0,3)
13	(8) Paweł Gwóźdź Zielona Góra	4	(F,1,0,1,2)
14	(R1) Szymon Kiełbasa Tarnów	3	(2,0,1)
15	(15) Mateusz Kowalczyk Częstochowa	2	(0,2,0,0,E)
16	(7) Dawid Lampart Rzeszów	2	(T/-,1,0,1,-)
17	(R2) Mateusz Mikorski Gorzów Wlkp.	1	(1,0)
18	(3) Piotr Korbel Rybnik	0	(0,X,-,-,-)
	(R3) Paweł Ratajszczak		
	(R4) Damian Sperz		
	(R5) Sławomir Pyszny		
R1 - heats: 2, 15, 19; R2 - heats: 11, 18

== Semi-finals ==
=== Balakovo ===
- Semi-Final 1
- May 9, 2008 (16:00)
- (Russia) Balakovo
- Referee:
- Jury President:
- Attendance 12,000
- Qualify: 5 + 1R
- Changes:
  - (2) AUT → Rider 17 (Sidorin)
  - (3) HUN (Attila Lörincz) → RUS
  - (12) POL (Paweł Zmarzlik) → RUS
  - (13) GER → RUS
  - (14) SVK → RUS

Pos.	Rider	Points	Details
1	(Russia) (8) Artem Laguta	14	(3,3,3,3,2)
2	(Russia) (15) Artem Vodyakov	13+3	(3,1,3,3,3)
3	(Germany) (16) Kevin Wölbert	13+2	(2,2,3,3,3)
4	(Poland) (9) Borys Miturski	12	(3,3,2,2,2)
5	(Russia) (13) Denis Nosov	10	(1,2,2,2,3)
6	(Latvia) (7) Maksims Bogdanovs	9	(X,3,3,3,X)
7	(Russia) (2) Jewgienij Sidorin	8	(3,3,0,1,1)
8	(Russia) (5) Andriv Kudriaschov	7	(1,1,2,0,3)
9	(Czech Republic) (6) Jan Holub III	7	(2,2,2,0,1)
10	(Poland) (4) Michał Łopaczewski	7	(2,1,1,1,2)
11	(Russia) (3) Oleg Biechastnov	6	(1,2,1,2,X)
12	(Russia) (12) Sergej Karaischenzew	5	(2,0,1,E,2)
13	(Czech Republic) (1) Michal Dudek	3	(0,0,1,2,0)
14	(Russia) (14) Maksim Ljobsenko	2	(0,1,0,X,1)
15	(Ukraine) (10) Andriy Kobrin	2	(T,0,0,1,1)
16	(Ukraine) (11) Stanislav Ogorodnik	1	(1,0,0,0,0)
17	(Russia) (17) Konstantin Below		

=== Krško ===
- Semi-Final 3
- July 5, 2008
- (Slovenia) Krško
- Referee:
- Jury President:
- Qualify: 6
- Change:
  - (2) Italian place was replaced by Germany rider
  - (8) France place was replaced by Czech rider
  - (13) Belgium place was replaced by Polish rider
  - (15) Dutch place was replaced by Track Reserve

Pos.	Rider	Points	Details
1	(Czech Republic) (11) Matěj Kůs	14	(3,3,3,2,3)
2	(Poland) (13) Dawid Lampart	13	(2,3,2,3,3)
3	(Poland) (10) Maciej Janowski	12	(2,2,3,3,2)
4	(Czech Republic) (14) Michael Hádek	11	(3,E2,3,3,2)
5	(Poland) (6) Artur Mroczka	10+3	(E3,3,2,3,2)
6	(Poland) (1) Marcel Kajzer	10+2	(3,2,1,1,3)
7	(Germany) (7) Frank Facher	10+1	(3,2,1,2,2)
8	(United Kingdom) (9) Joe Haines	9	(1,1,2,2,3)
9	(Slovenia) (5) Matija Duh	7	(2,0,3,2,X/F3)
10	(Italy) (2) Eric Pudel	6	(2,1,1,1,1)
11	(Slovenia) (4) Aleksander Čonda	5	(1,2,0,1,1)
12	(United Kingdom) (16) Jack Roberts	4	(1,3,0,0,0)
13	(Germany) (3) Max Dilger	4	(0,1,1,1,1)
14	(Croatia) (12) Nikola Pigac	3	(0,1,2,0,0)
15	(Slovenia) (15) Aljosa Remih	1	(0,0,0,0,1)
16	(Slovenia) (17) Dalibor Bot	1	(1)
17	(France) (8) Pavol Pucko	0	(T/-,0,0,0,0)

=== Fjelsted ===
- Semi-Final 2
- June 6, 2008 (19:00)
- (Denmark) Fjelsted
- Referee:
- Jury President:
- Qualify: 5 + 1R
- Change: No 6 - Lars Daniel Gunnestad (NOR) was replaced by Tord Solberg (NOR)

Pos.	Rider	Points	Details
1	(Denmark) (5) Patrick Hougaard	14	(3,3,3,3,2)
2	(Denmark) (11) Peter Kildemand	13	(3,3,3,3,1)
3	(Sweden) (14) Kim Nilsson	11	(3,2,1,2,3)
4	(Sweden) (3) Jonas Messing	10+3	(2,2,2,1,3)
5	(Denmark) (12) Simon Nielsen	10+2	(2,3,2,1,2)
6	(Sweden) (10) Linus Eklöf	10+1	(1,3,3,2,1)
7	(Sweden) (7) Dennis Andersson	10+0	(2,1,1,3,3)
8	(Denmark) (8) Peter Juul Larsen	9	(1,1,3,2,2)
9	(Sweden) (1) Linus Sundström	8	(3,0,2,0,3)
10	(Sweden) (4) Niklas Larsson	7	(0,2,2,3,0)
11	(Denmark) (2) Patrick Nørgaard	5	(1,1,1,1,1)
12	(Denmark) (15) Klaus Jakobsen	4	(2,0,0,2,0)
13	(Finland) (16) Niko Siltaniemi	4	(1,0,1,0,2)
14	(Finland) (13) Jari Mäkinen	3	(0,2,0,0,1)
15	(Finland) (9) Kalle Katajisto	1	(0,0,0,1,0)
16	(Norway) (6) Tord Solberg	0	(0,0,0,0,0)
-	(Denmark) (17) René Bach	-	-
-	(Denmark) (18) Nicki Barrett	-	-

== Final ==
- Final
- 2008-08-30 (4:00 pm)
- (Germany) Stralsund
- Referee:
- Jury President:
- Changes:
  - (12) (Czech Republic) Matěj Kůs → Facher → Andersson
  - (15) (Sweden) Jonas Messing → (18) Eklöf
  - (17) (Latvia) Maksims Bogdanovs → None

Placing	Rider	Total	1	2	3	4	5	6	7	8	9	10	11	12	13	14	15	16	17	18	19	20	Pts	Pos	21
1	(Poland) (2) Artur Mroczka	13	2					2				3				3				3			13	1	
2	(Poland) (6) Maciej Janowski	12		3				X			3							3			3		12	2	3
3	(Russia) (7) Artem Vodyakov	12		2					3					3	3					1			12	3	2
4	(Denmark) (16) Patrick Hougaard	11				3				1	2						3			2			11	4	
5	(Russia) (10) Artem Laguta	10			3			3						2			2						10	5	
6	(Germany) (1) Kevin Wölbert	9	3				3				1				0				2				9	6	
7	(Sweden) (12) Dennis Andersson	9			2					2		2			2						1		9	7	
8	(Sweden) (15) Linus Eklöf	8				2			2			1						2	1				8	8	
9	(Sweden) (8) Kim Nilsson	7		0						0			3			1			3				7	9	
10	(Denmark) (14) Simon Nielsen	7				1		1					1		1							3	7	10	
11	(Poland) (13) Dawid Lampart	7				0	2							1		2					2		7	11	
12	(Czech Republic) (9) Michael Hádek	5			1		1						2					1		0			5	12	
13	(Poland) (5) Marcel Kajzer	4		1			0					0					1					2	4	13	
14	(Poland) (4) Borys Miturski	3	0							3				0				N				N	3	14	
15	(Russia) (11) Denis Nosov	2			0				1		0					0						1	2	15	
16	(Denmark) (3) Peter Kildemand	1	1						E				0				0				0		1	16	
Placing	Rider	Total	1	2	3	4	5	6	7	8	9	10	11	12	13	14	15	16	17	18	19	20	Pts	Pos	21

m - exclusion for exceeding two minute time allowance • t - exclusion for touching the tapes • x - other exclusion • e - retired or mechanical failure • f - fell • ns - non-starter • nc - non-classify

gate A - inside	gate B	gate C	gate D - outside

Heat after heat:

1. Woelbert, Mroczka, Kildemand, Miturski
2. Janowski, Wodjakow, Kajzer, Nilsson
3. Laguta, Andersson, Hadek, Nosov
4. Hougaard, Ekloef, Nielsen, Lampart
5. Woelbert, Lampart, Hadek, Kajzer
6. Laguta, Mroczka, Nielsen, Janowski (X)
7. Wodjakow, Ekloef, Nosov, Kildemand (E)
8. Miturski, Andersson, Hougaard, Nilsson
9. Janowski, Hougaard, Woelbert, Nosov
10. Mroczka, Andersson, Ekloef, Kajzer
11. Nilsson, Hadek, Nielsen, Kildemand
12. Wodjakow, Laguta, Lampart, Miturski
13. Wodjakow, Andersson, Nielsen, Woelbert
14. Mroczka, Lampart, Nilsson, Nosov
15. Hougaard, Laguta, Kajzer, Kildemand
16. Janowski, Ekloef, Hadek
17. Nilsson, Woelbert, Ekloef, Laguta (E)
18. Mroczka, Hougaard, Wodjakow, Hadek
19. Janowski, Lampart, Andersson, Kildemand
20. Nielsen, Kajzer, Nosov
  Run-Off:
21. Janowski, Wodjakow

Pos.	Rider	Points	Details
1	(Poland) (2) Artur Mroczka	13	(2,2,3,3,3)
2	(Poland) (6) Maciej Janowski	12+3	(3,X,3,3,3)
3	(Russia) (7) Artem Vodyakov	12+2	(2,3,3,3,1)
4	(Denmark) (16) Patrick Hougaard	11	(3,1,2,3,2)
5	(Russia) (10) Artem Laguta	10	(3,3,2,2,E)
6	(Germany) (1) Kevin Wölbert	9	(3,3,1,0,2)
7	(Sweden) (18) Dennis Andersson	9	(2,2,2,2,1)
8	(Sweden) (15) Linus Eklöf	8	(2,2,1,2,1)
9	(Sweden) (8) Kim Nilsson	7	(0,0,3,1,3)
10	(Denmark) (14) Simon Nielsen	7	(1,1,1,1,3)
11	(Poland) (13) Dawid Lampart	7	(0,2,1,2,2)
12	(Czech Republic) (9) Michael Hádek	5	(1,1,2,1,0)
13	(Poland) (5) Marcel Kajzer	4	(1,0,0,1,2)
14	(Poland) (4) Borys Miturski	3	(0,3,0,N,N)
15	(Russia) (11) Denis Nosov	2	(0,1,0,0,1)
16	(Denmark) (3) Peter Kildemand	1	(1,d,0,0,0)
