= 2005 Individual Speedway Junior European Championship =

Motorcycle racing competition

Seasons
- ← 2004 2006 →

The 2005 European Individual Speedway Junior Championship was the eighth edition of the Championship.

== Qualification ==
- Scandinavian Final (Semi-Final A):
  - May 28, 2005
  - (Sweden) Målilla
- Semi-Final B:
  - July 30, 2005
  - (Croatia) Prelog
- Semi-Final C:
  - August 7, 2005
  - (Latvia) Daugavpils

== Final ==
- August 20, 2005
- (Czech Republic) Mšeno Speedway Stadium, Mšeno
- Emil Sayfutdinov was excluded because he was too young. Sayfutdinov (5th in Semi-Final C) was replaced by Maksims Bogdanovs (6th in Semi-Final C and 2nd track reserve in Final). Bogdanovs as 2nd track reserve was replaced by Marcin Jędrzejewski (7th in Semi-Final C).
- 21 heat: Race stopped: Buczkowski crashed. Buczkowski excluded.
- 21 heat restart: Race stopped: Kling crashed. Kling excluded.
- Re-restart was canceled because of rain. Pettersson have three "3" (Hlib only two "3") and he was third.

Placing	Rider	Total	1	2	3	4	5	6	7	8	9	10	11	12	13	14	15	16	17	18	19	20	Pts	Pos	21
1	(Poland) (5) Karol Ząbik	14		3			3					3					3					2	14	1	
2	(Latvia) (15) Kasts Poudzuks	11				3			3			1						3	1				11	2	
3	(Sweden) (2) Robert Pettersson	10	3					0				2				2				3			10	3	N
4	(Poland) (4) Paweł Hlib	10	1							3				2				1				3	10	4	N
5	(Sweden) (1) Ricky Kling	10	2				1				3				1				3				10	5	F/X
6	(Poland) (6) Krzysztof Buczkowski	10		1				3			2							2			2		10	6	F/X
7	(Austria) (7) Fritz Wallner	9		2					X					3	2					2			9	7	
8	(Germany) (13) Kevin Wölbert	9				2	2							1		3					1		9	8	
9	(Sweden) (12) Andreas Messing	8			T					2		E			3						3		8	9	
10	(Croatia) (17) Jurica Pavlič	5			3														2				5	10	
11	(France) (9) Mathieu Tresarrieu	5			1		F						3					1		0			5	11	
12	(Czech Republic) (10) Luboš Tomíček, Jr.	5			2			1						0			2		0				5	12	
13	(Poland) (14) Patryk Pawłaszczyk	5				1		2					1		0							1	5	13	
14	(Denmark) (3) Jan Graversen	3	0						1				2				0				0		3	14	
15	(Sweden) (11) Robin Törnqvist	2			0				2		0					E						0	2	15	
16	(Denmark) (16) Klaus Jakobsen	2				F				0	1						1			0			2	16	
17	(Latvia) (8) Maksims Bogdanovs	1		0						1			X			E			T				1	17	
18	(Poland) (18) Marcin Jędrzejewski unknown heat (14 or 18)	1																					0	18	
Placing	Rider	Total	1	2	3	4	5	6	7	8	9	10	11	12	13	14	15	16	17	18	19	20	Pts	Pos	21

m - exclusion for exceeding two minute time allowance • t - exclusion for touching the tapes • x - other exclusion • e - retired or mechanical failure • f - fell • ns - non-starter • nc - non-classify

gate A - inside	gate B	gate C	gate D - outside
