= Damian Sperz =

Polish speedway rider

- Born: 29 March 1990 (age 36); Poland
- Nationality: Poland
- Website: Official website

Current club information
- Polish league: Wybrzeże Gdańsk

Career history
- 2006-2010: Gdańsk (POL)

Individual honours
- 2008 - 4th placed: U-19 Bronze Helmet

Damian Sperz (born 29 March 1990) is a Polish speedway rider who is a member of the Polish under-21 national team.

== Career details ==
=== World Championships ===
- Individual U-21 World Championship
  - 2009 - lost in the Domestic Qualification Final
  - 2010 - 1 pt in the Gdańsk' Final One (lost in the Gdańsk' Qualifying Round also)

=== European Championships ===
- Individual U-19 European Championship
  - 2008 - as a track reserve in the Domestic Qualification
  - 2009 - lost in the Semi-Final One

=== Domestic competitions ===
- Individual Polish Championship
  - 2008 - lost in the Gdańsk' Quarter-Final
  - 2009 - lost in the Piła' Quarter-Final
- Individual U-21 Polish Championship
  - 2008 - lost in the Poznań' Semi-Final
  - 2009 - lost in the Gniiezno' Qualifying Round
- Silver Helmet (U-21)
  - 2008 - windraw from the Częstochowa' Semi-Final
  - 2009 - (Poland) Częstochowa - 15th placed (3 pts)
  - 2010 - (Poland) Bydgoszcz - quality to the Final (August 12)
- Bronze Helmet (U-19)
  - 2008 - (Poland) Gdańsk - 4th placed (11 pts)
  - 2009 - (Poland) Wrocław - 7th placed (8 pts)

== See also ==
- Poland national speedway team
