= 2007 Individual Speedway Junior European Championship =

Motorcycle racing competition

2007 Individual Under-19 European Championship

Seasons
- ← 2006 2008 →

The 2007 European Individual Speedway Junior Championship was the 10th UEM Individual Speedway Junior European Championship season. The Final took place on August 19, 2007, in Częstochowa, Poland. European Championship was won by Nicolai Klindt from Denmark.

== Calendar ==
Race format
Gate	A (inside)	B	C	D (outside)
Heat No	Riders starting No
1	1	2	3	4
2	5	7	6	8
3	10	11	9	12
4	15	14	16	13
5	13	1	5	9
6	14	10	2	6
7	11	15	7	3
8	4	8	12	16
9	6	16	1	11
10	12	5	15	2
11	8	9	3	14
12	13	4	10	7
13	7	12	14	1
14	2	13	8	11
15	16	3	10	5
16	9	6	4	15
17	1	8	15	10
18	9	2	7	16
19	3	12	13	6
20	5	14	11	4

Day	Venue	Winner	
Domestic Qualifications
13 April	(Poland) Opole	(Poland) Maciej Piaszczyński	result
Qualifying Round
28 April	(Romania) Brăila	canceled	result
Semi-Finals
28 May	(Hungary) Miskolc	(Croatia) Jurica Pavlič	result
9 June	(Finland) Seinäjoki	(Denmark) Nicolai Klindt	result
14 July	(Latvia) Daugavpils	(Slovakia) Martin Vaculík or (Germany) Kevin Wölbert	result
Final
19 August	(Poland) Częstochowa	(Denmark) Nicolai Klindt	result

== Domestic Qualifications ==
=== Poland ===
- Final of Domestic Qualification to Individual Junior European Championship
- April 13, 2007
- (Poland) Opole
- Referee: Wojciech Grodzki
- Attendance: 400
- Best Time: 62.3 - Grzegorz Zengota in 1st heat
- Riders placed 1st to 4th in Domestic Final was qualify to the European Semi-Finals. Fifth Polish rider (Łopaczewski) was nominated (as wild card) by Main Commission of Speedway Sport (GKSŻ). Next 3 riders (Miturski, Szewczykowski and Kajoch) was started in Championships also, because they replaced riders from another country.

Pos.	Rider	Points	Details
1	(16) Maciej Piaszczyński (POZ)	13	(3,3,2,2,3)
2	(4) Michał Mitko (RYB)	12	(2,2,2,3,3)
3	(1) Grzegorz Zengota (ZIE)	10+2+3+3	(3,1,1,2,3)
4	(3) Rafał Fieger (RYB)	10+3+2	(0,3,2,3,2)
5	(2) Michał Łopaczewski (ŁÓD)	10+3+1	(1,3,3,2,1)
6	(9) Borys Miturski (CZE)	10+1+2+0	(3,0,3,2,2)
7	(6) Adrian Szewczykowski (GOR)	10+2+1	(2,1,3,1,3)
8	(13) Adam Kajoch (LES)	9	(0,2,3,3,1)
9	(5) Piotr Korbel (WRO)	9	(3,3,1,1,1)
10	(12) Rafał Klimek (LUB)	8	(2,1,2,3,0)
11	(15) Mateusz Kowalczyk (CZE)	6	(2,2,0,0,2)
12	(14) Mateusz Jurga (LES)	5	(1,2,1,1,E)
13	(11) Bartosz Szymura (OPO)	3	(1,X,0,E,2)
14	(17) Kamil Mistygacz (CZE)	2	(1,E,1)
15	(18) Emil Idziorek (OST)	1	(0,1,D,F,D)
16	(8) Marcel Kajzer (RAW)	1	(1,0,X,-,N)
17	(7) Damian Baliński jr (RAW)	0	(0,F,-,-,N)
18	(10) Marcin Piekarski (CZE)	0	(0,-,-,-,-)
Gates in 21st: A - Szewczykowski, B - Łopaczewski; Gates in 22nd: A - Fleger, B - Zengota, C - Miturski; Gates in 23rd: A - Zengota, B - Miturski, C - Szewczykowski; Gates in 24th: A - Fleger, B - Łopaczewski, C - Miturski, D - Zengota (17) Mistygacz - heats: 7, 12, 14 (18) Idziorek - heats: 6, 12, 13, 15, 17
Heat Times: 1-8: 62.3 - 63.1 - 63.5 - 63.2 - 63.2 - 62.9 - 63.8 - 64.1; 9-16: 65.6 - 65.7 - 63.9 - 64.5 - 66.3 - 64.8 - 64.9 - 63.9; 17-24: 67.4 - 66.3 - 65.8 - 63.9 - 67.3 - 67.2 - 65.7 - 64.8

== Qualification ==
- Semi-Final A:
  - May 28, 2007
  - (Hungary) Miskolc
- Semi-Final B:
  - June 9, 2007
  - (Finland) Seinäjoki
- Semi-Final C:
  - July 14, 2007
  - (Latvia) Daugavpils

== Final ==
- August 19, 2007
- (Poland) Częstochowa

Placing	Rider	Total	1	2	3	4	5	6	7	8	9	10	11	12	13	14	15	16	17	18	19	20	Pts	Pos	21
1	(Denmark) (16) Nicolai Klindt	14				3				2	3						3			3			14	1	
2	(Croatia) (10) Jurica Pavlič	11			3			1						3			1		3				11	2	
3	(Czech Republic) (11) Filip Šitera	10			2				3		0					2						3	10	5	3
4	(Poland) (4) Borys Miturski	10	3							3				2				1				1	10	6	2
5	(Sweden) (8) Thomas H. Jonasson	10		3						0			3			3			1				10	4	1
6	(Slovakia) (12) Martin Vaculík	10			0					1		3			3						3		10	3	0
7	(Russia) (2) Artem Laguta	9	2					3				2				0				2			9	7	
8	(Germany) (13) Kevin Wölbert	8				2	3							1		1					1		8	8	
9	(Poland) (9) Adam Kajoch	7			1		1						1					3		1			7	9	
10	(Poland) (1) Grzegorz Zengota	7	F/X				2				1				2				2				7	10	
11	(Germany) (5) Tobias Busch	7		2			F					1					2					2	7	11	
12	(Latvia) (6) Maksims Bogdanovs	6		0				2			2							0			2		6	12	
13	(Denmark) (15) Patrick Hougaard	5				1			2			0						2	0				5	13	
14	(Sweden) (3) Linus Sundström	3	E						1				2				0				0		3	14	
15	(Denmark) (14) Anders Andersen	1				0		0					0		1							0	1	15	
16	(Poland) (7) Maciej Piaszczyński	1		1					0					0	E					0			1	16	
	(Hungary) (17) Jozsef Tabaka	0																					0		
	(Denmark) (18) Klaus Jakobsen	0																					0		
Placing	Rider	Total	1	2	3	4	5	6	7	8	9	10	11	12	13	14	15	16	17	18	19	20	Pts	Pos	21

m - exclusion for exceeding two minute time allowance • t - exclusion for touching the tapes • x - other exclusion • e - retired or mechanical failure • f - fell • ns - non-starter • nc - non-classify

gate A - inside	gate B	gate C	gate D - outside

Heat after heats:
1. Miturski, Laguta, Sundstroem (E3), Zengota (F/X)
2. Jonasson, Busch, Piaszczyński, Bogdanow
3. Pavlič, Šitera, Kajoch, Vaculik
4. Klindt, Wölbert, Hougaard, Andersen
5. Wölbert, Zengota, Kajoch, Busch (F4)
6. Laguta, Bogdanow, Pavlič, Andersen
7. Šitera, Hougaard, Sundstroem, Piaszczyński
8. Miturski, Klindt, Vaculik, Jonasson
9. Klindt, Bogdanow, Zengota, Šitera
10. Vaculik, Laguta, Busch, Hougaard
11. Jonasson, Sundstroem, Kajoch, Andersen
12. Pavlič, Miturski, Wölbert, Piaszczyński
13. Vaculik, Zengota, Andersen, Piaszczyński (E3)
14. Jonasson, Šitera, Wölbert, Laguta
15. Klindt, Busch, Pavlič, Sundstroem
16. Kajoch, Hougaard, Miturski, Bogdanow
17. Pavlič, Zengota, Jonasson, Hougaard
18. Klindt, Laguta, Kajoch, Piaszczyński
19. Vaculik, Bogdanow, Wölbert, Sundstroem
20. Šitera, Busch, Miturski, Andersen
  3-6 place
21. Šitera, Miturski, Jonasson, Vaculik

Pos.	Rider	Points	Heats
1	(Denmark) (16) Nicolai Klindt	14	(3,2,3,3,3)
2	(Croatia) (10) Jurica Pavlič	11	(3,1,3,1,3)
3	(Czech Republic) (11) Filip Šitera	10+3	(0,3,0,2,3)
4	(Poland) (4) Borys Miturski	10+2	(3,3,2,1,1)
5	(Sweden) (8) Thomas H. Jonasson	10+1	(3,0,3,3,1)
6	(Slovakia) (12) Martin Vaculík	10+0	(0,1,3,3,3)
7	(Russia) (2) Artem Laguta	9	(2,3,2,0,2)
8	(Germany) (13) Kevin Wölbert	8	(2,3,1,1,1)
9	(Poland) (9) Adam Kajoch	7	(1,1,1,3,1)
10	(Poland) (1) Grzegorz Zengota	7	(X,2,1,2,2)
11	(Germany) (5) Tobias Busch	7	(2,F,1,2,2)
12	(Latvia) (6) Maksims Bogdanovs	6	(0,2,2,0,2)
13	(Denmark) (15) Patrick Hougaard	5	(1,2,0,2,0)
14	(Sweden) (3) Linus Sundström	3	(E,1,2,0,0)
15	(Denmark) (14) Anders Andersen	1	(0,0,0,1,0)
16	(Poland) (7) Maciej Piaszczyński	1	(1,0,0,E,E)
	(Hungary) (17) Jozsef Tabaka		
	(Denmark) (18) Klaus Jakobsen		
