= Marcin Jędrzejewski =

Polish speedway rider

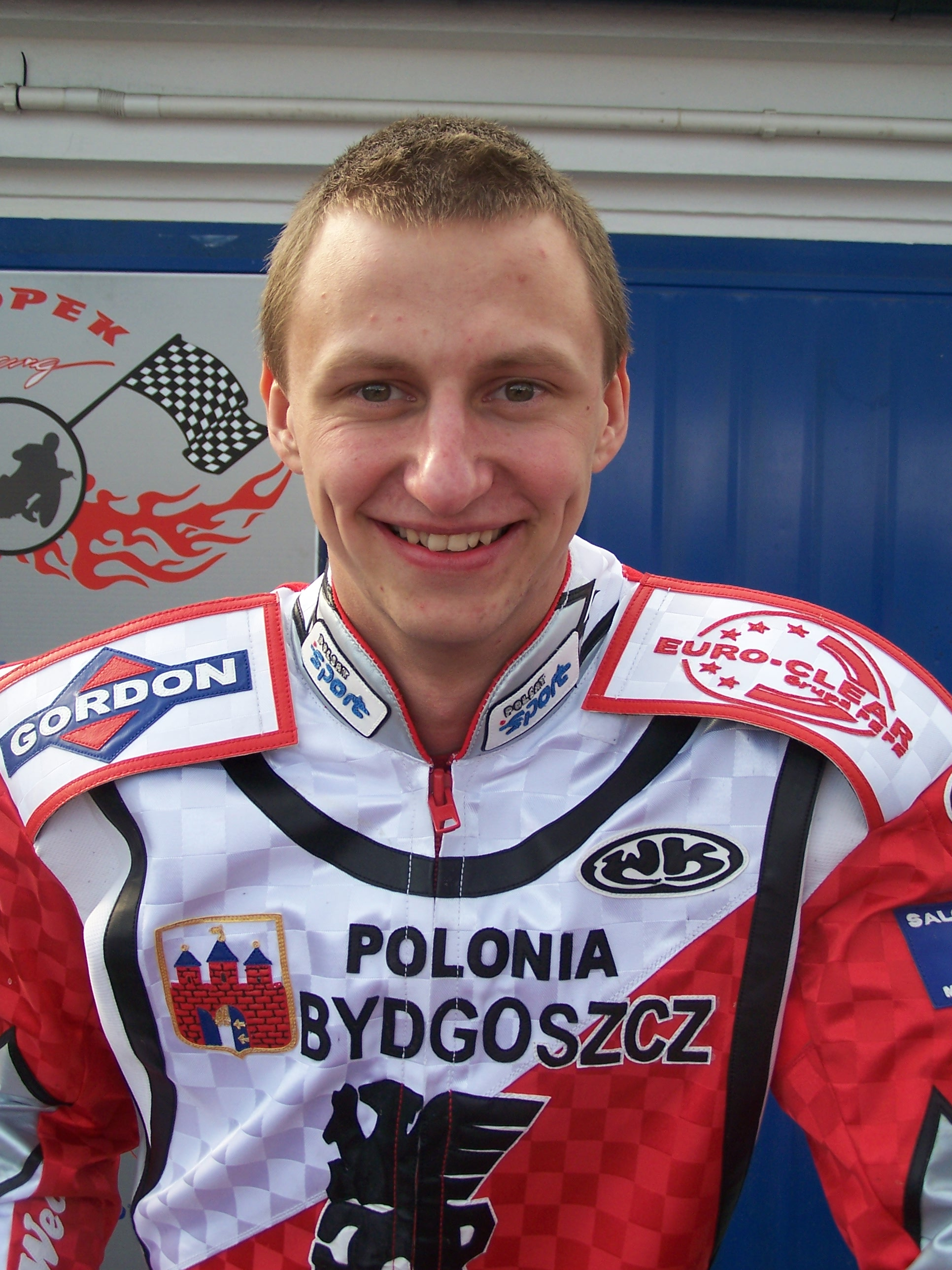
- Born: 10 April 1987 (age 39); Tuchola, Poland
- Nationality: Polish

Career history

Poland
- 2003–2009, 2014–2017, 2019: Bydgoszcz
- 2010: Łódź
- 2011, 2013: Opole
- 2012, 2022: Piła
- 2018: Kraków
- 2020: Krosno
- 2021: Wittstock

Denmark
- 2006–2007: Outrup

Sweden
- 2006: Team Bikab

Individual honours
- 2007: Silver Helmet Winner (U-21)

Marcin Jędrzejewski (born 10 April 1987 in Tuchola, Poland) is a motorcycle speedway rider from Poland.

== Career ==
Jędrzejewski has ridden for the Polish national junior team. He started riding in 2003.

In Poland, Jędrzejewski primarily rode for Bydgoszcz from 2003 to 2009, from 2014 to 2017 and again in 2019. In 2012, he rode for Polonia Piła.

== Results ==
=== World Championships ===
- Individual U-21 World Championship
  - 2007 - 13th place in Semi-Final B
  - 2008 - 1st Track Reserve in Qualifying Round 2 (0 heats)
- Team U-21 World Championship
  - 2005 - 2nd place in Semi-Final C (as Polish team II - track reserve)
  - 2007 - started in Semi-Final A only

=== European Championships ===
- Individual U-19 European Championship
  - 2005 - (Czech Republic) Mšeno - 18th place (1 point as track reserve)
  - 2006 - (Croatia) Goričan - 8th place (8 points)

=== Domestic competitions ===
- Individual Polish Championship
  - 2006 - 11th place in Quarter-Final B
  - 2009 - 17th place in Quarter-Final 1 as track reserve
- Individual U-21 Polish Championship
  - 2005 - 4th place (10+2 points as track reserve)
  - 2006 - 10th place (6 points)
  - 2007 - 16th place (1 point)
  - 2008 - Rybnik - 12th place (5 points)
- Polish Under-21 Pairs Championship
  - 2004 - 5th place (2 points)
  - 2005 - 6th place (4 points)
  - 2006 - Silver medal (10 points)
- Team Polish Championship
  - 2003 - Bronze medal with Polonia Bydgoszcz
  - 2004 - 5 place with Polonia Bydgoszcz
  - 2005 - Silver medal with Polonia Bydgoszcz
  - 2006 - Bronze medal Polonia Bydgoszcz
- Team U-21 Polish Championship
  - 2004 - 5th place (3 points)
  - 2005 - 4th place (3 points)
  - 2006 - 2nd place in Qualification Group C
  - 2007 - Last round in Qualification Group A will be on September 15
- Silver Helmet (U-21)
  - 2006 - 11th place (5 points)
  - 2007 - Winner (15 points)
  - 2008 - (Poland) Rzeszów - 7th place (9 points)
- Bronze Helmet (U-19)
  - 2004 - 12th place in Semi-Final B
  - 2005 - Bronze medal (11 points)
  - 2006 - Bronze medal (12+2+2+1 points)

== See also ==
- Polish national speedway team
