= Artur Mroczka =

Polish speedway rider

- Born: 2 November 1989 (age 37); Grudziądz, Poland
- Nickname: Archi, Niki
- Nationality: Polish

Career history

Poland
- 2006-2010: Grudziądz
- 2011: Gorzów
- 2014: Gdańsk
- 2015-2021: Tarnów
- 2022-2023: Piła
- 2025: Kraków

Great Britain
- 2010: Poole
- 2012-2013: Belle Vue

Denmark
- 2009: Holstebro
- 2010–2013: Outrup

Sweden
- 2025: Örnarna

Individual honours
- 2008: U-19 European Champion
- 2008: Bronze Helmet Winner (U-19)

Team honours
- 2008, 2009: Team U-21 World Champion

Artur Mroczka (born 2 November 1989 in Poland) is a motorcycle speedway rider from Poland.

== Career ==
Mroczka was a member of the Poland U-21 national team. In 2008, he won the Team U-21 World Championship, Individual U-19 European Championship and Polish Bronze Helmet (U-19). In 2009 he again won the Team U-21 World Championship title with Poland.

In the British leagues, Mroczka rode for Poole Pirates in 2010 and Belle Vue Aces from 2012 to 2013.

== Results ==
=== Speedway Grand Prix ===
2010 SGP
	Grand Prix	Pos.	Pts.	Heats	Draw
—	(Poland) Toruń	17	0	(Fx)	17

permanent speedway rider
wild card, track reserve or qualified reserve
rider not classified (track reserve who did not start)

=== World Championships ===
- Individual World Championship (Speedway Grand Prix)
  - 2010 - one heat in the Toruń SGP
- Individual U-21 World Championship
  - 2009 - 16th place in Semi-Final 2
- Team U-21 World Championship
  - 2008 - (Denmark) Holsted - U-21 World Champion (9 points)
  - 2009 - (Poland) Gorzów Wlkp. - U-21 World Champion (11 pts)

=== European Championships ===
- Individual U-19 European Championship
  - 2008 - (Germany) Stralsund - European Champion (13 points)

=== Domestic competitions ===
- Individual Polish Championship
  - 2009 - 9th place in Quarter-Final 1
- Individual U-21 Polish Championship
  - 2007 - 12th place
  - 2008 - (Poland) Rybnik - 8th place (8 ps)
  - 2009 - (Poland) Leszno - 7th place (9 pts)
- Individual Latvian Championship
  - 2007 - 9th place (7 pts)
- Polish Silver Helmet (U-21):
  - 2008 - 14th place in Semi-Final 2 (3 pts)
  - 2009 - (Poland) Częstochowa - 7th place (9 pts)
- Polish Bronze Helmet (U-19)
  - 2008 - (Poland) Gdańsk - Winner (13 pts)

== See also ==
- Poland national speedway team
