= Marcel Kajzer =

Polish speedway rider

- Born: 16 April 1990 (age 36)
- Nationality: Polish

Career history

Poland
- 2006–2008, 2014–2016, 2020: Rawicz
- 2009: Gniezno
- 2010: Ostrów
- 2011: Częstochowa
- 2017–2019: Poznań

Denmark
- 2009: Fjelsted
- 2018: Esbjerg

Great Britain
- 2012: Belle Vue

Marcel Kajzer (born 16 April 1990) is a former motorcycle speedway rider from Poland.

== Career ==
Kajzer was a member of the Poland U-19 national team.

For the 2009 season, Kajzer rode for Start Gniezno (Poland), Fjelsted (Denmark) and Mseno (Czech Republic).

In 2012, Kajzer appeared for the Belle Vue Aces in two matches during the 2012 Elite League speedway season.

Kajzer retired from speedway in 2020.

== Results ==
=== World Championships ===
- Individual U-21 World Championship
  - 2009 – Lost in Domestic Qualifications

=== European Championships ===
- Individual U-19 European Championship
  - 2007 – Lost in Domestic Qualifications
  - 2008 – (Germany) Stralsund – 13th place (4 points)
  - 2009 – 10th place in Semi-Final 3
- Team U-19 European Championship
  - 2008 – (Poland) Rawicz – 4th place (2 points)

=== Domestic competitions ===
- Individual Polish Championship
  - 2008 – 16th place in Quarter-Final 4
- Individual U-21 Polish Championship
  - 2008 – 14th place in Semi-Final 2
  - 2009 – 10th place in Qualifying Round 3
- Silver Helmet (U-21)
  - 2008 – 15th place in Semi-Final 1
- Bronze Helmet (U-19)
  - 2008 – 13th place in Semi-Final 1

== See also ==
- Poland national speedway team
- Speedway in Poland
