= Sławomir Musielak =

Polish speedway rider

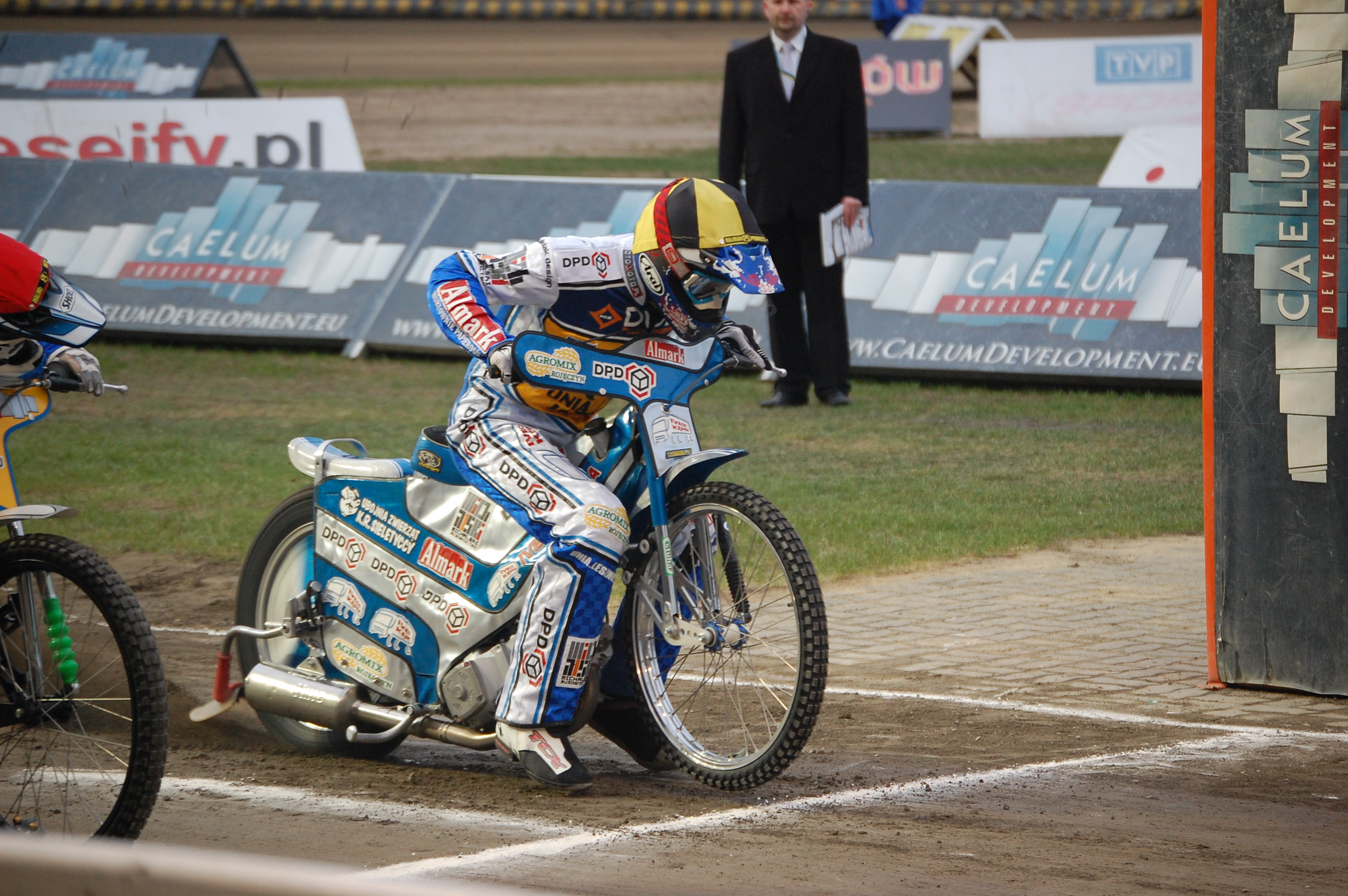
- Born: 3 June 1990 (age 36)
- Nationality: Polish

Career history

Poland
- 2006, 2009–2011: Leszno
- 2008: Gniezno
- 2012–2013: Rawicz

Denmark
- 2008: Holsted

Individual honours
- 2009 - 2nd placed: U-21 Polish Championship
- 2009 - 3rd placed: U-21 Silver Helmet

Team honours
- 2008: U-21 Polish Champion
- 2009: Team U-19 European Champion

Sławomir Musielak (born 3 June 1990) is a former motorcycle speedway rider from Poland.

== Career ==
Musielak was a member of the Polish junior national team. Musielak finished 2nd in the 2009 Individual Speedway Junior Polish Championship and was third in the 2009 Silver Helmet Final.

== Results ==
=== World Championships ===
- Individual U-21 World Championship
  - 2009 - Lost in Domestic Qualification

=== European Championships ===
- Individual U-19 European Championship
  - 2009 - (Poland) Tarnów - 6th place (9 pts)
- Team U-19 European Championship
  - 2009 - (Denmark) Holsted - U-19 European Champion (1 pt)
- European Club Champions' Cup
  - 2008 - 4th place in the Semi-Final for Leszno

=== Domestic competitions ===
- Individual Polish Championship
  - 2008 - track reserve in the Quarter-Final 4
  - 2009 - (Poland) Toruń - the Final will be on 25 July (as track reserve)
- Individual Speedway Junior Polish Championship
  - 2009 - (Poland) Leszno - Runner-up (13 pts + 2nd in Run-Off)
- Team Polish Championship (League)
  - 2006 - for Leszno
  - 2007 - did not start
  - 2008 - 1st place in Second League for Gniezno (Average 1.297)
  - 2009 - for Leszno
- Individual U-21 Polish Championship
  - 2008 - 12th place in the Semi-Final 2
  - 2009 - the Qualifying Round 3 will be on 15 July
- Team U-21 Polish Championship
  - 2008 - (Poland) Leszno - Polish Champion for Leszno (9 pts)
  - 2009 - (Poland) Toruń - 3rd place (10 pts)
- Silver Helmet (U-21)
  - 2008 - (Poland) Rzeszów - 11th place (6 pts)
  - 2009 - (Poland) Częstochowa - 3rd place (12+2 pts)
- Bronze Helmet (U-19)
  - 2008 - (Poland) Gdańsk - 10th place (6 pts)
  - 2009 - (Poland) Wrocław - 4th place (12 pts)
- Bolesław Chrobry Tournament
  - 2008 - (Poland) Gniezno - did not start as track reserve

== See also ==
- Poland national speedway team
- Speedway in Poland
