= Dawid Lampart =

Polish speedway rider

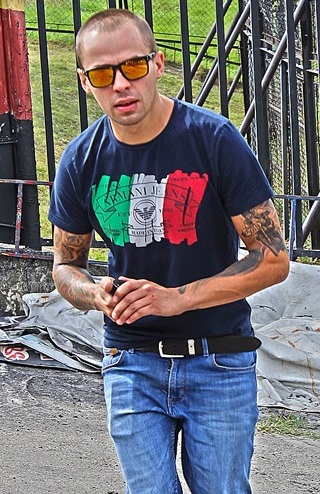
- Born: 4 August 1990 (age 36)
- Nationality: Polish

Career history

Poland
- 2007–2011, 2013, 2015-2017, 2020, 2022: Rzeszów
- 2012, 2021: Tarnów
- 2013: Krosno
- 2014, 2018-2019: Motor Lublin
- 2020: Bydgoszcz

Great Britain
- 2010–2011: Eastbourne
- 2012, 2019: Swindon

Denmark
- 2015–2018: Holsted
- 2019: Slangerup

Individual honours
- 2009 - 3rd placed: U-21 Polish Championship

Team honours
- 2009: Team U-21 World Champion
- 2009: Team U-19 European Championship
- 2012: British Elite League

Dawid Lampart (born 4 August 1990) is a motorcycle speedway rider from Poland.

== Career ==
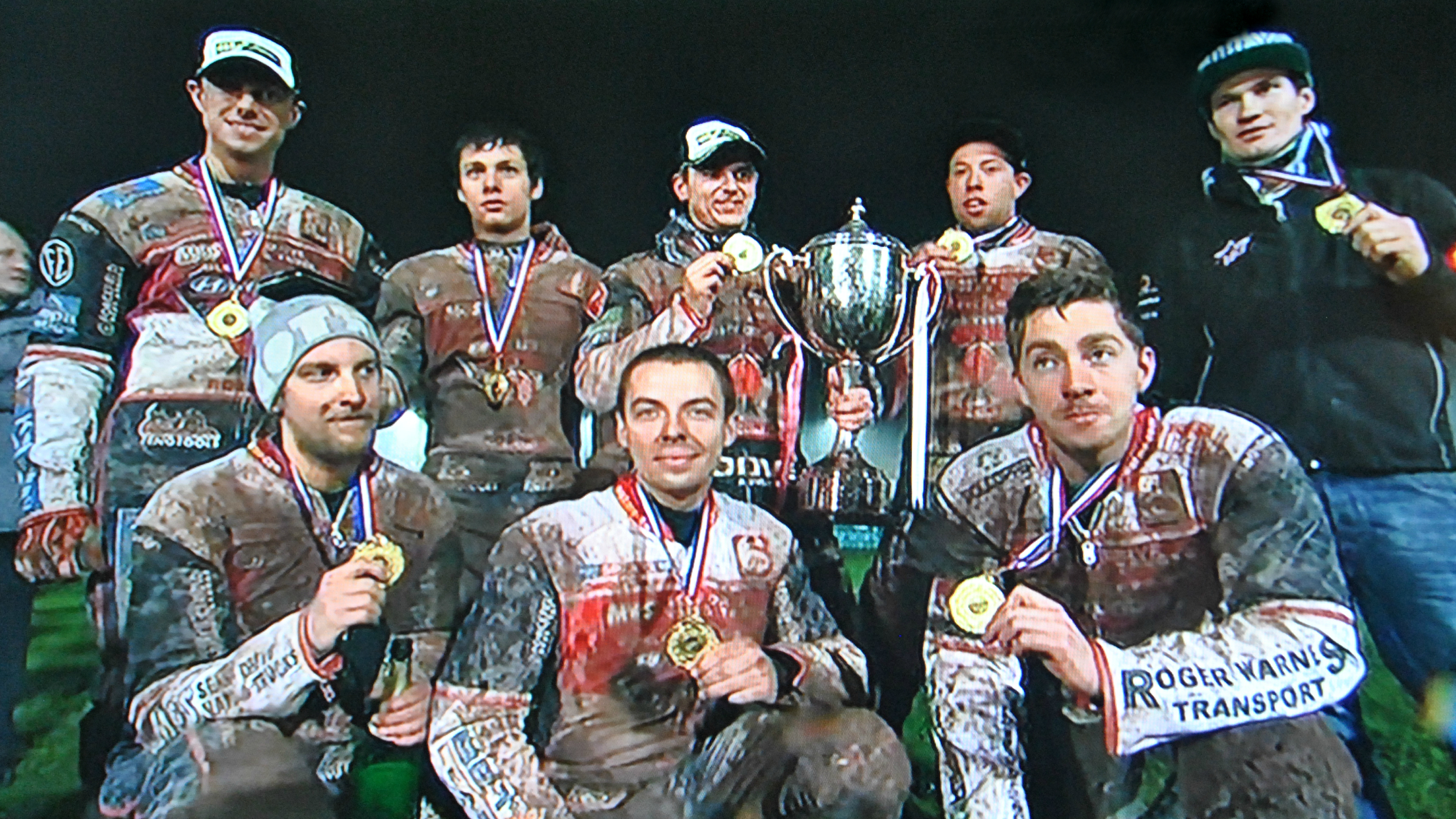
Lampart (front centre) celebrating the league win with Swindon in 2012

Lampart was a member of the Poland U-21 and U-19 national teams. Lampart won the 2009 Under-21 World Cup, 2009 Team U-19 European Championship and finished third at the 2009 Individual Speedway Junior Polish Championship.

In Britain, Lampart rode for the Eastbourne Eagles and the Swindon Robins and won the 2012 Elite League with Swindon.

== Results ==
=== World Championships ===
- Individual U-21 World Championship
  - 2009 - Lost in Domestic Qualifications
- Team U-21 World Championship (Under-21 World Cup)
  - 2009 - (Poland) Gorzów Wlkp. - U-21 World Champion (5 pts)

=== European Championships ===
- Individual U-19 European Championship
  - 2008 - (Germany) Stralsund - 11th place (7 pts)
  - 2009 - (Poland) Tarnów - 9th place (7 pts)
- Team U-19 European Championship
  - 2008 - (Poland) Rawicz - 4th place (7 pts)
  - 2009 - (Denmark) Holsted - U-19 European Champion (7 pts)

=== Domestic competitions ===
- Individual Polish Championship
  - 2009 - 16th place in Semi-Final 2
- Individual U-21 Polish Championship
  - 2008 - (Poland) Rybnik - 13th place (4 pts)
  - 2009 - (Poland) Leszno - 3rd place (12 pts)
- Team U-21 Polish Championship
  - 2007 - (Poland) Rybnik - 3rd place for Rzeszów (12 pts) - Average 2.100
  - 2008 - 4th place in Group C
- Silver Helmet (U-21)
  - 2008 - (Poland) Rzeszów - 5th place (11 pts)
  - 2009 - (Poland) Częstochowa - 4th place (11 pts)
- Bronze Helmet (U-19)
  - 2008 - (Poland) Gdańsk - 9th place (6 pts)
  - 2009 - (Poland) Wrocław - 8th place (7 pts)

== See also ==
- Poland national speedway team
