= Borys Miturski =

Polish speedway rider

- Born: 20 June 1989 (age 37); Częstochowa, Poland
- Nationality: Poland

Current club information
- Polish league: Włókniarz Częstochowa

Career history
- 2005-: Częstochowa (POL)

Borys Miturski (born 20 June 1989 in Częstochowa, Poland) is a Polish speedway rider who is a member of Poland U-21 national team. He was fourth in 2007 Individual U-19 European Championship.

Miturski's father Krzysztof and uncle Michał was speedway rider also in 1980s.

== Career details ==
=== World Championships ===
- Individual U-21 World Championship
  - 2009 - Lost in Domestic Qualifications

=== European Championships ===
- Individual European Championship
  - 2008 - 13th place in Semi-Final 2
- Individual U-19 European Championship
  - 2007 - (Poland) Częstochowa - 4th place (10 pts +2)
  - 2008 - (Germany) Stralsund - 14th place (3 pts)
- Team U-19 European Championship
  - 2008 - (Poland) Rawicz - 4th place (2 pts)

=== Domestic competitions ===
- Individual Polish Championship
  - 2009 - 16th place in Quarter-Final 4
- Individual U-21 Polish Championship
  - 2008 - (Poland) Rybnik - 15th place (1 pt)
  - Silver Helmet (U-21)
  - 2009 - (Poland) Częstochowa - 11th place (5 pts)
- Bronze Helmet (U-19)
  - 2008 - (Poland) Gdańsk - 11th place (5 pts)

== See also ==
- Poland national speedway team
