= 2008 Individual Speedway Junior Polish Championship =

The 2008 Individual Speedway Junior Polish Championship (Polish: Młodzieżowe Indywidualne Mistrzostwa Polski, MIMP) is the 2008 version of Individual Speedway Junior Polish Championship organized by the Polish Motor Union (PZM).

The Final took place on August 19, 2008, in Rybnik. The last time the Final took place in Leszno in the 2003 season, with Łukasz Romanek beating Adrian Miedziński and Zbigniew Czerwiński.

== Calendar ==
Date	Venue	Winner	Runner-up	3rd place	
Semi-Finals
10 July	Tarnów	Robert Kasprzak (LES)	Przemysław Pawlicki (LES)	Adrian Gomólski (OST)	result
10 July	Poznań	Patryk Pawlaszczyk (RYB)	Grzegorz Zengota (ZIE)	Kamil Brzozowski (GRU)	result
Final
19 August	Rybnik	Maciej Janowski (WRO)	Daniel Pytel (POZ)	Grzegorz Zengota (ZIE)	result

== Semi-finals ==
=== Tarnów ===
- Semi-Final 1
- 2008-07-03 ( pm)
- (Poland) Tarnów, Municipal Stadium
- Referee: ?
- Qualify: 8 + 1R
- Attendance: ?
- Beat Time: ?

Pos.	Rider	Points	Details
1	(15) Robert Kasprzak (LES)	14	(3,2,3,3,3)
2	(16) Przemysław Pawlicki (LES)	14	(2,3,3,3,3)
3	(7) Adrian Gomólski (OST)	13	(3,3,3,2,2)
4	(14) Mateusz Szczepaniak (CZE)	10	(1,3,1,3,2)
5	(13) Borys Miturski (CZE)	8	(0,E,2,3,3)
6	(1) Marcin Jędrzejewski (BYD)	8	(3,2,1,0,2)
7	(2) Michał Łopaczewski (BYD)	8	(2,2,2,1,1)
8	(6) Mateusz Szostek (RZE)	8	(2,1,2,1,2)
9	(5) Dawid Lampart (RZE)	7+3	(Fx,3,0,1,3)
10	(12) Szymon Kiełbasa (TAR)	7+E	(3,1,1,1,1)
11	(3) Rafał Fleger (OPO)	6	(1,1,2,2,E)
12	(8) Maciej Piaszczyński (OST)	5	(1,2,E,2,E)
13	(R1) Sławomir Pyszny (RYB)	3	(3)
14	(10) Bartosz Szymura (RYB)	3	(2,0,0,0,1)
15	(4) Sławomir Dąbrowski (OPO)	3	(0,E,1,2,E)
16	(9) Grzegorz Szyszka (KRO)	2	(1,1,T/-,0,0)
17	(R3) Kacper Gomólski (GNI)	1	(1)
18	(11) Marcin Liberski (ŁÓD)	0	(0,0,0,-,-)
19	(R2) Emil Idziorek (OST)	0	(0)
-	(R4) Tadeusz Kostro (TAR)	-	-

(10) Kamil Zieliński (TAR) > (R1) Szymura
(R6) Łukasz Kiełbasa (TAR) > None
Heat 11: Szyszka (T) > Pyszny
Heat 14: Liberski > Idziorek
Heat 20: Liberski > K.Gomólski

=== Poznań ===
- Semi-Final 2
- 2008-07-10 ( pm)
- (Poland) Poznań, Olimpia Poznań Stadium
- Referee: Wojciech Grodzki
- Qualify: 8 + 1R
- Attendance: 1,000
- Beat Time: 66.30 secs - Grzegorz Zengota in Heat 6 - New Track Record

Pos.	Rider	Points	Details
1	(11) Patryk Pawlaszczyk (RYB)	13	(3,1,3,3,3)
2	(14) Grzegorz Zengota (ZIE)	13	(3,3,2,3,2)
3	(3) Kamil Brzozowski (GRU)	12	(2,2,3,2,3)
4	(6) Adam Kajoch (LES)	11	(3,2,2,2,2)
5	(1) Maciej Janowski (WRO)	10	(1,3,1,2,3)
6	(10) Michał Mitko (RYB)	10	(2,1,2,3,2)
7	(7) Adrian Szewczykowski (GOR)	9	(1,3,3,1,1)
8	(2) Artur Mroczka (GRU)	8	(0,0,3,2,3)
9	(16) Daniel Pytel (POZ)	7+3	(1,3,E1,1,2)
10	(4) Damian Sperz (GDA)	7+2	(3,0,1,3,0)
11	(8) Damian Celmer (TOR)	5	(2,2,0,0,1)
12	(13) Sławomir Musielak (LES)	4	(2,0,0,1,1)
13	(9) Mateusz Lampkowski (TOR)	4	(1,2,1,E3,Fx)
14	(12) Marcel Kajzer (RAW)	3	(Fx,1,2,E4,0)
15	(5) Marcin Piekarski (CZE)	2	(0,1,E3,0,1)
16	(R1) Mateusz Mikorski (GOR)	1	(0,1)
17	(R2) Janusz Baniak (ZIE)	0	(F4,0)
18	(15) Piotr Dziatkowiak (POZ)	0	(F3,-,-,-,-)

(8) Paweł Zmarzlik (GOR) > (R2) Celmer
(13) Patryk Dudek (ZIE) > (R3) Musielak
(R1) Paweł Gwóźdź (ZIE) > (R4) Mikorski
(R5) Paweł Ratajszczak (RAW) > (R6) Baniak
Heat 7:Dziatkowski > Mikorski
Heat 10:Dziatkowski > Baniak
Heat 16:Dziatkowski > Mikorski
Heat 17:Dziatkowski > Baniak

== Final ==
=== Day 1 (canceled) ===
- Final
- 2008-08-15 (6:00)
- (Poland) Rybnik, Municipal Stadium
- Referee: Ryszard Bryła
- Attendance: ?
- Beat Time: ?

Heat after heat:

1. Szczepaniak, Gomólski, Kajoch, Miturski
2. Janowski, Pawlaszczyk, Mitko, Łopaczewski
3. Jędrzejewski, Brzozowski, Zengota, Pawlicki
4. Mroczka, Szewczykowski, Kasprzak, Szostek

The Final was canceled, because was rain.

=== Day 2 ===
- Final
- 2008-08-19 (6:00)
- (Poland) Rybnik, Municipal Stadium
- Referee: Ryszard Bryła
- Attendance:
- Beat Time:

Placing	Rider	Total	1	2	3	4	5	6	7	8	9	10	11	12	13	14	15	16	17	18	19	20	Pts	Pos	21
1	(6) Maciej Janowski (WRO)	13		3				3			3							1			3		13	1	3
2	(18) Daniel Pytel (POZ)	13								2				3				2		3		3	13	2	2
3	(9) Grzegorz Zengota (ZIE)	12			2		3						2					3		2			12	3	
4	(12) Przemysław Pawlicki (LES)	11			3					3		2			3						0		11	4	
5	(3) Adrian Gomólski (OST)	10	3						3				X				3				1		10	5	
6	(5) Patryk Pawlaszczyk (RYB)	10		2			1					3					2					2	10	6	
7	(14) Robert Kasprzak (LES)	9				2		1					3		2							1	9	7	
8	(13) Artur Mroczka (GRU)	8				0	2							2		2					2		8	8	
9	(1) Mateusz Szczepaniak (CZE)	7	2				0				1				1				3				7	9	
10	(15) Adrian Szewczykowski (GOR)	6				3			2			0						0	1				6	10	
11	(8) Michał Mitko (RYB)	6		1						1			1			1			2				6	11	
12	(10) Marcin Jędrzejewski (BYD)	5			1			2						1			1		0				5	12	
13	(17) Dawid Lampart (RZE)	4						0				1				3				E			4	13	
14	(16) Mateusz Szostek (RZE)	3				1				Fx	2						0			Fx			3	14	
15	(4) Borys Miturski (CZE)	1	1							M/-				-				-				-	1	15	
16	(7) Michał Łopaczewski (BYD)	0		0					E3					0	0					F/-			0	16	
17	(11) Kamil Brzozowski (GRU)	0			0				E/st		E4					E						M	0	17	
18	(2) Adam Kajoch (LES)	0	Fx					-				-				-				-			0	18	
Placing	Rider	Total	1	2	3	4	5	6	7	8	9	10	11	12	13	14	15	16	17	18	19	20	Pts	Pos	21

m - exclusion for exceeding two minute time allowance • t - exclusion for touching the tapes • x - other exclusion • e - retired or mechanical failure • f - fell • ns - non-starter • nc - non-classify

gate A - inside	gate B	gate C	gate D - outside
