= Grzegorz Zengota =

Polish speedway rider (born 1988)

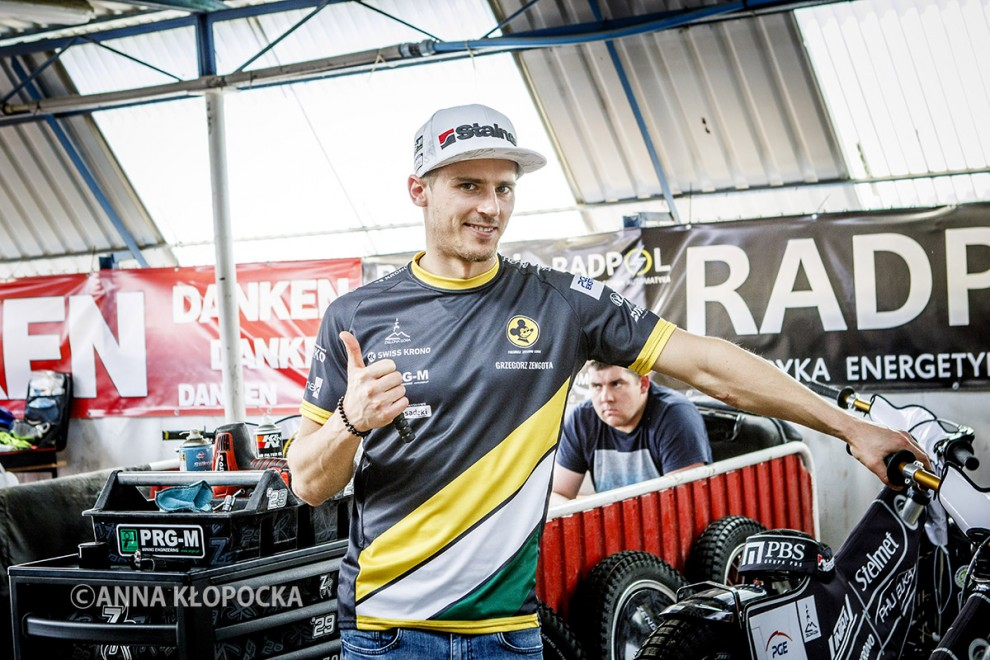
- Zengota in 2018
- Born: 29 August 1988 (age 38); Zielona Góra, Poland
- Nickname: Zengi
- Nationality: Polish
- Website: Official website

Career history

Poland
- 2006–2011, 2018, 2027: Zielona Góra
- 2012: Częstochowa
- 2013–2017, 2023–2026: Leszno
- 2020–2021: Bydgoszcz
- 2022: Rybnik

Great Britain
- 2010–2011, 2015: Swindon
- 2013: Coventry

Sweden
- 2007: Masarna
- 2009, 2025: Dackarna
- 2011, 2016, 2021: Indianerna
- 2012: Piraterna
- 2013: Vargarna
- 2014, 2022, 2024: Smederna
- 2017: Vetlanda
- 2018: Västervik
- 2023: Rospiggarna

Denmark
- 2008, 2021: Holsted
- 2012: Slangerup
- 2014–2015, 2022, 2025: Esbjerg
- 2018: Fjelsted
- 2023: Region Varde

Germany
- 2015: Norden

Individual honours
- 2009: U-21 Silver Helmet Winner

Team honours
- 2008, 2009: Team U-21 World Champion

Grzegorz Zengota [ˈɡrzɛɡɔrz ˈzɛnɡɔta] (born 29 August 1988) is a Polish motorcycle speedway rider.

== Biography ==
Zengota was born on 29 August 1988, in Zielona Góra.

Zengota was a member of Poland U-21 national team. He has won Under-21 Speedway World Cup twice, in 2008 and 2009.

In the Team Speedway Polish Championship, Zengota rode for Zielona Góra, Włókniarz Częstochowa, Unia Leszno, Polonia Bydgoszcz and Rybnik.

In the British leagues, Zengota rode for Swindon Robins and Coventry Bees.

In 2022, Zengota helped Smederna win the Swedish Speedway Team Championship during the 2022 campaign.

== Honours ==
=== World Championships ===
- Individual U-21 World Championship
  - 2009 - (Croatia) Goričan - 7th place (8 pts)
- Team U-21 World Championship
  - 2008 - (Denmark) Holsted - U-21 World Champion (8 points)
  - 2009 - (Poland) Gorzów Wlkp. - U-21 World Champion (13 pts)

=== European Championships ===
- Individual U-19 European Championship:
  - 2007 (Poland) Częstochowa - 10th place (7 points)
- European Club Champions' Cup
  - 2009 - 4rd place in the Semi-Final

=== Domestic competitions ===
- Individual U-21 Polish Championship:
  - 2008 - Rybnik - Bronze medal (12 points)
  - 2009 - (Poland) Leszno - 4th place (11 pts)
- Team U-21 Polish Championship:
  - 2005 - Rzeszów - Bronze medal (7 points)
  - 2008 - (Poland) Leszno - 4th place (11 points)
- Polish Silver Helmet (U-21)
  - 2007 - Rybnik - 2nd place (12 points +2)
  - 2008 - (Poland) Rzeszów - 2nd place (11+3 points)
  - 2009 - (Poland) Częstochowa - Winner (14 pts)
- Bronze Helmet U-19:
  - 2005 - Zielona Góra - 11th place (6 points)
  - 2007 - Gorzów Wlkp. - 5th place (9 points)

== See also ==
- Poland national speedway team
