= Adrian Gomólski =

Polish speedway rider

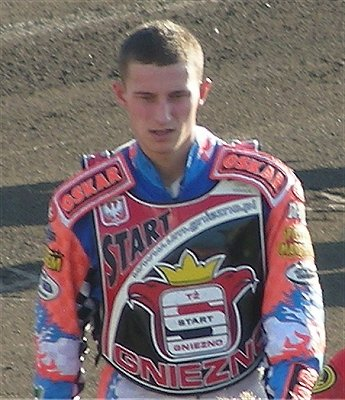
- Born: 29 April 1987 (age 39); Gniezno, Poland
- Nationality: Polish

Career history

Poland
- 2003–2007, 2010 2014–2015: Start Gniezno
- 2008–2009, 2011–2012: Ostrów
- 2013: Zielona Góra
- 2015: Rawicz
- 2015–2016: Opole

Sweden
- 2004–: DalaKraft Avesta

Great Britain
- 2007: Poole

Denmark
- 2014: Holsted
- 2015: Holstebro

Team honours
- 2007: Under-21 World Cup

Adrian Gomólski (born 29 April 1987) is a former international motorcycle speedway rider from Poland.

== Career ==
Gomólski represented the Poland national U-21 team. He started his speedway career in 2003.

In 2007, Gomólski rode for Poole Pirates in the British leagues.

== Family ==
Gomólski's father Jacek and his brother Kacper were both speedway riders.

== Results ==
=== World Championships ===
- Individual U-21 World Championship
  - 2007 – 2nd track reserve
- Team U-21 World Championship (U-21 World Cup)
  - 2005 – 2nd in Semi-Final C (8 points) with track reserve team
  - 2007 – World Champion (10 points)
  - 2008 – injury before the Final (14 points in Qualifying Round 2)

=== European Championships ===
- Individual U-19 European Championship
  - 2006 – 4th place – 9 points (1,3,2,3,0)

=== Domestic competitions ===
- Individual U-21 Polish Championship
  - 2004 – 10th place in Semi-Final
  - 2005 – 15th place in Semi-Final
  - 2006 – 8th place – 7 points (1,2,1,2,1)
  - 2008 – Rybnik – 5th place (10 points)
- Polish Under-21 Pairs Championship
  - 2004 – 6th place in Semi-Final
  - 2005 – 6th place in Semi-Final
  - 2006 – 6th place in Semi-Final
- Silver Helmet (U-21)
  - 2004 – 11th place in Semi-Final
  - 2005 – 12th place – 4 points (0,0,0,2,2)
  - 2006 – Bronze medal – 11 points (2,2,2,2,3)
  - 2007 – Bronze medal – 12+e points (1,3,3,2,3)
- Bronze Helmet (U-19)
  - 2004 – 15th place – 3 points (1,X,0,1,1)
  - 2005 – 4th place – 10 points (0,3,2,3,2)
  - 2006 – 6th place – 10 points (3,3,E,3,1)
- Mieczysław Połukard Criterium of Polish Speedway Leagues Aces – (Poland) Bydgoszcz
  - 2007 – 16th place – 1 point (0,0,1,0,0)

== See also ==
- Poland national speedway team
- Speedway in Poland
