= Maciej Piaszczyński =

Polish speedway rider

- Born: 28 May 1989 (age 37); Pleszew, Poland
- Nationality: Polish

Career history

Poland
- 2005, 2008: Ostrów
- 2006–2007: Poznań
- 2009: Łódź

Denmark
- 2000–2000: Fjelsted

Maciej Piaszczyński (born 28 May 1989 in Pleszew, Poland) is a former international motorcycle speedway rider from Poland.

== Career ==
Piaszczyński has represented Poland U-21 national team.

== Results ==
=== World Championships ===
- Individual U-21 World Championship:
  - 2007 - 11th place (4 pts) in Qualifying Round 4
  - 2009 - Lost in Domestic Qualifications
- Team U-21 World Championship:
  - 2007 - 10 points in Qualifying Round

=== European Championships ===
- Individual U-19 European Championship:
  - 2007 - (Poland) Częstochowa - 16th place (1 pt)

=== Domestic competitions ===
- Individual Polish Championship
  - 2008 - 10th place in Quarter-Final 3
  - 2009 - 16th place in Quarter-Final 2
- Individual U-21 Polish Championship:
  - 2007 - 6th place
  - 2008 - 12th in Semi-Final 1
  - 2009 - 10th place in Qualifying Round 2
- Team Polish Championship (Polish League):
  - 2006 with PSŻ Milion Team Poznań in 3rd division - CMA 6.71
  - 2007 with PSŻ Milion Team Poznań 5th place in 2nd division - CMA 5.75
- Polish Silver Helmet (U-21):
  - 2007 - (Poland) Rybnik - 4th place
  - 2008 - 10th place in Semi-Final 2
  - 2009 - (Poland) Częstochowa - 16th place (1 pt)
- Polish Bronze Helmet (U-19):
  - 2006 - (Poland) Opole - 7th place
  - 2007 - (Poland) Gorzów Wlkp. - 15th place
  - 2008 - (Poland) Gdańsk - 16th place (3 pts)
- U-21 Individual Championship of Greater Poland:
  - 2005 - 2nd place
  - 2006 - 5th place
  - 2007 - 2nd place
- U-21 Team Championship of Greater Poland:
  - 2005 - Champion
  - 2007 - Champion

== See also ==
- Poland national speedway team
