= Kacper Gomólski =

Polish speedway rider (born 1993)

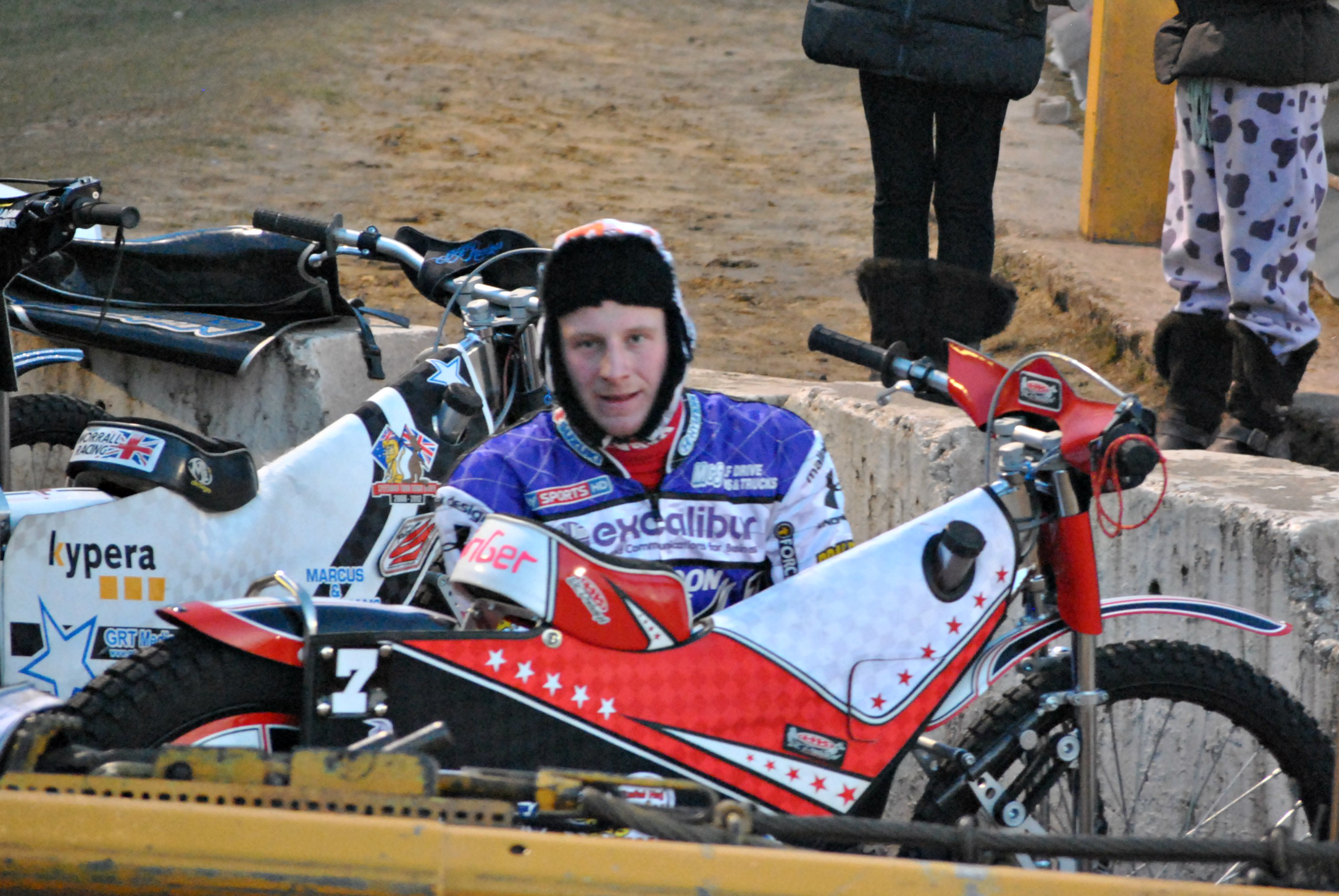
- Born: 2 March 1993 (age 33); Gniezno, Poland
- Nationality: Polish

Career history

Poland
- 2008–2011, 2024: Gniezno
- 2012–2014: Tarnów
- 2015–2016: Toruń
- 2017, 2019–2020: Gdańsk
- 2018: Zielona Góra
- 2021: Rybnik
- 2022: Poznań

Great Britain
- 2011: Peterborough
- 2013: Swindon
- 2015: Poole
- 2017: Leicester

Sweden
- 2015: Lejonen
- 2016–2017, 2019: Dackarna
- 2018: Indianerna
- 2022: Masarna

Denmark
- 2013–2018: Grindsted
- 2021: Esbjerg

Kacper Gomólski (['kat͡spɛr ˈɡɔmulski]; born 2 March 1993 in Gniezno, Poland) is a Polish motorcycle speedway rider.

== Career ==
Gomólski, the younger brother of fellow Speedway rider Adrian Gomólski and son of Jacek Gomólski, began his Polish Speedway career in 2008, racing for hometown club Start Gniezno who he rode for until 2011. He moved to Unia Tarnów for three seasons and then on to Unibax Toruń for two more. He has since ridden for Gdańsk for three seasons, Zielona Góra (2018), Rybnik (2021) and Poznań in 2022.

Gomólski was given his first opportunity in British Speedway by the Peterborough Panthers, before moving to the Swindon Robins at the age of just 19. He endured a tough season at Swindon and he found himself without a club in the Britain for the 2014 season. In 2015, Gomólski was back in British Speedway, this time with reigning Elite League champions the Poole Pirates. Poole promoter Matt Ford defended the decision to sign Gomólski, insisting that he would prove to be "an absolute steal" and that he is a "dramatically different" rider now to the one that most British Speedway fans would remember from the Swindon Robins.

In 2022, Gomólski helped PSŻ Poznań win the 2022 2.Liga.
