= Klaus Jakobsen =

Danish speedway rider

- Born: 30 January 1989 (age 37); Aaby, Aarhus, Denmark
- Nationality: Danish

Career history

Denmark
- 2004–2006: Slangerup
- 2008: Brovst
- 2009–2011: Vojens

Great Britain
- 2008-2010: Stoke
- 2009: Coventry
- 2009: Peterborough
- 2010: Swindon
- 2010: Birmingham
- 2012: Belle Vue
- 2012: Sheffield
- 2012: Berwick

Klaus Jakobsen (born 30 January 1989) is a speedway rider from Denmark.

== Speedway career ==
Jakobsen began his British career riding for Stoke Potters in 2008.

Jakobsen continued to ride for Stoke during the 2009 and 2010 seasons. He then rode in the top tier of British Speedway, riding for the Peterborough Panthers during the 2010 Elite League speedway season.
