= 2008 Individual Speedway Polish Championship =

The 2008 Individual Speedway Polish Championship (Polish: Indywidualne Mistrzostwa Polski, IMP) is the 2008 version of Individual Speedway Polish Championship organized by the Polish Motor Union (PZM).

The final took place on August 9, 2008, in Leszno. The last time the final was held in Leszno was in the 1989 Polish speedway season when Wojciech Załuski beat Jan Krzystyniak and Tomasz Gollob. Defending Champion Rune Holta (Gorzów Wlkp.) was 12th. First time Individual Polish Championship was won by Adam Skórnicki (Poznań, former Leszno's rider) who beat former permanent Grand Prix riders Jarosław Hampel (Leszno) and Grzegorz Walasek (Zielona Góra). Tomasz Gollob (Gorzów Wlkp.) who won Polish Championship 7 time was 4th.

== Calendar ==
Date	Venue	Winner	Runner-up	3rd place	
Quarter-Finals
5 June	Gdańsk	Zbigniew Czerwiński (OST)	Tomasz Chrzanowski (GDA)	Krzysztof Jabłoński (GDA)	result
5 June	Opole	Sebastian Ułamek (CZE)	Grzegorz Zengota (ZIE)	Tomasz Jędrzejak (WRO)	result
5 June	Krosno	Piotr Protasiewicz (ZIE)	Tomasz Gapiński (CZE)	Dawid Stachyra (RZE)	result
5 June	Gniezno	Jarosław Hampel (LES)	Robert Kościecha (TOR)	Adam Skórnicki (POZ)	result
Semi-Finals
3 July	Bydgoszcz	Tomasz Gollob (GOR)	Krzysztof Jabłoński (GDA)	Sebastian Ułamek (CZE)	result
3 July	Gorzów Wlkp.	Jarosław Hampel (LES)	Rune Holta (GOR)	Adrian Gomólski (OST)	result
Final
9 August	Leszno	Adam Skórnicki (POZ)	Jarosław Hampel (LES)	Grzegorz Walasek (ZIE)	result

== Quarter-finals ==
=== Gdańsk ===
- Quarter-Final - Gdańsk
- 5 June 2008 (6:00 pm)
- (Poland) Gdańsk
- Referee:
- Attendance: 1,000
- Qualify to Bydgoszcz's Semi-Final: the top 6 riders + Tomasz Gollob (GOR) and Krystian Klecha (TAR) and two track reserves

Pos.	Rider	Points	Details
1	(15) Zbigniew Czerwiński (OST)	14	(3,3,3,2,3)
2	(1) Tomasz Chrzanowski (GDA)	12	(3,2,2,3,2)
3	(2) Krzysztof Jabłoński (GDA)	11	(2,3,1,3,2)
4	(11) Grzegorz Knapp (RAW)	11	(3,1,3,2,2)
5	(8) Sławomir Drabik (TAR)	10+3	(3,3,3,0,1)
6	(6) Adrian Miedziński (TOR)	10+2	(1,2,1,3,3)
7	(5) Wiesław Jaguś (TOR)	10+1	(2,0,2,3,3)
8	(3) Rafał Okoniewski (BYD)	8	(0,2,2,2,2)
9	(13) Norbert Kościuch (POZ)	6	(0,1,3,1,1)
10	(4) Adam Kajoch (LES)	6	(1,2,2,1,0)
11	(7) Artur Mroczka (GRU)	6	(X,X,1,2,3)
12	(9) Ronnie Jamroży (RAW)	5	(0,3,1,Fx,1)
13	(12) Piotr Świst (BYD/DAU)	4	(2,1,0,1,E)
14	(16) Emil Idziorek (OST)	3	(2,0,0,1,E4)
15	(14) Damian Sperz (GDA)	2	(1,0,0,0,1)
16	(10) Piotr Dym (RAW)	2	(1,1,E4,-,-)
17	(17) Cyprian Szymko (GDA)	0	(0,0)

- (14) Alan Marcinkowski (POZ) → D.Sperz
- (15) Marcin Liberski (ŁÓD) → (R1) Z.Czerwiński
- (16) Zbigniew Suchecki (POZ) → (R3) E.Idziorek
- (R2) Sebastian Brucheiser (ŁÓD) → C.Szymko

=== Krosno ===
- Quarter-Final - Krosno
- 5 June 2008 (5:00 pm)
- (Poland) Krosno
- Referee: Rafał Pokrzywa
- Attendance: 1,500
- Beat Time: 71.1 - Maciej Kuciapa in Heat 14
- Qualify to Gorzów's Semi-Final: the top 6 riders + Rune Holta (GOR) and Grzegorz Walasek (ZIE) and two track reserves

Pos.	Rider	Points	Details
1	(9) Piotr Protasiewicz (ZIE)	14	(3,2,3,3,3)
2	(5) Tomasz Gapiński (CZE)	13	(3,1,3,3,3)
3	(11) Dawid Stachyra (RZE)	12	(2,3,3,2,2)
4	(10) Roman Povazhny (RZE)	11	(0,3,3,2,3)
5	(3) Jacek Rempała (TAR)	11	(3,2,2,1,3)
6	(13) Maciej Kuciapa (RYB)	11	(2,3,2,3,1)
7	(15) Rafał Trojanowski (POZ)	9	(3,Fx,2,2,2)
8	(16) Stanisław Burza (ŁÓD)	8	(1,3,2,0,2)
9	(12) Paweł Miesiąc (RZE/DAU)	8	(1,2,1,2,2)
10	(7) Maciej Piaszczyński (OST)	6	(T/-,1,1,3,1)
11	(6) Tomasz Łukaszewicz (KRO)	6	(2,2,1,1,0)
12	(2) Bartosz Kasprowiak (KRO)	3	(2,X,E4,1,0)
13	(1) Wojciech Druchniak (KRO)	3	(1,0,0,1,1)
14	(19) Piotr Machnik (KRO)	1	(0,0,0,1)
15	(17) Marcin Leś (RZE/RIV)	1	(X,1,0,0)
16	(4) Marcin Rempała (TAR)	1	(0,1,0,-,-)
17	(8) Borys Miturski (CZE)	1	(1,E3,-,-,-)
18	(14) Karol Baran (RYB)	0	(Fx,F/-,-,-,-)
19	(18) Grzegorz Szyszka (KRO)	0	(E3)

=== Opole ===
- Quarter-Final - Opole
- 5 June 2008 (5:00 pm)
- (Poland) Opole
- Referee:
- Attendance: 1,000
- Beat Time: 61.6 secs - Tomasz Jędrzejak in Heat 1
- Qualify to Bydgoszcz's Semi-Final: the top 6 riders + Damian Baliński (LES) and Janusz Kołodziej (TAR) and two track reserves

Pos.	Rider	Points	Details
1	(14) Sebastian Ułamek (CZE)	13	(3,3,1,3,3)
2	(8) Grzegorz Zengota (ZIE)	11	(2,2,3,1,3)
3	(1) Tomasz Jędrzejak (WRO)	11	(3,2,3,2,1)
4	(13) Michał Szczepaniak (CZE)	11	(2,3,3,2,1)
5	(2) Piotr Świderski (RYB)	10	(2,2,X,3,3)
6	(12) Robert Miśkowiak (OST)	10	(2,3,1,1,3)
7	(5) Adam Czechowicz (OPO)	9	(1,1,3,2,2)
8	(11) Krzysztof Buczkowski (BYD)	7	(3,3,0,0,1)
9	(6) Adam Pawliczek (OPO)	6	(0,1,2,3,F)
10	(9) Karol Ząbik (TOR)	6	(0,0,2,2,2)
11	(15) Mateusz Szczepaniak (CZE)	6	(1,2,2,1,0)
12	(16) Tomasz Piszcz (RZE/DAU)	5	(E,E,1,3,1)
13	(10) Marcin Jędrzejewski (BYD)	5	(1,0,1,1,2)
14	(7) Piotr Rembas (OPO)	4	(3,1,0,0,0)
15	(4) Michał Mitko (RYB)	4	(1,1,2,0,0)
16	(3) Patryk Pawlaszczyk (RYB)	2	(0,0,0,E,2)
-	(17) Marcin Piekarski (CZE)	-	-
-	(18) Dariusz Fijałkowski (ŁÓD)	-	-

=== Gniezno ===
- Quarter-Final - Gniezno
- 5 June 2008 (5:00 pm)
- (Poland) Gniezno
- Referee: Piotr Nowak (Toruń)
- Attendance: 2,000
- Beat Time: 63.02 - Jarosław Hampel in Heat 5
- Qualify to Gorzów's Semi-Final: the top 5 riders + Rafał Dobrucki (ZIE), Daniel Jeleniewski (WRO) Krzysztof Kasprzak (LES) and two track reserves

Pos.	Rider	Points	Details
1	(5) Jarosław Hampel (LES)	14	(2,3,3,3,3)
2	(13) Robert Kościecha (TOR)	13	(3,2,3,3,2)
3	(9) Adam Skórnicki (POZ)	12	(2,1,3,3,3)
4	(3) Adrian Gomólski (OST)	10	(3,3,E,1,3)
5	(16) Krzysztof Słaboń (WRO)	10	(2,3,1,2,2)
6	(1) Dawid Cieślewicz (GNI)	8	(2,0,0,3,3)
7	(8) Roman Chromik (RYB)	7+3	(3,2,1,1,0)
8	(11) Daniel Pytel (POZ)	7+T	(0,0,3,2,2)
9	(15) Paweł Staszek (GRU)	7+N	(1,2,0,2,2)
10	(6) Robert Kasprzak (LES)	6	(0,3,2,1,E)
11	(12) Łukasz Jankowski (POZ)	6	(3,1,1,0,1)
12	(7) Paweł Hlib (GOR)	6	(1,1,1,2,1)
13	(14) Mariusz Puszakowski (GRU)	5	(0,2,2,1,E)
14	(10) Grzegorz Kłopot (POZ)	5	(1,1,2,0,1)
15	(2) Mirosław Jabłoński (GNI)	3	(1,0,2,0,0)
16	(4) Marcel Kajzer (RAW)	1	(0,0,E,E,1)
-	(17) Sławomir Musielak (GNI)	-	-

- (R1) Rafał Szombierski (OST) → (R2) S.Musielak

== Semi-finals ==
=== Bydgoszcz ===
- Semi-Final 1
- 3 July 2008 (6:00 pm)
- (Poland) Bydgoszcz, Polonia Stadium
- Referee: Andrzej Terlecki (Gdynia)
- Qualify: 8 + 2R
- Attendance: 1000
- Beat Time: 63.95 secs - Tomasz Gollob in Heat 8

Pos.	Rider	Points	Details
1	(8) Tomasz Gollob (GOR)	14	(3,3,3,3,2)
2	(2) Krzysztof Jabłoński (GDA)	12	(3,3,1,2,3)
3	(11) Sebastian Ułamek (CZE)	12	(3,3,3,1,2)
4	(5) Tomasz Jędrzejak (WRO)	11	(2,0,3,3,3)
5	(7) Adrian Miedziński (TOR)	11	(1,2,3,3,2)
6	(1) Michał Szczepaniak (CZE)	9	(2,1,2,1,3)
7	(9) Sławomir Drabik (TAR)	8	(2,2,1,2,1)
8	(12) Piotr Świderski (RYB)	8	(1,1,2,2,2)
9	(13) Janusz Kołodziej (TAR)	6+3	(3,3,0,0,0)
10	(15) Damian Baliński (LES)	6+2	(1,1,0,3,1)
11	(3) Tomasz Chrzanowski (GDA)	6+1	(1,0,0,2,3)
12	(4) Grzegorz Zengota (ZIE)	5	(0,2,2,0,1)
13	(14) Krystian Klecha (TAR)	4	(2,0,2,0,E)
14	(6) Grzegorz Knapp (RAW)	4	(0,2,E,1,1)
15	(10) Robert Miśkowiak (OST)	3	(0,1,1,1,0)
16	(16) Zbigniew Czerwiński (OST)	1	(0,E,1,0,E)
-	(17) Wiesław Jaguś (TOR)	-	-
-	(18) Adam Czechowicz (OPO)	-	-

=== Gorzów Wlkp. ===
- Semi-Final 2
- 3 July 2008 (6:00 pm)
- (Poland) Gorzów Wielkopolski, Edward Jancarz Stadium
- Referee: Ryszard Bryła (Zielona Góra)
- Qualify: 8 + 2R
- Attendance: 1,700
- Beat Time: 61.46 secs - Rune Holta in Heat 5
- (12) Tomasz Gapiński (CZE) → Rafał Trojanowski

Pos.	Rider	Points	Details
1	(8) Jarosław Hampel (LES)	12	(3,1,3,2,3)
2	(1) Rune Holta (GOR)	12	(2,3,2,3,2)
3	(15) Adrian Gomólski (OST)	11	(3,3,2,3,E)
4	(13) Krzysztof Kasprzak (LES)	11	(X/2x,2,3,3,3)
5	(5) Adam Skórnicki (POZ)	11	(2,1,3,2,3)
6	(11) Piotr Protasiewicz (ZIE)	10	(2,2,3,1,2)
7	(9) Robert Kościecha (TOR)	9	(3,0,2,2,2)
8	(3) Grzegorz Walasek (ZIE)	8	(3,0,E,3,2)
9	(14) Dawid Stachyra (RZE)	6+3	(2,0,1,2,1)
10	(10) Jacek Rempała (TAR)	6+2	(0,2,2,1,1)
11	(7) Daniel Jeleniewski (WRO)	6+1	(0,1,1,1,3)
12	(6) Roman Povazhny (RZE)	5	(1,3,1,X,N)
13	(4) Rafał Dobrucki (ZIE)	4	(1,3,0,F/N,N)
14	(16) Krzysztof Słaboń (WRO)	3	(1,2,E,0,N)
15	(12) Rafał Trojanowski (POZ)	2	(1,0,1,N,N)
16	(2) Maciej Kuciapa (RYB)	1	(0,1,E,N,N)
-	(17) Dawid Cieślewicz (GNI)	-	-

== Final ==
- Final
- 9 August 2008 (7:30)
- (Poland) Leszno, Alfred Smoczyk Stadium
- Referee: Leszek Demski (Ostrów Wlkp.)
- Attendance: 15,000
- Beat Time: 59.64 - Jarosław Hampel in Heat 10
- (4) Adrian Miedziński (TOR) → Janusz Kołodziej
- (16) Piotr Świderski (RYB) → Damian Baliński

Placing	Rider	Total	1	2	3	4	5	6	7	8	9	10	11	12	13	14	15	16	17	18	19	20	Pts	Pos
1	(6) Adam Skórnicki (POZ)	15		3				3			3							3			3		15	1
2	(5) Jarosław Hampel (LES)	13		2			3					3					2					3	13	2
3	(13) Grzegorz Walasek (ZIE)	12				2	2							3		3					2		12	3
4	(14) Tomasz Gollob (GOR)	11				3		2					1		3							2	11	4
5	(16) Damian Baliński (LES)	9				X				3	2						3			1			9	5
6	(2) Krzysztof Kasprzak (LES)	8	3					1				1				1				2			8	6
7	(8) Piotr Protasiewicz (ZIE)	7		0						1			3			2			1				7	7
8	(15) Robert Kościecha (TOR)	7				E			1			2						2	2				7	8
9	(1) Tomasz Jędrzejak (WRO)	6	0				0				1				2				3				6	9
10	(3) Sebastian Ułamek (CZE)	6	2						F				2				1				1		6	10
11	(4) Janusz Kołodziej (TAR)	6	1							2				2				X				1	6	11
12	(9) Rune Holta (GOR)	4			3		1						0					F/-		-			4	12
13	(R1) Dawid Stachyra (RZE)	4																1		3			4	13
14	(11) Adrian Gomólski (OST)	3			0				3		0					0						0	3	14
15	(10) Michał Szczepaniak (CZE)	3			2			0						1			0		0				3	15
16	(7) Sławomir Drabik (CZE)	3		1					2					0	E					M/-			3	16
17	(12) Krzysztof Jabłoński (GDA)	2			1					0		0			1						0		2	17
18	(R3) Jacek Rempała (TAR)	0																		0			0	18
	(R2) Tomasz Chrzanowski (GDA)	0																					0	
Placing	Rider	Total	1	2	3	4	5	6	7	8	9	10	11	12	13	14	15	16	17	18	19	20	Pts	Pos

m - exclusion for exceeding two minute time allowance • t - exclusion for touching the tapes • x - other exclusion • e - retired or mechanical failure • f - fell • ns - non-starter • nc - non-classify

gate A - inside	gate B	gate C	gate D - outside

== See also ==
- 2008 Team Speedway Polish Championship (2008 Speedway Ekstraliga)
