= 2010 Individual Speedway Polish Championship =

Motorcycle racing competition

The 2010 Individual Speedway Polish Championship (Polish: Indywidualne Mistrzostwa Polski, IMP) was the 2010 version of Individual Speedway Polish Championship organized by the Polish Motor Union (PZM). The Championship was won by Janusz Kołodziej, who beat Krzysztof Kasprzak in the Run-off. Third was Rafał Dobrucki. Kołodziej, who won 2009 (host in 2010), 2010 Golden Helmet and 2010 Speedway World Cup was award nomination to the 2011 Speedway Grand Prix. The defending Champion, Tomasz Gollob, who was a 2010 Speedway Grand Prix leader, resigned from the IMP Final.

== Format ==
In four quarter-finals was started 64 riders and to semi-finals was qualify 27 riders (top 6 from Lublin' QR and top 7 from Opole, Piła and Poznań meetings. This 27 riders and 5 seeded was started in two semi-finals. This five riders was Grand Prix permanent riders (Tomasz Gollob, Rune Holta and Jarosław Hampel) and top 3 from 2009 Polish Championship Final (Gollob, Krzysztof Kasprzak and Janusz Kołodziej). The top 8 riders from both SF was qualify for the final in Zielona Góra. The hosting of the final is traditionally awarded to the defending Team Polish Champion, Falubaz Zielona Góra.

== Quarter-finals ==
=== Lublin ===
- 27 May 2010
- (Poland) Lublin
- Referee: Piotr Lis (Lublin)
- Beat Time: 66.95 – Maciej Kuciapa in Heat 10
- Attendance: 500
- References

Pos.	Rider	Points	Details
1	(12) Maciej Kuciapa, RZE	14	(3,2,3,3,3)
2	(3) Mariusz Puszakowski, LUB	12	(3,3,1,3,2)
3	(6) Wiesław Jaguś, TOR	11	(3,2,3,3,M/-)
4	(8) Mateusz Szczepaniak, POZ	11	(2,3,2,1,3)
5	(11) Robert Kościecha, BYD	11	(1,2,2,3,3)
6	(14) Krzysztof Jabłoński, GNI	11	(3,1,3,2,2)
7	(2) Daniel Jeleniewski, WRO	10	(T/-,3,2,2,3)
8	(16) Michał Szczepaniak, GNI	7	(2,0,1,2,2)
9	(15) Krzysztof Słaboń, CZE	6	(1,1,0,2,2)
10	(5) Rafał Trojanowski, POZ	6	(1,2,1,1,1)
11	(9) Paweł Staszek, KRO	5	(2,3,0,R4,0)
12	(10) Paweł Miesiąc, DAU	4	(0,R4,3,R4,1)
13	(4) Marcin Rempała, TAR	4	(2,1,0,1,-)
14	(13) Borys Miturski, CZE	3	(0,0,2,0,1)
15	(7) Roman Chromik, KRA	3	(0,0,1,1,1)
16	(1) Karol Baran, LUB	2	(1,1,0,-,-)
17	(18) Grzegorz Stróżyk, KRA	0	(0,0,0)
18	(17) Mateusz Kowalczyk, ŁÓD	0	(R,R4)

=== Piła ===
- 27 May 2010
- (Poland) Piła
- Referee:
- References
- Changes:

Draw 1. Andrzej Korolew, PIŁ → Reserve 17. Celmer
Draw 6. Artur Mroczka, GRU → Reserve 18. Kajoch
Draw 15. Piotr Świst, PIŁ → Pecyna
Draw 19. Grzegorz Knapp, KRO → Dziatkowiak and Pakiet

Pos.	Rider	Points	Details
1	(12) Rafał Dobrucki, ZIE	14	(2,3,3,3,3)
2	(8) Tomasz Chrzanowski, GRU	14	(3,2,3,3,3)
3	(10) Piotr Protasiewicz, ZIE	12	(3,3,3,3,M/-)
4	(3) Sławomir Drabik, CZE	11	(2,3,2,2,2)
5	(1) Damian Celmer, POZ	10	(1,3,3,2,1)
6	(2) Grzegorz Walasek, BYD	10	(3,2,2,1,2)
7	(15) Krzysztof Pecyna, PIŁ	9	(2,2,1,2,2)
8	(11) Krzysztof Buczkowski, GRU	8+3	(M/-,1,2,2,3)
9	(4) Norbert Kościuch, POZ	8+N	(0,1,2,3,2)
10	(14) Krystian Klecha, OST	6	(3,1,1,R4,1)
11	(16) Mariusz Staszewski, OST	5	(1,0,R4,1,3)
12	(7) Sławomir Musielak, LES	4	(1,0,1,1,1)
13	(13) Damian Sperz, GDA	3	(0,2,0,R4,1)
14	(5) Tobiasz Musielak, RAW	2	(2,R2,0,0,0)
15	(6) Adam Kajoch, OST	2	(0,0,1,1,0)
16	(9) Sławomir Pyszny, RYB	1	(0,1,0)
17	(17) Piotr Dziatkowiak, PIŁ	1	(1,0)
18	(18) Artur Pakiet, PIŁ	0	(0,0)

=== Opole ===
- 27 May 2010
- (Poland) Opole
- Referee: Wojciech Grodzki (Opole)
- Beat Time: 61.5 – Sebastian Ułamek in Heat 2
- Attendance: 500
- References
- Changes:

Draw 12. Piotr Świderski, WRO → Resereve 17. Mitko
Draw 13. Maciej Janowski, WRO → K.Fleger
Draw 18. Patryk Pawlaszczyk, KRA → None
Draw 19. Bartosz Szymura, KRA → None

Pos.	Rider	Points	Details
1	(7) Sebastian Ułamek, TAR	15	(3,3,3,3,3)
2	(5) Patryk Dudek, ZIE	12	(1,2,3,3,3)
3	(9) Ronnie Jamroży, RYB	9	(1,3,0,3,2)
4	(6) Tomasz Jędrzejak, TAR	9	(2,0,3,1,3)
5	(8) Piotr Dym, ŁÓD	9	(0,2,3,2,2)
6	(2) Dawid Lampart, RZE	8+3	(3,1,R4,3,1)
7	(15) Jacek Rempała, ŁÓD	8+2	(2,T,1,2,3)
8	(3) Szymon Kiełbasa, TAR	8+1	(2,1,2,2,1)
9	(14) Rafał Fleger, RYB	7	(3,1,1,R3,2)
10	(4) Adrian Szewczykowski, POZ	7	(1,3,2,0,1)
11	(11) Mariusz Węgrzyk, RYB	7	(2,2,0,1,2)
12	(12) Michał Mitko, OPO	6	(3,0,2,1,0)
13	(16) Tomasz Rempała, LUB	5	(1,1,2,1,0)
14	(1) Adam Pawliczek, OPO	4	(0,0,1,2,1)
15	(10) Kamil Fleger, RYB	3	(0,3,0,0,0)
16	(13) Rafał Fleger, RYB	3	(0,2,1,T,0)

=== Poznań ===
- 27 May 2010
- (Poland) Poznań
- Referee:
- References
- Change:

Draw 2. Kamil Cieślar, CZE → Reserve 18. Jankowski
Draw 5. Rafał Okoniewski, RZE → K.Gomólski
Draw 8. Zbigniew Czerwiński, OST → None
Draw 16. Roman Povazhny, DAU → None
Draw 17. Piotr Rembas, PIŁ → None

Pos.	Rider	Points	Details
1	(15) Adrian Miedziński, TOR	15	(3,3,3,3,3)
2	(9) Damian Baliński, LES	14	(3,3,3,2,3)
3	(11) Paweł Hlib, GDA	12	(1,2,3,3,3)
4	(1) Robert Miśkowiak, POZ	11	(3,1,2,3,2)
5	(13) Grzegorz Zengota, ZIE	11	(2,2,3,2,2)
6	(3) Tomasz Gapiński, GOR	10	(2,1,1,3,3)
7	(10) Dawid Stachyra, GDA	9	(2,3,1,2,1)
8	(6) Adrian Gomólski, GNI	8	(3,2,1,1,1)
9	(14) Daniel Pytel, OST		(1,1,2,2,0)
10	(4) Adam Skórnicki, POZ		(1,2,2,T,1)
11	(12) Stanisław Burza, ŁÓD		(0,3,1,1,M)
12	(2) Łukasz Jankowski, ŁÓD		(R4,R4,2,1,2)
13	(5) Kacper Gomólski, GNI		(2,0,0,X,2)
14	(7) Marcin Jędrzejewski, ŁÓD		(1,0,R4,0,1)

== Semi-finals ==
=== Łódź ===
- 15 July 2010
- (Poland) Łódź
- Referee: Jerzy Najwer
- References
- Changes:

Draw 2. Wiesław Jaguś, TOR → 17. Jeleniewski
Draw 5. Patryk Dudek, ZIE → 18. Kiełbasa
Draw 14. Rune Holta, CZE → Mi.Szczepaniak

Pos.	Rider	Points	Details
1	(13) Krzysztof Kasprzak, TAR	14	(3,2,3,3,3)
2	(11) Sebastian Ułamek, TAR	12	(3,3,2,1,3)
3	(9) Krzysztof Jabłoński, GNI	12	(2,3,1,3,3)
4	(6) Robert Kościecha, BYD	11	(3,1,3,2,2)
5	(8) Jarosław Hampel, LES	11	(1,2,3,2,3)
6	(16) Maciej Kuciapa, RZE	10	(2,3,1,3,1)
7	(14) Michał Szczepaniak, GNI	9	(1,2,2,3,1)
8	(7) Mateusz Szczepaniak, POZ	8+3	(2,2,1,1,2)
9	(2) Daniel Jeleniewski, WRO	8+2	(3,3,2,0,0)
10	(12) Piotr Dym, ŁÓD	8+1	(1,1,3,2,1)
11	(3) Mariusz Puszakowski, LUB	5	(2,1,0,2,R)
12	(4) Tomasz Jędrzejak, TAR	5	(0,0,2,1,2)
13	(1) Ronnie Jamroży, RYB	4	(1,1,0,R,2)
14	(5) Szymon Kiełbasa, TAR	2	(0,0,1,1,0)
15	(15) Jacek Rempała, ŁÓD	0	(0,0,T,0,N)
16	(10) Dawid Lampart, RZE	0	(R,M,N,N,N)

=== Krosno ===
- 15 July 2010
- (Poland) Krosno
- Referee: Artur Kuśmierz
- References
- Change:

Draw 5. Paweł Hlib, GDA → 17. Buczkowski

Pos.	Rider	Points	Details
1	(1) Tomasz Gollob, GOR	15	(3,3,3,3,3)
2	(8) Adrian Miedziński, TOR	12	(3,2,3,2,2)
3	(14) Piotr Protasiewicz, ZIE	11	(3,3,1,1,3)
4	(4) Janusz Kołodziej, LES	9	(R,3,3,3,0)
5	(13) Tomasz Gapiński, GOR	9	(2,0,1,3,3)
6	(17) Krzysztof Buczkowski, GRU	9	(1,1,3,3,1)
7	(7) Dawid Stachyra, GDA	9	(2,1,2,2,2)
8	(9) Damian Baliński, LES	9	(2,2,2,2,1)
9	(11) Rafał Dobrucki, ZIE	8	(3,2,1,0,2)
10	(2) Grzegorz Walasek, BYD	8	(2,1,1,1,3)
11	(16) Grzegorz Zengota, ZIE	6	(1,1,2,2,0)
12	(15) Robert Miśkowiak, POZ	4	(0,3,R,0,1)
13	(12) Tomasz Chrzanowski, GRU	4	(1,0,2,0,1)
14	(10) Damian Celmer, POZ	3	(0,2,0,1,0)
15	(6) Sławomir Drabik, CZE	3	(0,R,0,1,2)
16	(3) Krzysztof Pecyna, PIŁ	1	(1,F,0,0,X)
—	(18) Adrian Gomólski, GNI	—	—

== The final ==
- ~~7 August 2010~~ 18 September 2010
- (Poland) Zielona Góra
- Referee:
- References
- Change:

Draw 5. Tomasz Gollob, GOR → 18. Dobrucki
Draw 18. Rafał Dobrucki, ZIE → Zengota

Placing	Rider	Total	1	2	3	4	5	6	7	8	9	10	11	12	13	14	15	16	17	18	19	20	Pts	Pos	21
1	(2) Janusz Kołodziej (LES)	13	2					3				3				3				2			13	1	3
2	(14) Krzysztof Kasprzak (TAR)	13				3		2					3		3							2	13	2	2
3	(5) Rafał Dobrucki (ZIE)	11		3			0					2					3					3	11	3	
4	(9) Adrian Miedziński (TOR)	9			0		3						1					2		3			9	4	
5	(4) Jarosław Hampel (LES)	8	1							1				3				3				0	8	5	
6	(10) Maciej Kuciapa (RZE)	8			1			1						2			1		3				8	6	
7	(12) Sebastian Ułamek (TAR)	7			3					3		1			F						0		7	7	
8	(1) Robert Kościecha (BYD)	7	3				1				0				1				2				7	8	
9	(11) Piotr Protasiewicz (ZIE)	7			2				0		2					2						1	7	9	
10	(7) Mateusz Szczepaniak (POZ)	7		1					2					1	2					1			7	10	
11	(18) Grzegorz Zengota (ZIE)	6									3										3		6	11	
12	(16) Michał Szczepaniak (GNI)	6				1				2	1						2			0			6	12	
13	(8) Krzysztof Buczkowski (GRU)	6		2						0			2			1			1				6	13	
14	(3) Krzysztof Jabłoński (GNI)	5	0						3				0				0				2		5	14	
15	(13) Damian Baliński (LES)	5				2	2							0		0					1		5	15	
16	(15) Dawid Stachyra (GDA)	2				0			1			0						1	R				2	16	
17	(17) Daniel Jeleniewski (WRO)	0						0										0					0	17	
18	(6) Tomasz Gapiński (GOR)	0		X				-			-							-			-		0	18	
Placing	Rider	Total	1	2	3	4	5	6	7	8	9	10	11	12	13	14	15	16	17	18	19	20	Pts	Pos	21

m - exclusion for exceeding two minute time allowance • t - exclusion for touching the tapes • x - other exclusion • e - retired or mechanical failure • f - fell • ns - non-starter • nc - non-classify

gate A - inside	gate B	gate C	gate D - outside

== Key ==
- BYD – Polonia Bydgoszcz
- CZE – Włókniarz Częstochowa
- DAU – SK Lokomotive Daugavpils
- GDA – Lotos Wybrzeże Gdańsk
- GNI – Start Gniezno
- GOR – Caelum Stal Gorzów
- GRU – GTŻ Grudziądz
- KRA – Speedway Wanda Kraków
- KRO – KSM Krosno
- LES – Unia Leszno
- LUB – Lubelski Węgiel KMŻ
- ŁÓD – Orzeł Łódź
- OPO – KŻ Kolejarz Opole
- OST – ŻKS Ostrovia Ostrów
- PIŁ – Speedway-Polonia Piła
- POZ – PSŻ Lechma Poznań
- RAW – RKS Kolejarz Rawicz
- RYB – RKM ROW Rybnik
- RZE – Marma Hadykówka Rzeszów
- TAR – Tauron Azoty Tarnów
- TOR – Unibax Toruń
- WRO – Betard WTS Wrocław
- ZIE – Falubaz Zielona Góra
