= 2010 Polish speedway season =

Motorcycle racing competition

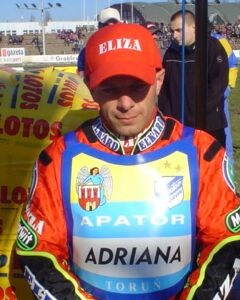
- Wiesław Jaguś won the Pairs championship for Toruń

The 2010 Polish Speedway season was the 2010 season of motorcycle speedway in Poland.

== Individual ==
=== Golden Helmet ===
The 1999 Golden Golden Helmet (Polish: Turniej o Złoty Kask, ZK) organised by the Polish Motor Union (PZM) was the 2010 event for the league's leading riders. The final was held at Częstochowa on the 16 September.

Pos.	Rider	Club	Total	Points
1	Janusz Kołodziej	Unia Leszno	13	(1,3,3,3,3)
2	Adrian Miedziński	KS Toruń	12	(3,2,3,3,1)
3	Piotr Protasiewicz	Falubaz Zielona Góra	11 +3	(0,2,3,3,3)
4	Damian Baliński	Unia Leszno	11 +2	(2,3,2,3,1)
5	Krzysztof Kasprzak	Unia Tarnów	10 +3	(3,0,2,2,3)
6	Sebastian Ułamek	Unia Tarnów	10 +2	(3,3,0,1,3)
7	Wiesław Jaguś	KS Toruń	10 +1	(2,1,3,2,2)
8	Tomasz Gapiński	Stal Gorzów Wlkp.	9	(2,2,2,1,2)
9	Piotr Świderski	WTS Wrocław	8	(2,3,1,0,2)
10	Dawid Stachyra	Wybrzeże Gdańsk	7	(3,d,1,2,1)
11	Ronnie Jamroży	RKM Rybnik	5	(1,2,0,0,2)
12	Maciej Janowski	WTS Wrocław	4	(0,1,1,2,0)
13	Tomasz Jędrzejak	Unia Tarnów	4	(1,1,0,1,1)
14	Daniel Jeleniewski	WTS Wrocław	3	(0,1,1,1,d)
15	Sławomir Drabik	Włókniarz Częstochowa	2	(0,d,2,0,0)
16	Robert Miśkowiak	PSŻ Poznań	1	(1,0,0,–,–)
17	Grzegorz Zengota (res)	Falubaz Zielona Góra	0	(0,0)

=== Criterium of Aces ===
The Mieczysław Połukard Criterium of Aces was won by Emil Saifutdinov.

=== Junior Championship ===
- winner - Maciej Janowski

=== Silver Helmet ===
- winner - Maciej Janowski

=== Bronze Helmet ===
- winner - Patryk Dudek

== Pairs ==
=== Polish Pairs Speedway Championship ===
The 2010 Polish Pairs Speedway Championship was the 2010 edition of the Polish Pairs Speedway Championship, organised by the Polish Motor Union (PZM).

Final (3 June, MotoArena Toruń)

Pos	Team	Pts	Riders
1	Unibax Toruń	23	Wiesław Jaguś 13, Adrian Miedziński 10
2	Stal Rzeszów	20+3	Rafał Okoniewski 15+3, Maciej Kuciapa 5
3	Polonia Bydgoszcz	20+2	Grzegorz Walasek 10+2, Robert Kościecha10
4	Unia Leszno	19	Janusz Kołodziej 11, Damian Baliński 8
5	Unia Tarnów	18	Krzysztof Kasprzak 12, Sebastian Ułamek 6
6	WTS Wrocław	18	Daniel Jeleniewski 10, Maciej Janowski 8
7	Start Gniezno	8	Krzysztof Jabłoński 5, Mirosław Jabłoński 3, Marcin Wawrzyniak 0

== Team ==
=== Team Speedway Polish Championship ===
The 2010 Team Speedway Polish Championship was the 2010 edition of the Team Polish Championship. Unia Leszno won the gold medal.

==== Ekstraliga ====
Pos	Team	P	W	D	L	Pts	BP	Total	Diff
1	Unia Leszno	14	12	0	2	24	7	31	267
2	Stal Gorzów Wielkopolski	14	11	1	2	23	5	28	116
3	Unibax Toruń	14	8	0	6	16	3	19	11
4	WTS Sparta Wrocław	14	6	1	7	13	4	17	-23
5	Falubaz Zielona Góra	14	7	0	7	14	3	17	21
6	Unia Tarnów	14	5	0	9	10	2	12	-110
7	Polonia Bydgoszcz	14	3	0	11	6	2	8	-115
8	Włókniarz Częstochowa	14	3	0	11	6	0	6	-167

Play offs

Team	Team	Team	Score
quarter final	Zielona Góra	Stal Gorzów	47–43, 46–43
quarter final	Wrocław	Toruń	52–38, 35–55
quarter final	Tarnów	Leszno	46–44, 38–52
semi final	Toruń	Leszno	46–44, 31–59
semi final	Zielona Góra	Wrocław	46–38, 45-45
final	Zielona Góra	Leszno	39–51, 27–39

==== 1.Liga ====
Pos	Team	P	W	D	L	Diff	Pts	BP	Total
1	Stal Rzeszów	14	10	0	4	201	20	6	26
2	Lokomotiv Daugavpils (Latvia)	14	9	0	5	198	18	6	24
3	Wybrzeże Gdańsk	14	9	0	5	83	18	5	23
4	Start Gniezno	14	9	0	5	85	18	4	22
5	GTŻ Grudziądz	14	8	0	6	41	16	3	19
6	PSŻ Poznań	14	7	0	7	–8	14	3	17
7	RKM ROW Rybnik	14	3	0	11	–167	6	1	7
8	Speedway Miskolc (Hungary)	14	1	0	13	–433	2	0	2

Play offs

Pos	Team	Pts
1	Rzeszów	20
2	Gdańsk	14
3	Gniezno	13
4	Daugavpils	13

Pos	Team	Pts
5	Grudziądz	25
6	Poznań	18
7	Rybnik	16
8	Miskolc	2

==== 2.Liga ====
Pos	Team	P	W	D	L	Diff	Pts	BP	Total
1	Orzeł Łódź	14	11	1	2	300	23	7	30
2	KMŻ Lublin	14	10	0	4	176	20	6	26
3	Ostrów Wlkp.	14	7	1	6	60	15	6	21
4	Kolejarz Rawicz	14	7	0	7	-42	14	3	17
5	Polonia Piła	14	6	0	8	-79	12	2	14
6	Kolejarz Opole	14	5	1	8	-141	11	3	13
7	KSM Krosno	14	5	0	9	-121	10	2	12
8	Wanda Kraków	14	3	1	10	-153	7	2	9

Play offs

Pos	Team	Pts
1	Łódź	24
2	Lublin	22
3	Ostrów	9
4	Rawicz	5
