= 2007 Individual Speedway European Championship =

Motorcycle sport competition

Seasons
- ← 2006 2008 →

The 2007 Individual Speedway European Championship was a speedway competition consisting of three qualifying rounds, three semi-final rounds, and a final round. The final, held on 29 September in Wiener Neustadt, was won by Jurica Pavlic of Croatia.

== Final standing ==
1. (gold) Jurica Pavlic (Croatia)
2. (silver) Sebastian Ułamek (Poland)
3. (bronze) Patrick Hougaard (Denmark)

== Calendar ==
Race format
Gate	A (inside)	B	C	D (outside)
Heat No	Riders starting No
1	1	2	3	4
2	5	7	6	8
3	10	11	9	12
4	15	14	16	13
5	13	1	5	9
6	14	10	2	6
7	11	15	7	3
8	4	8	12	16
9	6	16	1	11
10	12	5	15	2
11	8	9	3	14
12	13	4	10	7
13	7	12	14	1
14	2	13	8	11
15	16	3	10	5
16	9	6	4	15
17	1	8	15	10
18	9	2	7	16
19	3	12	13	6
20	5	14	11	4

Day	Venue	Winner	
Domestic Qualifications
19 April	(Poland) Tarnów	(Poland) Maciej Kuciapa	result
Qualifying Rounds
1 May	(Germany) Stralsund	(Poland) Karol Ząbik	result
20 May	(Ukraine) Lviv	(Poland) Zbigniew Suchecki	result
31 May	(Russia) Tolyatti	(Russia) Denis Gizatullin	result
Semi-Finals
17 June	(Netherlands) Blijham	(Poland) Zbigniew Suchecki	result
5 August	(Denmark) Esbjerg	(Denmark) Henrik Møller	result
18 August	(Croatia) Goričan	(Poland) Sebastian Ułamek	result
Final
29 September	(Austria) Wiener Neustadt	(Croatia) Jurica Pavlič	result

== Domestic qualifications ==
=== Poland ===
- Domestic Qualification for Individual Speedway European Championship - Final
- April 19, 2007
- (Poland) Tarnów
- Referee: Piotr Lis (Lublin)
- Attendance: 500
- Best Time: 69.10 - Karol Ząbik in 2nd heat
- Changes:
  - (4) Łukasz Jankowski (injury) → Rafał Okoniewski
  - (12) Sebastian Ułamek (injury) → Daniel Jeleniewski
  - (14) Łukasz Linette (unknown reason) → Sebastian Trumiński

Pos.	Rider	Points	Heats
1	(2) Maciej Kuciapa	14	(3,3,3,2,3)
2	(12) Daniel Jeleniewski	13	(3,3,1,3,3)
3	(5) Karol Ząbik	13	(3,3,2,3,2)
4	(7) Mariusz Staszewski	11	(2,2,3,2,2)
5	(11) Sławomir Drabik	10	(1,e,3,3,3)
6	(10) Zbigniew Suchecki	10	(2,2,1,2,3)
7	(15) Jacek Rempała	9	(3,3,0,3,0)
8	(8) Krystian Klecha	7+3	(1,2,2,f,2)
9	(13) Andrzej Huszcza	7+2	(2,1,2,1,1)
10	(9) Grzegorz Walasek	7+N	(e,2,3,2,e)
11	(3) Paweł Miesiąc	6	(2,1,f/x,1,2)
12	(14) Sebastian Trumiński	5	(1,1,1,1,1)
13	(16) Tomasz Rempała	4	(0,1,2,e,1)
14	(1) Ronnie Jamroży	3	(1,0,1,0,1)
15	(6) Robert Kościecha	1	(0,d,0,1,e)
16	(17) Kamil Zieliński	0	(e,0,0)
17	(4) Rafał Okoniewski	0	(t,e,e,t,-)
	(18) Robert Wardzała	-	-
Gates in 21st: A - Huszcza, B - Klecha, C - Walasek (17) Zieliński - heats: 1, 16 and 20
Heat Times: 1-7: 69.56 - 69.10 - 70.02 - 71.32 - 69.14 - 71.05 - 71.37; 8-14: 73.81 - 71.40 - 71.09 - 71.13 - 71.46 - 71.35 - 71.16; 15-21: 70.86 - 71.46 - 71.40 - 72.20 - 72.47 - 70.82 - 72.64

== Qualifying rounds ==
=== Stralsund ===
- Qualifying Round 1
- May 1, 2007
- (Germany) Stralsund
- Referee: (Hungary) Istvan Darago
- Attendance: ?
- Best Time: ?

Pos.	Rider	Points	Heats
1	(Poland) (15) Karol Ząbik	13+3	(3,3,3,1,3)
2	(Czech Republic) (12) Lukáš Dryml	13+2	(3,2,2,3,3)
3	(Slovenia) (10) Matej Ferjan	13+1	(2,3,3,3,2)
4	(Germany) (1) Christian Hefenbrock	11	(3,3,3,1,1)
5	(Poland) (4) Sławomir Drabik	11	(1,3,2,2,3)
6	(Germany) (7) Mathias Schultz	11	(3,2,1,2,3)
7	(Germany) (9) Tobias Kroner	9	(0,2,2,3,2)
8	(Czech Republic) (3) Zdeněk Simota	8	(2,0,3,2,1)
9	(Austria) (8) Fritz Wallner	7	(2,1,1,3,0)
10	(Poland) (6) Mariusz Staszewski	7	(1,2,2,0,2)
11	(Slovenia) (14) Jernej Kolenko	5	(2,1,x,0,2)
12	(Italy) (16) Mattia Carpanese	4	(1,0,1,1,1)
13	(Slovenia) (11) Izak Šantej	4	(1,1,0,1,1)
14	(Germany) (2) René Schäfer	2	(0,0,0,2,0)
15	(Latvia) (5) Leonīds Paura	2	(0,1,1,0,0)
16	(Netherlands) (13) Henk Bos	0	(0,0,0,0,0)

=== Tolyatti ===
- Qualifying Round 3
- May 31, 2007
- (Russia) Tolyatti
- Referee: (Czech Republic) Pavel Vana
- Attendance: ?
- Best Time: ?

Pos.	Rider	Points	Heats
1	(Russia) (5) Denis Gizatullin	15	(3,3,3,3,3)
2	(Russia) (13) Denis Saifutdinov	12	(3,2,2,3,2)
3	(Poland) (10) Daniel Jeleniewski	11	(3,3,3,2,u/w)
4	(Russia) (1) Marat Gatiatov	11	(2,1,3,3,2)
5	(Russia) (8) Roman Ivanov	10	(2,d,3,2,3)
6	(Russia) (3) Vladimir Dubinin	10	(3,1,2,1,3)
7	(Czech Republic) (15) Luboš Tomíček, Jr.	8	(2,2,2,1,1)
8	(Russia) (11) Ruslan Gatiatov	7	(2,3,1,0,1)
9	(Russia) (2) Georgij Iszutin	7	(1,1,1,1,3)
10	(Russia) (14) Ilia Bondarenko	7	(1,2,0,2,2)
11	(Russia) (9) Vasilij Szibankov	6	(0,u/w,1,3,2)
12	(Russia) (12) Jewgienij Gomozov	5	(1,3,0,1,0)
13	(Czech Republic) (6) Josef Franc	5	(0,d,2,2,1)
14	(Russia) (4) Lenar Nigmatzanov	3	(0,2,1,0,-)
15	(Russia) (7) Jewgienij Sidorin	2	(1,0,0,0,1)
16	(Austria) (16) Henrich Schatzer	1	(0,1,0,0,0)
17	(Russia) (17) Oleg Biezczastnov	0	(u/w)
(17) Biezczastnov - heat: 20

=== Lviv ===
- Qualifying Round 2
- May 20, 2007
- (Ukraine) Lviv
- Referee: (Poland) Wojciech Grodzki
- Attendance: ?
- Best Time: ?

Pos.	Rider	Points	Heats
1	(Poland) (2) Zbigniew Suchecki	15	(3,3,3,3,3)
2	(Russia) (10) Renat Gafurov	14	(3,2,3,3,3)
3	(Poland) (14) Sebastian Ułamek	13	(3,1,3,3,3)
4	(Russia) (6) Sergey Darkin	11	(2,e,3,3,3)
5	(Hungary) (7) Jozsef Tabaka	9	(3,3,1,0,2)
6	(Ukraine) (1) Andriy Karpov	9	(2,3,x,2,2)
7	(Czech Republic) (12) Aleš Dryml, Jr.	9	(2,3,2,1,1)
8	(Italy) (4) Guglielmo Franchetti	9	(1,2,2,2,2)
9	(Germany) (9) Ronny Weis	7	(1,2,2,1,1)
10	(Ukraine) (13) Yaroslav Polyuhovich	6+3	(1,1,f,2,2)
11	(Czech Republic) (15) Tomáš Suchánek	6+2	(2,2,1,0,1)
12	(Romania) (11) Alexandru Toma	3+3	(1,1,0,1,0)
13	(Croatia) (3) Marko Vlah	3+N	(e,1,1,1,0)
14	(Ukraine) (5) Andriy Kobrin	2	(0,0,0,2,e)
15	(Ukraine) (17) Volodymyr Marchuk	2	(0,2,0,e)
16	(Romania) (8) Fenica Popa	1	(t/-,0,f,0,1)
17	(Slovakia) (16) Ratislaw Bandzi	0	(x,e,-,-,-)
(17) Marczuk - heats: 3, 9, 15 and 18

== Semi-finals ==
=== Blijham ===
- Semi-Final A
- June 17, 2007
- (Netherlands) Blijham
- Referee: (Poland) Wojciech Grodzki
- Attendance: ?
- Best Time: ?

Pos.	Rider	Points	Heats
1	(Poland) (11) Zbigniew Suchecki	12+3	(3,3,3,1,2)
2	(Czech Republic) (5) Tomáš Suchánek	12+2	(3,3,3,2,1)
3	(Poland) (14) Sławomir Drabik	12+1	(2,3,1,3,3)
4	(Russia) (16) Denis Gizatullin	10+3	(3,w,2,3,2)
5	(Slovenia) (9) Matej Ferjan	10+2	(d,2,2,3,3)
6	(Poland) (13) Mariusz Staszewski	10+1	(1,1,3,2,3)
7	(Poland) (8) Daniel Jeleniewski	9	(1,2,w,3,3)
8	(Russia) (1) Roman Ivanov	8	(3,0,1,2,2)
9	(Germany) (10) Tobias Kroner	8	(2,2,2,1,1)
10	(Russia) (15) Denis Saifutdinov	6	(0,2,2,2,d)
11	(Russia) (3) Renat Gafurov	5	(2,d,3,u,-)
12	(Netherlands) (4) Jannick de Jong	5	(0,3,1,1,0)
13	(Slovenia) (7) Jernej Kolenko	4	(2,1,d,1,0)
14	(Italy) (2) Guglielmo Franchetti	4	(1,1,1,0,1)
15	(Austria) (12) Fritz Wallner	1	(1,d,d,d,-)

=== Goričan ===
- Semi-Final C
- August 18, 2007
- (Croatia) Goričan
- Referee: (Poland) Marek Wojaczek
- Attendance: ?
- Best Time: ?

Pos.	Rider	Points	Heats
1	(Poland) (14) Sebastian Ułamek	14	(3,2,3,3,3)
2	(Croatia) (2) Jurica Pavlič	13	(2,3,3,2,3)
3	(Czech Republic) (13) Lukáš Dryml	12	(t,3,3,3,3)
4	(Germany) (15) Christian Hefenbrock	11	(0,3,2,3,3)
5	(Czech Republic) (8) Aleš Dryml, Jr.	10	(3,3,2,0,2)
6	(Czech Republic) (3) Luboš Tomíček, Jr.	9	(3,1,0,3,2)
7	(Hungary) (16) Jozsef Tabaka	9	(2,2,3,1,1)
8	(Czech Republic) (7) Zdeněk Simota	9	(1,2,2,2,2)
9	(Russia) (9) Władimir Dubinin	7	(2,2,1,2,0)
10	(Germany) (5) Mathias Schultz	7	(2,1,1,2,1)
11	(Russia) (11) Ilia Bondarenko	6	(1,0,2,1,2)
12	(Russia) (10) Marat Gatiatow	5	(3,1,w,0,1)
13	(Croatia) (4) Marko Vlah	3	(0,1,1,1,0)
14	(Austria) (12) Heinrich Schatzer	2	(0,0,0,1,1)
15	(Russia) (1) Rusłan Gatiatow	2	(1,0,1,0,0)
16	(Croatia) (17) Nikola Pigac	1	(1)
17	(Germany) (6) Ronny Weis	0	(0,0,0,0,0)
(17) Pigac - heat: 4

=== Esbjerg ===
- Semi-Final B
- August 5, 2007
- (Denmark) Esbjerg
- Referee: (Sweden) Krister Gardell
- Attendance: ?
- Best Time: ?

Pos.	Rider	Points	Heats
1	(Denmark) (5) Henrik Møller	14	(2,3,3,3,3)
2	(Sweden) (15) Sebastian Aldén	12+3	(2,3,1,3,3)
3	(Denmark) (7) Nicolai Klindt	12+2	(3,0,3,3,3)
4	(Denmark) (11) Kenneth Hansen	12+1	(3,2,3,2,2)
5	(Denmark) (16) Henning Bager	12+0	(3,3,2,2,2)
6	(Denmark) (3) Mads Korneliussen	11	(3,1,3,1,3)
7	(Denmark) (2) Patrick Hougaard	10	(2,3,2,3,d)
8	(Sweden) (4) Erik Andersson	8	(1,2,2,2,1)
9	(Denmark) (9) Leon Madsen	7	(1,2,2,1,1)
10	(Sweden) (14) Viktor Bergström	5	(d,2,1,2,0)
11	(Finland) (13) Jari Makinen	5	(1,0,1,1,2)
12	(Norway) (6) Carl Johan Raugstad	4	(1,1,1,0,1)
13	(Sweden) (10) Tobias Johansson	3	(2,0,0,0,1)
14	(Sweden) (8) Daniel Davidsson	2	(0,0,0,0,2)
15	(Norway) (12) Rune Sola	2	(0,1,0,1,0)
16	(Finland) (1) Tero Aarnio	1	(d,1,d,0,0)
-	(Denmark) (17) Johannes Kikkekborg	-	-

== Final ==
- September 29, 2007
- (Austria) Wiener Neustadt
- Manuel Hauzinger was nominated as Austrian rider.
- Changes (in order):
  - (5) Sławomir Drabik (Poland) → Mariusz Staszewski (Poland)
  - (1) Henning Bager (Denmark) → Patrick Hougaard (Denmark)

Placing	Rider	Total	1	2	3	4	5	6	7	8	9	10	11	12	13	14	15	16	17	18	19	20	Pts	Pos
1	(Croatia) (15) Jurica Pavlič	14				3			3			2						3	3				14	1
2	(Poland) (2) Sebastian Ułamek	13	3					3				3				3				1			13	2
3	(Denmark) (1) Patrick Hougaard	11	2				1				3				3				2				11	3
4	(Slovenia) (9) Matej Ferjan	10			2		2						3					E		3			10	4
5	(Poland) (10) Zbigniew Suchecki	10			3			2						2			2		1				10	5
6	(Russia) (13) Denis Gizatullin	9				0	3							3		2					1		9	6
7	(Czech Republic) (16) Lukáš Dryml	9				1				3	E						3			2			9	7
8	(Germany) (6) Christian Hefenbrock	9		2				1			2							2			2		9	8
9	(Austria) (4) Manuel Hauzinger	7	1							2				1				1				2	7	9
10	(Poland) (5) Mariusz Staszewski	6		1			0					1					1					3	6	10
11	(Sweden) (11) Sebastian Aldén	6			1				2		1					1						1	6	11
12	(Czech Republic) (7) Aleš Dryml, Jr.	5		3					E					0	2					0			5	12
13	(Denmark) (3) Nikolai Klindt	5	0						1				1				0				3		5	13
14	(Denmark) (14) Kenneth Hansen	5				2		E					2		1							0	5	14
15	(Poland) (17) Daniel Jeleniewski	1								1													1	15
16	(Czech Republic) (8) Tomáš Suchánek	0		0						0			0			0			0				0	16
17	(Denmark) (12) Henrik Møller	0			0					T		0			0						0		0	17
-	(Sweden) (18) Eric Andersson	-																					0	-
Placing	Rider	Total	1	2	3	4	5	6	7	8	9	10	11	12	13	14	15	16	17	18	19	20	Pts	Pos

m - exclusion for exceeding two minute time allowance • t - exclusion for touching the tapes • x - other exclusion • e - retired or mechanical failure • f - fell • ns - non-starter • nc - non-classify

gate A - inside	gate B	gate C	gate D - outside

Heat after heats:
1. Ułamek, Hougaard, Hauzinger, Klindt
2. A. Dryml, Hefenbrock, Staszewski, Suchánek
3. Suchecki, Ferjan, Aldén, Moller
4. Pavlič, Hansen, L. Dryml, Gizatullin
5. Gizatullin, Ferjan, Hougaard, Staszewski
6. Ułamek, Suchecki, Hefenbrock, Hansen (e)
7. Pavlič, Aldén, Klindt, A. Dryml (e)
8. L. Dryml, Hauzinger, Jeleniewski, Suchánek (Moller – t)
9. Hougaard, Hefenbrock, Aldén, L. Dryml (e)
10. Ułamek, Pavlič, Staszewski, Moller
11. Ferjan, Hansen, Klindt, Suchánek
12. Gizatullin, Suchecki, Hauzinger, A. Dryml
13. Hougaard, A. Dryml, Hansen, Moller
14. Ułamek, Gizatullin, Aldén, Suchánek
15. L. Dryml, Suchecki, Staszewski, Klindt
16. Pavlič, Hefenbrock, Hauzinger, Ferjan (e)
17. Pavlič, Hougaard, Suchecki, Suchánek
18. Ferjan, L. Dryml, Ułamek, A. Dryml
19. Klindt, Hefenbrock, Gizatullin, Moller
20. Staszewski, Hauzinger, Aldén, Hansen

Pos.	Rider	Points	Heats
1	(Croatia) (15) Jurica Pavlič	14	(3,3,2,3,3)
2	(Poland) (2) Sebastian Ułamek	13	(3,3,3,3,1)
3	(Denmark) (1) Patrick Hougaard	11	(2,1,3,3,2)
4	(Slovenia) (9) Matej Ferjan	10	(2,2,3,e,3)
5	(Poland) (10) Zbigniew Suchecki	10	(3,2,2,2,1)
6	(Russia) (13) Denis Gizatullin	9	(0,3,3,2,1)
7	(Czech Republic) (16) Lukáš Dryml	9	(1,3,e,3,2)
8	(Germany) (6) Christian Hefenbrock	9	(2,1,2,2,2)
9	(Austria) (4) Manuel Hauzinger	7	(1,2,1,1,2)
10	(Poland) (5) Mariusz Staszewski	6	(1,0,1,1,3)
11	(Sweden) (11) Sebastian Aldén	6	(1,2,1,1,1)
12	(Czech Republic) (7) Aleš Dryml, Jr.	5	(3,e,0,2,0)
13	(Denmark) (3) Nikolai Klindt	5	(0,1,1,0,3)
14	(Denmark) (14) Kenneth Hansen	5	(2,e,2,1,0)
15	(Poland) (17) Daniel Jeleniewski	4	(1)
16	(Czech Republic) (8) Tomáš Suchánek	0	(0,0,0,0,0)
17	(Denmark) (12) Henrik Møller	0	(0,t/-,0,0,0)
	(Sweden) (18) Eric Andersson		
