= 2006 Polish speedway season =

Motorcycle racing competition

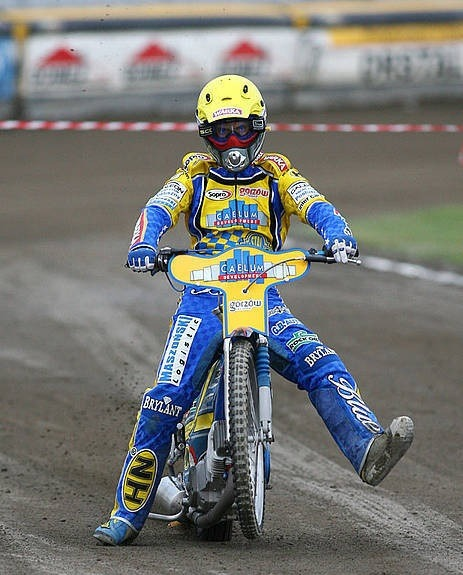
- Tomasz Gollob dominated the Polish season again

The 2006 Polish Speedway season was the 2006 season of motorcycle speedway in Poland.

== Individual ==
=== Polish Individual Speedway Championship ===
The 2006 Individual Speedway Polish Championship final was held on 15 August at Tarnów.

Pos.	Rider	Club	Points	Total
1	Tomasz Gollob	Tarnów	3,2,3,2,3	13
2	Wiesław Jaguś	Toruń	3,3,3,2,1	12
3	Sebastian Ułamek	Częstochowa	3,2,0,3,3	11
4	Jarosław Hampel	Wrocław	2,3,0,3,2	10
5	Krzysztof Jabłoński	Gdańsk	2,1,2,3,2	10
6	Rafał Dobrucki	Leszno	3,1,2,0,3	9
7	Piotr Protasiewicz	Bydgoszcz	1,3,3,1,0	8
8	Jacek Rempała	Lublin	1,3,2,2,0	8
9	Damian Baliński	Leszno	2,0,3,1,2	8
10	Tomasz Jędrzejak	Ostrów	1,2,1,3,1	8
11	Jacek Gollob	Tarnów	0,2,1,0,3	6
12	Jacek Krzyżaniak	Grudziądz	2,1,0,2,1	6
13	Zbigniew Suchecki	Zielona Góra	0,0,1,1 2	4
14	Tomasz Chrzanowski	Rzeszów	0,0,2,0,1	3
15	Adam Skórnicki	Poznań	0,1,1,1,0	3
16	Krzysztof Słaboń	Toruń	1,0,0,0,d	1
17	Krzysztof Buczkowski	Bydgoszcz	ns	
18	Karol Ząbik	Toruń	ns	

=== Golden Helmet ===
The 2006 Golden Golden Helmet (Polish: Turniej o Złoty Kask, ZK) organised by the Polish Motor Union (PZM) was the 2006 event for the league's leading riders. The final was held on the 14 October at Rybnik.

Pos.	Rider	Club	Total	Points
1	Tomasz Gollob	Tarnów	15	(3,3,3,3,3)
2	Sebastian Ułamek	Częstochowa	13	(3,2,3,2,3)
3	Piotr Protasiewicz	Bydgoszcz	12	(3,1,2,3,3)
4	Wiesław Jaguś	Toruń	10+3	(1,3,3,1,2)
5	Robert Kościecha	Bydgoszcz	10+2	(2,3,1,1,3)
6	Jarosław Hampel	Wrocław	10+1	(3,3,1,3,0)
7	Grzegorz Walasek	Zielona Góra	9	(2,2,3,0,2)
8	Krzysztof Słaboń	Toruń	7	(1,1,2,2,1)
9	Mariusz Węgrzyk	Ostrów Wlkp.	6	(0,0,2,2,2)
10	Michał Szczepaniak	Ostrów Wlkp.	6	(1,2,0,2,1)
11	Tomasz Gapiński	Wrocław	5	(0,1,0,3,1)
12	Krzysztof Buczkowski	Bydgoszcz	5	(2,0,2,1,0)
13	Adrian Miedziński	Toruń	5	(0,2,1,1,1)
14	Tomasz Chrzanowski	Rzeszów	3	(1,0,0,0,2)
15	Mariusz Staszewski	Zielona Góra	3	(2,0,1,0,d)
16	Damian Baliński	Leszno	1	(0,1,d,0,0)
17	Tomasz Jędrzejak (res)	Ostrów Wlkp.	ns	

=== Junior Championship ===
- winner - Karol Ząbik

=== Silver Helmet ===
- winner - Karol Ząbik

=== Bronze Helmet ===
- winner - Mateusz Szczepaniak

== Pairs ==
=== Polish Pairs Speedway Championship ===
The 2006 Polish Pairs Speedway Championship consisted of three semi finals and a final.

First semi-final (Gorzów Wlkp. 16 June)

Pos	Team	Pts	Riders
1	Rybnik	20	Roman Povazhny 10, Roman Chromik 10
2	Ostrów	20	Mariusz Węgrzyk 8, Tomasz Jędrzejak 7, Michał Szczepaniak 5
3	Gorzów	19	Piotr Paluch 13, Michał Rajkowski 6, Andrzej Głuchy 0
4	Rzeszów	12	Maciej Kuciapa 7, Karol Baran 5
5	Rawicz	8	Bolesław Kułtucki 4, Adrian Płuska 4, Krzysztof Nowacki 0
6	Łódź	8	Tomasz Zywertowski 4, Marcin Kozdraś 4

Second semi final (Częstochowa, 16 June)

Pos	Team	Pts	Riders
1	Częstochowa	22	Sebastian Ułamek 10, Sławomir Drabik 9, Mateusz Szczepaniak 3
2	Wrocław	18	Jarosław Hampel 12, Ronnie Jamroży 6
3	Poznań	15	Andrzej Huszcza 9, Adam Skórnicki 6
4	Lublin	15	Jacek Rempała 10, Daniel Jeleniewski 5
5	Zielona Góra	11	Zbigniew Suchecki 9, Marin Nowaczyk 1, Grzegorz Zengota 1
6	Grudziądz	9	Dariusz Fijałkowski 9, Krystian Barański 0

Third semi final (Leszno, 16 June)

Pos	Team	Pts	Riders
1	Leszno	23	Rafał Dobrucki 13, Robert Miśkowiak 10
2	Krosno	19	Łukasz Szmid 10, Robert Wardzała 9
3	Toruń	15	Karol Ząbik 11, Mariusz Puszakowski 4
4	Tarnów	12	Paweł Hlib 8, Marcin Rempała 4, Kamil Zieliński 0
5	Krosno II	11	Tomasz Łukaszewicz 11, Daniel Bienia 0, Krzysztof Bęben 0
6	Opole	10	Łukasz Szmidt 6 Łukasz Kasperek 4

Final (1 Sep, Polonia Stadium)

Pos	Team	Pts	Riders
1	Częstochowa	29	Sebastian Ułamek 15, Sławomir Drabik 14
2	Bydgoszcz	23	Piotr Protasiewicz 12, Andreas Jonsson 11, Robert Kościecha 0
3	Rybnik	18	Roman Povazhny 10, Roman Chromik 8
4	Wrocław	16	Piotr Świderski 10, Tomasz Gapiński 6
5	Ostrów	15	Mariusz Węgrzyk 9, Michał Szczepaniak 6
6	Leszno	15	Rafał Dobrucki 11, Krzysztof Kasprzak 4, Damian Baliński 0
7	Krosno	10	Rafał Trojanowski 6, Robert Wardzała 4

== Team ==
=== Team Speedway Polish Championship ===
The 2006 Team Speedway Polish Championship was the 2006 edition of the Team Polish Championship. WTS Wrocław won the gold medal for the second consecutive season.

==== Ekstraliga ====
Pos	Team	P	W	D	L	Pts	BP	Total	Diff
1	Atlas Wrocław	20	16	0	4	32	9	41	242
2	Włókniarz Częstochowa	20	12	1	7	25	6	31	87
3	Polonia Bydgoszcz	20	9	1	10	19	5	24	52
4	Unia Tarnów	20	9	0	11	18	3	21	-161
5	Unia Leszno	20	10	1	9	21	6	27	51
6	Stal Rzeszów	20	11	0	8	22	4	26	56
7	Apator Toruń	20	10	1	9	21	4	25	57
8	RKM Rybnik	20	1	0	19	2	0	2	-384

==== 1.Liga ====
Pos	Team	P	W	D	L	Diff	Pts	BP	Total
1	ZKŻ Zielona Góra	18	14	1	3	324	29	8	37
2	Ostrów Wlkp.	18	15	0	3	262	30	7	37
3	Start Gniezno	18	10	0	8	-35	20	4	24
4	Stal Gorzów Wielkopolski	18	6	1	11	-48	13	3	16
5	TŻ Lublin	16	6	0	10	-23	12	5	17
6	GTŻ Grudziądz	16	4	0	12	-205	8	2	10
7	KSŻ Krosno	16	4	0	12	-275	8	0	8

==== 2.Liga ====
Pos	Team	P	W	D	L	Diff	Pts	BP	Total
1	Wybrzeże Gdańsk	16	13	1	2	293	27	8	35
2	PSŻ Poznań	16	12	1	3	296	25	7	32
3	Lokomotiv Daugavpils (Latvia)	16	12	0	4	180	24	6	30
4	Kolejarz Opole	16	8	1	7	61	17	4	21
5	Rivne Speedway (Ukraine)	16	6	1	9	–27	13	4	17
6	Orzeł Łódź	16	7	1	8	–79	15	2	17
7	Speedway Miskolc (Hungary)	16	6	1	9	–82	13	2	15
8	Kolejarz Rawicz	16	5	0	11	–109	10	3	13
9	Polonia Piła	16	0	0	16	–533	0	0	0

Promotion/relegation play offs

- Toruń - Ostrów Wlkp. (108–82)
- Krosno - Poznań (82–96)
