= Daniel Pytel =

Polish speedway rider

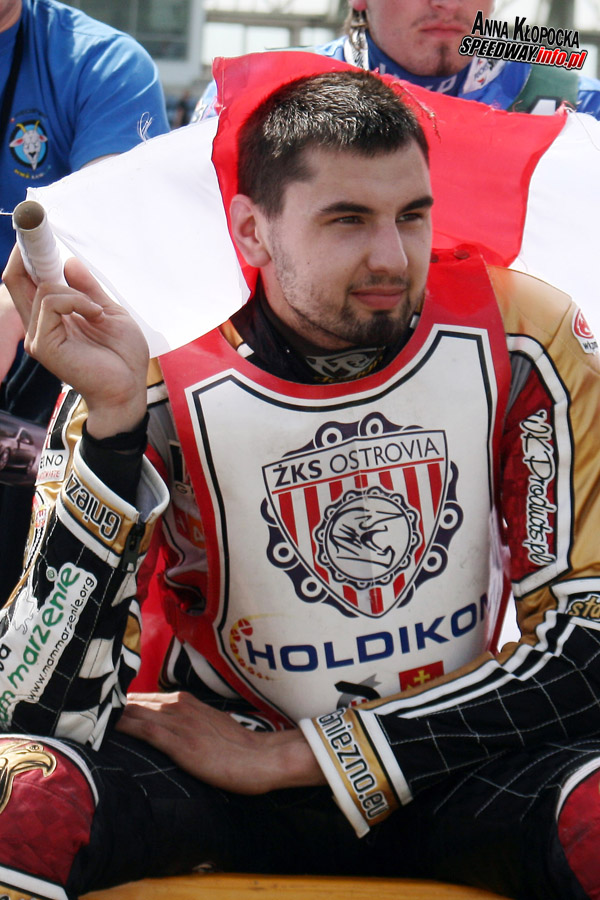
- Born: 23 November 1987 (age 38); Barlinek, Poland
- Nationality: Polish

Career history

Poland
- 2005: Zielona Góra
- 2006–2007, 2017: Poznań
- 2010: Ostrów
- 2011: Rybnik
- 2012: Opole
- 2013: Łódź
- 2014–2016: Kraków

Denmark
- 2007: Grindsted
- 2009–2010: Brovst
- 2012: Fjelsted

Individual honours
- 2008 - silver medal: U-21 Polish Championship

Team honours
- 2008: Team U-21 World Champion

Daniel Pytel (born 23 November 1987 in Barlinek, Poland) is a Polish former motorcycle speedway rider.

== Career ==
Pytel was a member of Poland U-21 team. He was a member of the 2008 Team Speedway Junior World Championship winning team and the Individual U-21 Polish Vice-Champion.

Pytel was a student in University of Zielona Góra.

Pytel rode in the Team Speedway Polish Championship for, Zielona Góra , Poznań, Ostrów, Rybnik, Opole, Łódź and Kraków.

== Results ==
=== World Championships ===
- Team U-21 World Championship
  - 2008 - (Denmark) Holsted - World Champion (5 points)

=== European Championships ===
- Individual European Championship
  - 2009 - 11th place in Qualifying Round 2

=== Domestic competitions ===
- Individual Polish Championship
  - 2008 - 8th place in Quarter-Final 4
  - 2009 - 10th place in Quarter-Final 4
- Individual U-21 Polish Championship
  - 2007 - (Poland) Rzeszów - Bronze medal
  - 2008 - (Poland) Rybnik - Silver medal (13+2 points)
- Team Polish Championship
  - 2004 - dit not started
  - 2005 - CMA 0.500
  - 2006 - CMA 1.981
  - 2007 - CMA 1.140
- Polish Silver Helmet (U-21)
  - 2008 - (Poland) Rzeszów - 9th place (8 points)

== See also ==
- Poland national speedway team
