= 2008 Individual Speedway European Championship =

Motorcycle racing competition

Seasons
- ← 2007 2009 →

The 2008 Individual Speedway European Championship

Jurica Pavlič from Croatia is the defending European champion.

== Calendar ==
Day	Venue	Winner	
Qualifying Rounds
27 April	(Germany) Neustadt/Donau	(Poland) Adrian Miedziński	result
17 May	(Hungary) Gyula	(Hungary) Matej Ferjan	result
18 May	(Ukraine) Lviv	(Poland) Tomasz Gapiński	result
Semi-Finals
24 May	(Italy) Terenzano	(Russia) Denis Gizatullin	result
8 June	(Germany) Herxheim	(Sweden) Mikael Max	result
21 June	(Hungary) Debrecen	(Russia) Daniil Ivanov	result
Final
24 August	(Slovenia) Lendava	(Slovenia) Matej Žagar	result

== Allocation ==
Rules:

Qualifying Rounds

- Riders placed 1st to 8th + 2R in Qualifying Round 1 will advance to Semi-Final 1.
- Riders placed 1st to 8th + 2R in Qualifying Round 2 will advance to Semi-Final 2.
- Riders placed 1st to 8th + 2R in Qualifying Round 3 will advance to Semi-Final 3.

Semi-Finals

- Riders placed 1st to 5th + 1R in semi-final 1 and Semi-Final 2 will qualify for the Final.
- Riders placed 1st to 6th in semi-final 3 will qualify for the Final. But, if no Slovak rider qualifies for the Final, then only 5 riders will qualify from Semi-Final 3.

FMNs	Total	Qualification			Semi-Finals			F
FMNs	Total	1	2	3	1	2	3	F
FMNs	Total	(Germany)	(Hungary)	(Ukraine)	(Italy)	(Germany)	(Hungary)	(Slovenia)
Czech Republic (ACCR)	7	1	2	2	2			
Slovenia (AMZS)	4	2	1				1	
Germany (DMSB)	7	2	1	2		2		
Denmark (DMU)	6	2	2				2	
France (FFM)	2	2						
Belgium (FMB)	1	1						
Italy (FMI)	3			1	2			
Switzerland (FMS)	1		1					
Ukraine (FMU)	3			2			1	
Romania (FRM)	2			2				
Croatia (HMS)	3	2					1	
Netherlands (KNMV)	3		2			1		
Latvia (LaMSF)	2			2				
Hungary (MAMS)	4		2				2	
Russia (MFR)	6		2	2	1	1		
Austria (OeAMTC)	3	2			1			
Poland (PZM)	8	2	1	2	1	2		
Slovakia (SMF)	2			1			1	
Finland (SML)	2		1		1			
Sweden (SVEMO)	3		1			2		
TOTAL	72	16	16	16	8	8	8	

== Qualifying rounds ==
=== Neustadt/Donau ===
- Qualifying Round 1
- 2008-04-27 (2pm)
- (Germany) Neustadt/Donau
- Referee: ?
- Attendance: ?
- Best Time: ?

Pos.	Rider	Points	Details
1	(Poland) (5) Adrian Miedziński	14	(3,3,2,3,3)
2	(Czech Republic) (12) Adrian Rymel	13+3	(3,3,3,1,3)
3	(Germany) (7) Kevin Wölbert	13+2	(2,2,3,3,3)
4	(Denmark) (3) Mads Korneliussen	11	(3,3,3,2,?)
5	(Poland) (1) Daniel Jeleniewski	10	(2,?,3,2,3)
6	(Denmark) (10) Patrick Hougaard	10	(2,3,2,1,2)
7	(Slovenia) (2) Izak Šantej	8	(1,2,1,2,2)
8	(Germany) (14) Mathias Schultz	7	(3,?,2,0,2)
9	(Slovenia) (16) Maks Gregorič	6	(1,2,2,?,1)
10	(Germany) (17) Frank Facher	5+3	(2,3,?,?)
11	(Croatia) (6) Ivan Vargek	5+2	(0,1,0,2,2)
12	(Austria) (15) Manuel Novotny	4	(?/-,1,0,3,0)
13	(Austria) (8) Fritz Wallner	4	(1,1,?,1,1)
14	(Switzerland) (13) Sirg Schützbach	3	(0,2,1,0,T/-)
15	(France) (9) Sebastien Trésarrieu	2	(1,?,1,D,0)
16	(Croatia) (11) Nikola Martinec	2	(?,0,1,?/-,1)
17	(France) (4) Theo di Palma	1	(0,0,?,1,-)
-	(Germany) (18) Sebastian Mack	-	-
(17 Facher) in heats: 4, 14, 19, 20

=== Gyula ===
- Qualifying Round 2
- 2008-05-17 (5 pm)
- (Hungary) Christián László Municipal Sports Complex, Gyula
- Referee:
- Jury President:
- Qualify: 8 + 2R
- Changes: Riders 1 (GER), 9 (SWE) and 14 (NED) was replaced by two Track Reserves (HUN).

Pos.	Rider	Points	Details
1	(Hungary) (5) Matej Ferjan	14	(3,3,3,2,3)
2	(Denmark) (15) Morten Risager	12+3	(2,3,2,3,2)
3	(Czech Republic) (10) Filip Šitera	12+2	(3,3,1,3,2)
4	(Hungary) (7) Laszlo Szatmari	11	(1,3,2,2,3)
5	(Russia) (3) Alexey Kharchenko	10	(2,2,3,0,3)
6	(Hungary) (2) Robert Nagy	9	(3,2,1,3,0)
7	(Hungary) (17) Zsolt Bencze	9	(1,2,2,2,2)
8	(Denmark) (12) Anders Andersen	8+3	(3,1,0,3,1)
9	(Poland) (16) Marcin Piekarski	8+2	(1,2,3,1,1)
10	(Czech Republic) (8) Josef Franc	8+1	(2,1,1,1,3)
11	(Russia) (13) Ruslan Gatiatov	8+E1	(2,1,3,2,0)
12	(Slovenia) (4) Matic Voldrih	4	(1,0,0,1,2)
13	(Finland) (6) Petri Koskela	3	(0,0,2,0,1)
14	(Hungary) (18) Roland Kovacs	3	(0,1,0,1,1)
15	(Netherlands) (11) Jeroen van der Veen	1	(w,0,1,0,0)

=== Lviv ===
- Qualifying Round 3
- 2008-05-18 (4:20 pm)
- (Ukraine) Lviv
- Referee:
- Jury President:
- Qualify: 8 + 2R
- Changes:
  - (10 SVK) Martin Vaculík and (16 GER) Daniel Rath were replaced by Track Reserves.

Pos.	Rider	Points	Details
1	(Poland) (4) Tomasz Gapiński	14+3	(2,3,3,3,3)
2	(Latvia) (5) Maksims Bogdanovs	14+2	(3,3,3,3,2)
3	(Russia) (13) Roman Ivanov	11	(3,0,2,3,3)
4	(Czech Republic) (9) Matěj Kůs	10	(X/F,2,3,2,3)
5	(Czech Republic) (1) Michael Hádek	10	(3,1,3,2,1)
6	(Latvia) (11) Jevgēņijs Karavackis	10	(3,3,2,1,1)
7	(Poland) (7) Karol Baran	9	(2,2,0,3,2)
8	(Russia) (8) Daniil Ivanov	8+3	(1,1,1,2,3)
9	(Ukraine) (12) Oleksandr Boroday	8+2	(1,2,2,1,2)
10	(Ukraine) (14) Yaroslav Poliyhovich	7	(2,3,2,0,0)
11	(Ukraine) (10) Volodymyr Trofimov	6	(2,E,1,1,2)
12	(Italy) (3) Alessandro Milanese	5	(1,1,0,2,1)
13	(Romania) (2) Alexandru Toma	3	(0,2,0,0,1)
14	(Germany) (15) Ronny Weis	3	(1,0,1,1,0)
15	(Romania) (6) Fanica Popa	1	(0,1,T,0,0)
16	(Ukraine) (16) Andriy Sinkovskiy	1	(E,E,1,E,X)
-	(Slovakia) (17) Ratislav Bandzi	-	-

== Semi-finals ==
=== Terenzano ===
- Semi-Final 1
- 2008-05-24 (4:20 pm)
- (Italy) Terenzano
- Referee:
- Jury President:
- Qualify: 5 + 1R
- Change:
  - Mathias Schultz (GER 8th in QR) would not be able to participate in the SF1.
  - (14) (Austria) Manuel Hauzinger was replaced by 1st track reserve (Germany) Frank Facher; Facher was replaced by 2nd track reserve (Croatia) Ivan Vargek

Pos.	Rider	Points	Details
1	(Russia) (9) Denis Gizatullin	14+3	(3,2,3,3,3)
2	(Poland) (1) Sebastian Ułamek	14+2	(3,3,3,3,2)
3	(Poland) (2) Adrian Miedziński	12	(2,2,3,3,2)
4	(Denmark) (15) Mads Korneliussen	11	(2,2,2,2,3)
5	(Czech Republic) (3) Aleš Dryml, Jr.	10	(1,3,1,3,2)
6	(Italy) (11) Mattia Carpanese	9+3	(1,1,2,2,3)
7	(Germany) (13) Kevin Wölbert	9+2	(3,1,3,1,1)
8	(Czech Republic) (8) Adrian Rymel	8	(2,3,2,0,1)
9	(Poland) (10) Daniel Jeleniewski	7	(2,3,2,0,0)
10	(Slovenia) (5) Izak Šantej	6	(3,0,0,1,2)
11	(Finland) (6) Juha Hautamäki	5	(0,1,1,0,3)
12	(Denmark) (16) Patrick Hougaard	5	(1,2,0,2,X)
13	(Czech Republic) (7) Tomáš Suchánek	4	(1,0,0,2,1)
14	(Italy) (12) Marco Gregnanin	3	(0,0,1,2,0)
15	(Slovenia) (4) Maks Gregorič	3	(0,1,1,1,F)
16	(Croatia) (18) Ivan Vargek	1	(0,0,0,0,1)

=== Herxheim ===
- Semi-Final 2
- 2008-06-08
- (Germany) Herxheim
- Referee:
- Jury President:
- Qualify: 5 + 1R
- Change:
  No 5 – Zsolt Bencze (HUN) was replaced by Maciej Piekarski (POL)
  No 7 – Laszlo Szatmari (HUN) was replaced by Josef Franc (CZE)
  No 4 – Sebastian Aldén (SWE) was replaced by Ruslan Gatiatov (RUS)

Pos.	Rider	Points	Details
1	(Sweden) (11) Mikael Max	14	(3,3,3,3,2)
2	(Germany) (9) Martin Smolinski	13+3	(2,2,3,3,3)
3	(Germany) (14) Christian Hefenbrock	13+2	(3,3,2,2,3)
4	(Russia) (1) Sergey Darkin	12	(3,1,2,3,3)
5	(Czech Republic) (13) Filip Šitera	12	(2,3,3,2,2)
6	(Czech Republic) (7) Josef Franc	7+3	(0,2,2,1,2)
7	(Russia) (10) Alexey Kharchenko	7+2	(0,2,0,3,2)
8	(Denmark) (8) Morten Risager	6	(3,3,0,0,-)
9	(Hungary) (2) Matej Ferjan	6	(2,0,3,1,0)
10	(Netherlands) (3) Henk Bos	6	(1,0,1,1,3)
11	(Russia) (4) Ruslan Gatiatov	6	(0,2,1,2,1)
12	(Hungary) (16) Robert Nagy	5	(1,1,0,2,1)
13	(Poland) (6) Borys Miturski	5	(1,1,1,1,1)
14	(Denmark) (12) Anders Andersen	3	(1,0,2,0,0)
15	(Poland) (5) Marcin Piekarski	2	(2,0,F,0,0)
16	(Poland) (15) Przemysław Zarzycki	1	(0,1,F,0,0)
17	(Slovenia) (17) Matic Voldrih	1	(1)

=== Debrecen ===
- Semi-Final 3
- 2008-06-21
- (Hungary) Debrecen
- Referee:
- Jury President:
- Change:
  - No 2 Tomasz Gapiński (POL) was replaced by track reserve
  - No 7 Henning Bager (DEN) was replaced by Peter Juul Larsen (DEN)

Pos.	Rider	Points	Details
1	(Russia) (4) Daniil Ivanov	15	(3,3,3,3,3)
2	(Slovenia) (6) Matej Žagar	13	(3,3,3,1,3)
3	(Hungary) (9) Sandor Tihanyi	11	(2,3,1,2,3)
4	(Denmark) (1) Ulrich Ostergaard	10	(0,2,2,3,3)
5	(Czech Republic) (15) Matěj Kůs	9	(3,2,2,0,2)
6	(Latvia) (8) Maksims Bogdanovs	9	(2,2,2,2,1)
7	(Ukraine) (2) Oleksandr Boroday	8	(2,E,3,3,0)
8	(Croatia) (14) Jurica Pavlic	8	(1,2,3,0,2)
9	(Russia) (13) Roman Ivanov	8	(2,1,2,1,2)
10	(Ukraine) (12) Andriy Karpov	7	(3,1,1,1,1)
11	(Poland) (5) Karol Baran	5	(1,E,0,3,1)
12	(Denmark) (7) Peter Juul Larsen	5	(0,1,1,2,1)
13	(Hungary) (11) Jozsef Tabaka	4	(1,3,X,0,0)
14	(Latvia) (16) Jevgēņijs Karavackis	4	(0,0,1,1,2)
15	(Czech Republic) (10) Michael Hádek	3	(0,1,0,2,0)
16	(Slovakia) (3) Ratislav Bandzi	1	(1,0,X,X,N)
-	(Ukraine) (17) Yaroslav Poliyhovich	-	-
-	(Ukraine) (18) Volodymyr Trofimov	-	-

== Final ==
- Final
- 2008-08-24 (1:30 pm)
- (Slovenia) Lendava
- Referee: (Germany) Frank Ziegler
- Jury President:
- (11) Christian Hefenbrock was replaced by J. Franc
- (15) Maksims Bogdanovs was replaced by M. Carpanese

Placing	Rider	Total	1	2	3	4	5	6	7	8	9	10	11	12	13	14	15	16	17	18	19	20	Pts	Pos	21	22	23	24
1	(Slovenia) (3) Matej Žagar	14	3						3				3				2				3		14	1				
2	(Poland) (5) Sebastian Ułamek	10		3			1					3					0					3	10	3		3		3
3	(Denmark) (4) Mads Korneliussen	10	1							2				2				3				2	10	7		2	2	2
4	(Czech Republic) (16) Matěj Kůs	10				2				3	0						3			2			10	4		1	3	N
5	(Russia) (1) Denis Gizatullin	10	2				2				2				1				3				10	6	3			X
6	(Czech Republic) (11) Josef Franc	10			3				2		1					3						1	10	5	E		1	
7	(Czech Republic) (13) Aleš Dryml, Jr.	10				3	3							3		1					0		10	2	E		E	
8	(Russia) (7) Daniil Ivanov	9		1					1					1	3					3			9	8				
9	(Sweden) (6) Mikael Max	9		2				1			3							2			1		9	9				
10	(Germany) (10) Martin Smolinski	7			1			3						0			1		2				7	10				
11	(Poland) (12) Adrian Miedziński	6			E					T		2			2						2		6	11				
12	(Denmark) (9) Ulrich Ostergaard	6			2		0						2					1		1			6	12				
13	(Russia) (2) Sergey Darkin	5	0					2				1				2				0			5	13				
14	(Czech Republic) (14) Filip Šitera	2				1		0					1		0							0	2	14				
15	(Hungary) (8) Sandor Tihanyi	2		0						1			0			0			1				2	15				
16	(Italy) (15) Mattia Carpanese	0				0			0			0						0	0				0	16				
	(Russia) (17) Alexey Kharchenko	0																					0					
Placing	Rider	Total	1	2	3	4	5	6	7	8	9	10	11	12	13	14	15	16	17	18	19	20	Pts	Pos	21	22	23	24

m - exclusion for exceeding two minute time allowance • t - exclusion for touching the tapes • x - other exclusion • e - retired or mechanical failure • f - fell • ns - non-starter • nc - non-classify

gate A - inside	gate B	gate C	gate D - outside

Heat after heat:

1. Zagar, Gizatullin, Korneliussen, Darkin
2. Ułamek, Max, Iwanow, Tihanyi
3. Franc, Ostergaard, Smolinski, Miedziński (E)
4. Dryml, Kus, Sitera, Carpanese
5. Dryml, Gizatullin, Ułamek, Ostergaard
6. Smolinski, Darkin, Max, Sitera
7. Zagar, Franc, Iwanow, Carpanese
8. Kus, Korneliussen, Tihanyi, Miedziński (T)
9. Max, Gizatullin, Franc, Kus
10. Ułamek, Miedziński, Darkin, Carpanese
11. Zagar, Ostergaard, Sitera, Tihanyi
12. Dryml, Korneliussen, Iwanow, Smolinski
13. Iwanow, Miedziński, Gizatullin, Sitera
14. Franc, Darkin, Dryml, Tihanyi
15. Kus, Zagar, Smolinski, Ułamek
16. Korneliussen, Max, Ostergaard, Carpanese
17. Gizatullin, Smolinski, Tihanyi, Carpanese
18. Iwanow, Kus, Ostergaard, Darkin
19. Zagar, Miedziński, Max, Dryml
20. Ułamek, Korneliussen, Franc, Sitera
  Run-Offs
21. Gizatullin (into 24), Dryml (E; into 23), Franc (E; into 23)
22. Ułamek (into 24), Korneliussen (into 23), Kus (into 23)
23. Kus (into 24), Korneliussen (into 24), Franc, Dryml (E)
24. Ułamek, Korneliussen, Kus (N), Gizatullin (X)

Pos.	Rider	Points	Details
1	(Slovenia) (3) Matej Žagar	14	(3,3,3,2,3)
2	(Poland) (5) Sebastian Ułamek	10+3+3	(3,1,3,0,3)
3	(Denmark) (4) Mads Korneliussen	10+2+2+2	(1,2,2,3,2)
4	(Czech Republic) (16) Matěj Kůs	10+1+3+N	(2,3,0,3,2)
5	(Russia) (1) Denis Gizatullin	10+3+X	(2,2,2,1,3)
6	(Czech Republic) (11) Josef Franc	10+E+1	(3,2,1,3,1)
7	(Czech Republic) (13) Aleš Dryml, Jr.	10+E+E	(3,3,3,1,0)
8	(Russia) (7) Daniil Ivanov	9	(1,1,1,3,3)
9	(Sweden) (6) Mikael Max	9	(2,1,3,2,1)
10	(Germany) (10) Martin Smolinski	7	(1,3,0,1,2)
11	(Poland) (12) Adrian Miedziński	6	(E,T,2,2,2)
12	(Denmark) (9) Ulrich Ostergaard	6	(2,0,2,1,1)
13	(Russia) (2) Sergey Darkin	5	(0,2,1,2,0)
14	(Czech Republic) (14) Filip Šitera	2	(1,0,1,0,0)
15	(Hungary) (8) Sandor Tihanyi	2	(0,1,0,0,1)
16	(Italy) (15) Mattia Carpanese	0	(0,0,0,0,0)
-	(Russia) (18) Alexey Kharchenko	-	-
