= 2006 Speedway Under-21 World Championship =

European motorcycle speedway event

World Under-21 Championship
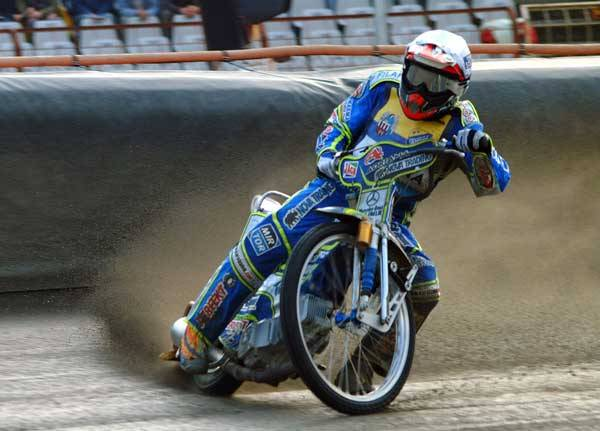
- Karol Ząbik in a league match during 2006
- Venue: Pista Olimpia Terenzano
- Location: Terenzano, Italy
- Start date: 2 September 2006

The 2006 Individual Speedway Junior World Championship was the 30th edition of the World motorcycle speedway Under-21 Championships.

The final was won by Karol Ząbik of Poland.

== World final ==
- 2 September 2006
- (Italy) Pista Olimpia Terenzano, Terenzano

Placing	Rider	Total	1	2	3	4	5	6	7	8	9	10	11	12	13	14	15	16	17	18	19	20	Pts	Pos	21
1	(Poland) (4) Karol Ząbik	13	3							3				2				2				3	13	2	3
2	(Sweden) (9) Antonio Lindbäck	12			2		1						3					3		3			12	4	2
3	(Germany) (12) Christian Hefenbrock	12			3					1		3			3						2		12	3	1
4	(Sweden) (13) Fredrik Lindgren	14				3	3							3		2					3		14	1	F/X
5	(Poland) (6) Paweł Miesiąc	8		3				0			3							1			1		8	5	
6	(Poland) (2) Adrian Miedziński	8	0					2				1				3				2			8	6	
7	(Poland) (14) Paweł Hlib	8				1		3					1		2							1	8	7	
8	(Czech Republic) (16) Zdeněk Simota	6				0				0	2						3			1			6	8	
9	(Sweden) (5) Ricky Kling	6		1			0					2					1					2	6	9	
10	(Denmark) (8) Henrik Møller	6		0						2			2			1			1				6	10	
11	(Croatia) (15) Jurica Pavlič	5				2			0			0						0	3				5	11	
12	(Australia) (11) Chris Holder	5			1				3		1					F/X						0	5	12	
13	(Italy) (3) Mattia Carpanese	5	2						1				0				2				F		5	13	
14	(Sweden) (7) Sebastian Aldén	4		2					2					0	0					E			4	14	
15	(England) (1) Daniel King	4	1				2				0				1				F/X				4	15	
16	(Sweden) (10) Robert Pettersson	2			0			1						1			0		-				2	16	
R1	(Australia) (R1) Troy Batchelor	2																	2				2	R1	
R2	(Czech Republic) (R2) Luboš Tomíček, Jr.	0																					0	R2	
Placing	Rider	Total	1	2	3	4	5	6	7	8	9	10	11	12	13	14	15	16	17	18	19	20	Pts	Pos	21

m - exclusion for exceeding two minute time allowance • t - exclusion for touching the tapes • x - other exclusion • e - retired or mechanical failure • f - fell • ns - non-starter • nc - non-classify

gate A - inside	gate B	gate C	gate D - outside

=== Heat after heat ===
1. Ząbik, Carpanese, King, Miedziński
2. Miesiąc, Aldén, Kling, Moller
3. Hefenbrock, Lindbäck, Holder, Petterson
4. Lindgren, Pavlic, Hlib, Simota
5. Lindgren, King, Lindbäck, Kling
6. Hlib, Miedziński, Petterson, Miesiąc
7. Holder, Aldén, Carpanese, Pavlic
8. Ząbik, Moller, Hefenbrock, Simota
9. Miesiąc, Simota, Holder, King
10. Hefenbrock, Kling, Miedziński, Pavlic
11. Lindbäck, Moller, Hlib, Carpanese
12. Lindgren, Ząbik, Petterson, Aldén
13. Hefenbrock, Hlib, King, Aldén
14. Miedziński, Lindgren, Moller, Holder (F/X)
15. Simota, Carpanese, Kling, Petterson
16. Lindbäck, Ząbik, Miesiąc, Pavlic
17. Pavlic, Batchelor (for Pettersona), Moller, King (F/X)
18. Lindbäck, Miedziński, Simota, Aldén (E)
19. Lindgren, Hefenbrock, Miesiąc, Carpanese (F)
20. Ząbik, Kling, Hlib, Holder
  Big Final:
21. Ząbik, Lindbäck, Hefenbrock, Lindgren (F/X)
