= 2006 Individual Speedway European Championship =

Motorcycle racing competition

Seasons
- ← 2005 2007 →

The 2006 Individual Speedway European Championship

== Qualification ==
- Qualifying Round A:
  - (Italy) Terenzano
- Qualifying Round B:
  - (Netherlands) Blijham
- Qualifying Round C:
  - (Ukraine) Lviv
- Qualifying Round D:
  - (Latvia) Daugavpils
- Semi Final A:
  - (Slovenia) Ljubljana
- Semi Final B:
  - (Sweden) Örebro
- Semi Final C:
  - (Austria) Wiener Neustadt

== Final ==
- October 1, 2006
- (Hungary) Miskolc

Pos.	Rider	Country	Pts.	Heats
1	Krzysztof Jabłoński	Poland	13	(?) +3
2	Grzegorz Walasek	Poland		(?) +2
3	Christian Hefenbrock	Germany	12	?
4	Fredrik Lindgren	Sweden	11	?
5	Matej Ferjan	Slovenia	9	?
6	Adrian Miedziński	Poland	8	?
7	Damian Baliński	Poland	8	?
8	Nicolai Klint	Denmark	8	-
9	Laszlo Szatmari	Hungary	7	-
10	Niklas Klinberg	Sweden	7	-
11	Jan-Mike Bjerk	Norway	6	-
12	Jurica Pavlič	Croatia	6	-
13	Robert Kościecha	Poland	4	-
14	Mattias Nilsson	Sweden	3	-
15	Roman Chromik	Poland	3	-
16	Andrejs Koroļevs	Latvia	2	-
17	Matej Žagar	Slovenia	0	-
