= Zbigniew Suchecki =

Polish speedway racer

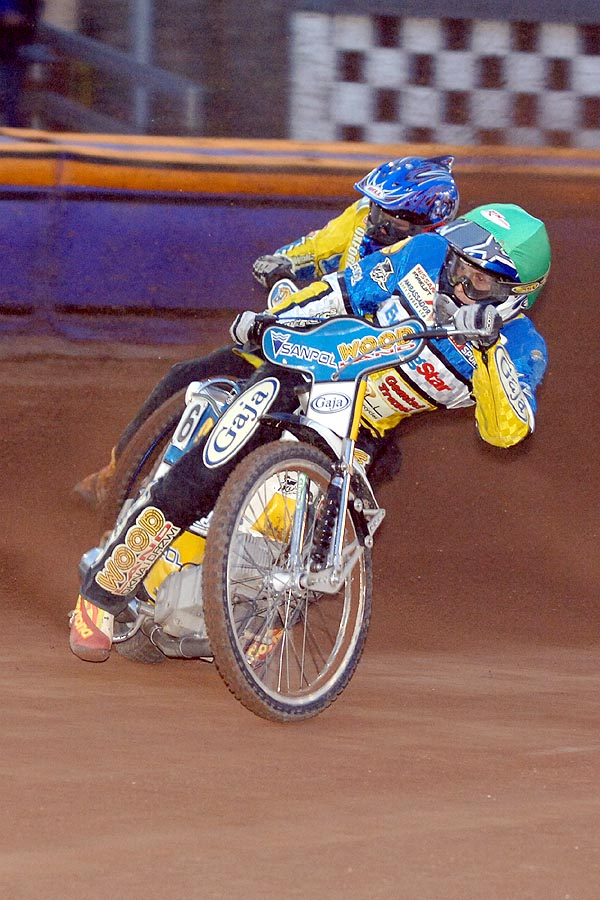
- Suchecki riding for Ipswich in 2007
- Born: 21 July 1984 (age 42); Gorzów Wielkopolski, Poland
- Nickname: Zibi
- Nationality: Polish

Career history

Poland
- 2001–2002, 2010: Gorzów
- 2003–2007: Zielona Góra
- 2008–2009, 2020: Poznań
- 2011: Lublin
- 2012, 2024: Gdańsk
- 2013–2014: Wrocław
- 2015, 2021–2022, 2024: Gniezno
- 2016: Kraków
- 2017–2018: Ostrów

Great Britain
- 2007: Ipswich Witches
- 2008: Poole Pirates

Sweden
- 2006–2007: Lejonen

Denmark
- 2009–2015: Esbjerg

Zbigniew Suchecki (born 21 July 1984 in Gorzów Wielkopolski, Poland) is a motorcycle speedway rider from Poland.

== Career ==
Suchecki rode for Stal Gorzów Wielkopolski from 2001 to 2002, before joining Zielona Góra for five seasons.

In 2007, Suchecki made his British debut for Ipswich Witches, during the same season he was fifth in 2007 Individual Speedway European Championship.

In 2008, Suchecki moved from Ipswich to Poole Pirates for the 2008 Elite League speedway season, which proved to be his last season in Britain. However, he continued to ride in Poland for various clubs in all three divisions of Polish speedway (Ekstraliga, Polish Speedway First League and the Polish Speedway Second League).

In 2022, Suchecki completed his third season for Start Gniezno.

=== European championships ===
- Individual European Championship
  - 2007 – (Austria) Wiener Neustadt – 6th place (10 points)

=== Domestic competitions ===
- Individual Polish Championship
  - 2006 – 13th place
  - 2009 – 10th place in Quarter-Final 1
- Silver Helmet U-21:
  - 2004 – 2nd place

== See also ==
- Poland national speedway team
