= 2005 Polish speedway season =

Motorcycle racing competition

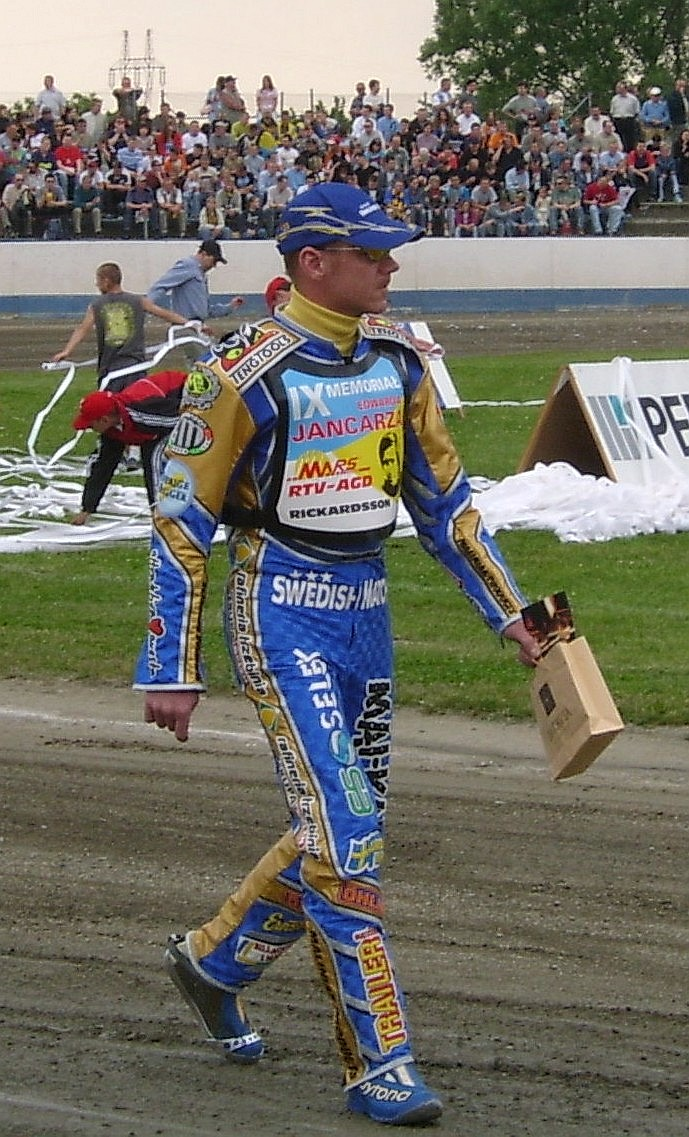
- Tony Rickardsson (pictured) and Tomasz Gollob helped Unia Tarnów win the Polish title

The 2005 Polish Speedway season was the 2005 season of motorcycle speedway in Poland.

== Individual ==
=== Polish Individual Speedway Championship ===
The 2005 Individual Speedway Polish Championship final was held on 15 August at Tarnów.

Pos.	Rider	Club	Total	Points
1	Janusz Kołodziej	Tarnów	15	(3,3,3,3,3)
2	Tomasz Gollob	Tarnów	14	(3,3,3,2,3)
3	Jacek Gollob	Tarnów	13	(3,2,3,3,2)
4	Piotr Protasiewicz	Bydgoszcz	11	(2,2,1,3,3)
5	Marcin Rempała	Tarnów	11	(2,2,2,2,3)
6	Rune Holta	Częstochowa	10	(2,3,2,2,1)
7	Robert Kościecha	Gdańsk	8	(2,1,2,1,2)
8	Krzysztof Kasprzak	Leszno	7	(1,0,3,1,2)
9	Grzegorz Walasek	Częstochowa	7	(1,1,d,3,2)
10	Sebastian Ułamek	Częstochowa	6	(3,3,0,0,0)
11	Damian Baliński	Leszno	5	(1,1,t,2,1)
12	Grzegorz Rempała	Tarnów	4	(0,2,1,0,1)
13	Paweł Staszek (res)	Grudziądz	2	(2)
14	Jacek Rempała	Leszno	2	(1,0,1,0,0)
15	Piotr Paluch	Gorzów Wlkp.	2	(0,0,0,1,1)
16	Piotr Świderski	Wrocław	2	(0,d,1,1,0)
17	Tomasz Jędrzejak	Ostrów Wlkp.	1	(0,1,0,0,0)
18	Maciej Kuciapa (res)	Rzeszów	ns	

=== Golden Helmet ===
The 2005 Golden Golden Helmet (Polish: Turniej o Złoty Kask, ZK) organised by the Polish Motor Union (PZM) was the 2005 event for the league's leading riders. The final was held on the 14 October at Rybnik.

Pos.	Rider	Club	Total	Points
1	Janusz Kołodziej	Tarnów	14	(2,3,3,3,3)
2	Damian Baliński	Leszno	12	(3,2,2,3,2)
3	Krzysztof Słaboń	Wrocław	10 +3	(2,3,3,2,0)
4	Rafał Szombierski	Rybnik	10 +2	(3,2,1,1,3)
5	Mariusz Węgrzyk	Ostrów Wlkp.	10 +1	(0,3,1,3,3)
6	Grzegorz Walasek	Częstochowa	9	(1,1,3,1,3)
7	Piotr Świderski	Wrocław	9	(2,1,2,2,2)
8	Marcin Rempała	Tarnów	7	(d,0,2,3,2)
9	Robert Sawina	Bydgoszcz	7	(3,1,0,2,1)
10	Jordan Jurczyński	Łódź	7	(1,3,1,1,1)
11	Tomasz Gapiński	Wrocław	6	(3,0,3,d,0)
12	Maciej Kuciapa	Rzeszów	5	(2,2,d,0,1)
13	Michal Szczepaniak	Ostrów Wlkp.	5	(1,d,1,2,1)
14	Dawid Cieślewicz	Gniezno	4	(0,d,2,0,2)
15	Krystian Klecha	Bydgoszcz	3	(0,2,0,1,0)
16	Zbigniew Czerwiński	Rybnik	1	(1,w,0,0,0)

=== Junior Championship ===
- winner - Adrian Miedziński

=== Silver Helmet ===
- winner - Janusz Kołodziej

=== Bronze Helmet ===
- winner - Patryk Pawlaszczyk

== Pairs ==
=== Polish Pairs Speedway Championship ===
The 2005 Polish Pairs Speedway Championship was the 2005 edition of the Polish Pairs Speedway Championship. The final was held on 18 September at Wrocław.

Pos	Team	Pts	Riders
1	Stal Rzeszów	24+3	Maciej Kuciapa 8, Dariusz Śledź 16+3
2	Polonia Bydgoszcz	24+2	Piotr Protasiewicz 10, Robert Sawina 14+2
3	Ostrów Wlkp.	22	Michał Szczepaniak 10, Tomasz Jędrzejak 12
4	Atlas Wrocław	20	Krzysztof Słaboń 12, Piotr Świderski 3, Robert Miśkowiak 5
5	Apator Toruń	19	Wiesław Jaguś 12, Mariusz Puszakowski 2, Karol Ząbik 5
6	Gorzów Wlkp.	9	Piotr Paluch 4, Paweł Hlib 0, Krzysztof Pecyna 5
7	Unia Leszno	8	Krzysztof Kasprzak 5, Łukasz Jankowski 2, Norbert Kościuch 1

== Team ==
=== Team Speedway Polish Championship ===
The 2005 Team Speedway Polish Championship was the 2005 edition of the Team Polish Championship. Unia Tarnów won the gold medal for the second consecutive season.

==== Ekstraliga ====
Pos	Team	P	W	D	L	BP	Pts	Diff
1	Polonia Bydgoszcz	14	9	0	5	5	23	75
2	Apator Toruń	14	8	1	5	5	22	18
3	Unia Tarnów	14	9	0	5	4	22	118
4	Włókniarz Częstochowa	14	8	0	6	5	21	49
5	Unia Leszno	14	8	0	6	3	19	32
6	Atlas Wrocław	14	7	0	7	1	15	-30
7	Wybrzeże Gdańsk	14	4	1	9	2	11	-59
8	ZKŻ Zielona Góra	14	2	0	12	0	4	-203

Play offs

- quarter finals
- Tarnów - Wrocław 64–25, 45–45
- Leszno - Częstochowa 46–44, 35–55
- Zielona Góra - Gdańsk 45-45, 31–59
- Wrocław - Leszno 49–41, 39,51
- semi finals
- Częstochowa - Bydgoszcz 47–42, 29–61
- Tarnów - Toruń 62–28, 42–48
- final
- Częstochowa - Tarnów 58–56, 43–46

==== 1.Liga ====
Pos	Team	P	W	D	L	Diff	BP	Pts
1	Stal Gorzów Wielkopolski	14	12	0	2	145	5	29
2	RKM Rybnik	14	11	0	3	231	6	28
3	Stal Rzeszów	14	10	0	4	147	5	25
4	Ostrów Wlkp.	14	10	0	4	203	5	25
5	GTŻ Grudziądz	14	5	1	8	-49	4	15
6	TŻ Lublin	14	3	1	10	-221	2	9
7	KSŻ Krosno	14	3	0	11	-180	1	7
8	Kolejarz Opole	14	1	0	13	-276	0	2

Play offs

- Lublin - Rzeszów 42–48, 28–62
- Grudziądz - Ostrów Wlkp. 48–42, 37–53
- quarter finals
- Ostrów Wlkp. - Gorzów Wlkp. 50–40, 48–42
- Rzeszów - Rybnik 57–33, 46–44
- semi finals
- Rybnik - Gorzów Wlkp. 52–37
- Gorzów Wlkp. - Rybnik 39-50 (102–76)
- final
- Ostrów Wlkp. - Rzeszów 47-43 32–57

==== 2.Liga ====
Pos	Team	P	W	D	L	Diff	BP	Pts
1	Start Gniezno	10	10	0	0	263	5	25
2	Lokomotiv Daugavpils (Latvia)	10	6	0	4	124	4	16
3	Rivne Speedway (Ukraine)	10	6	0	4	12	3	15
4	Kolejarz Rawicz	10	5	0	5	-42	2	12
5	TŻ Łódź	10	3	0	7	-83	1	7
6	Polonia Piła	10	0	0	10	-274	0	0
7	Wanda Kraków+	0	0	0	0	0	0	0

+withdrew

- Play-offs
- Równe - Piła (115:64)
- Rawicz - Łódź (86:94)
- Gniezno - Łódź (107:64)
- Daugavpils - Równe (77:103)
- final
- Gniezno - Równe (103:77)
