= Krystian Klecha =

Polish speedway rider

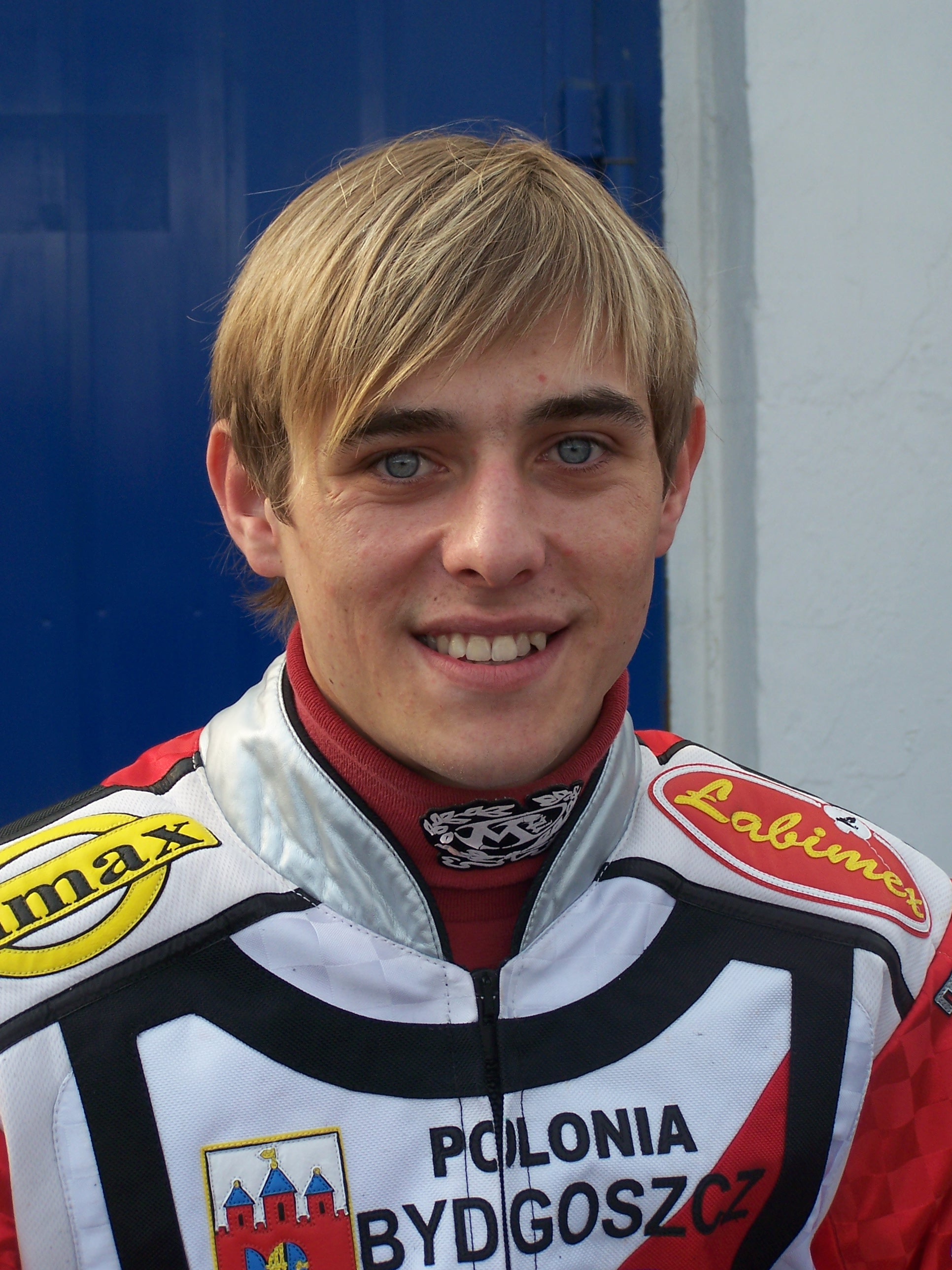
- Born: 30 September 1984 (age 42); Kościan, Poland
- Nationality: Polish

Career history

Poland
- 2001-2003: Piła
- 2004-2007: Bydgoszcz
- 2008: Tarnów
- 2009: Poznań
- 2010: Ostrów

Sweden
- 2007-: Kaparna

Team honours
- 2005: Team U-21 World Champion

Krystian Klecha (born 30 September 1984 in Kościan, Poland) is a Polish speedway rider and a former Team U-21 World Champion.

== Career ==
In 2003, Klecha moved from Polonia Piła, (where he spent three seasons) to Polonia Bydgoszcz.

After leaving Polonia Bydgoszcz, Klecha would ride for Unia Tarnów, PSŻ Poznań and Ostrów.

== Results ==
- Individual Under-21 World Championship
  - 2005 - 10th place (3 points)
- Team Under-21 World Championship
  - 2005 - World Champion (3 points)
- Team Polish Championship
  - 2004 - 5th place with Polonia Bydgoszcz
  - 2005 - Silver medal with Polonia Bydgoszcz
  - 2006 - Bronze medal with Polonia Bydgoszcz
  - 2007 - 8th place with Polonia Bydgoszcz
- Team Under-21 Polish Championship
  - 2004 - 5th place
  - 2005 - 4th place

== See also ==
- Poland national speedway team
