= Daniel Jeleniewski =

Polish speedway rider

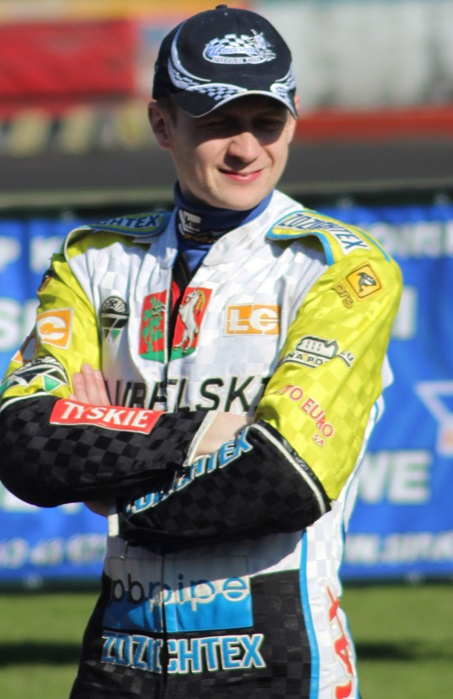
- Born: 27 January 1983 (age 43); Lublin, Poland
- Nationality: Polish

Career history

Poland
- 1999–2007, 2012–2013, 2017-2018: Lublin
- 2008–2010: Wrocław
- 2011, 2019-2020: Łódź
- 2014-2015: Grudziądz
- 2016: Częstochowa
- 2021–2023: Bydgoszcz
- 2024: Tarnów

Denmark
- 2007, 2021: Slangerup
- 2012: Grindsted
- 2013: Outrup

Team honours
- 2008: European Club Champion

Daniel Sebastian Jeleniewski (born 27 January 1983 in Lublin, Poland) is a motorcycle speedway rider from Poland.

== Career ==
Jeleniewski gained his speedway licence in May 1999. He was a member of Poland national team.

During the 2023 season, Jeleniewski suffered a crash and subsequent injury which finished his season.

== Honours ==
- Individual European Championship:
  - 2007 - 15th place (1 points as track reserve)
  - 2008 - 9th place in Semi-Final 1 (7 points)
- European Club Champions' Cup:
  - 2008 - (Czech Republic) Slaný - Bronze medal (7 points)
- Individual Polish Championship:
  - 2005 - 11th place in Quarter-Final (5 points)
  - 2006 - 8th place in Quarter-Final (8 points)
  - 2007 - 4th place (9 points)
- Individual U-21 Polish Championship:
  - 2001 - th place (points)
  - 2002 - 14th place (2 points)
  - 2003 - 9th place (8 points)
  - 2004 - 12th place in Semi-Final (4 points)
- Silver Helmet U-21:
  - 2002 - 14th place in Semi-Final (3 points)
  - 2003 - injury in Final - 8th place in Semi-Final (8 points)
  - 2004 - 13th place (4 points)
- Bronze Helmet U-19:
  - 2000 - 13th place (3 points)
  - 2001 - 10th place in Semi-Final (5 points)
  - 2002 - 10th place (7 points)

== See also ==
- Poland national speedway team
- Speedway in Poland
