= Paweł Miesiąc =

Polish speedway rider

- Born: 27 April 1985 (age 41); Poland
- Nationality: Polish

Career history

Poland
- 2001–2007, 2009, 2014, 2022: Rzeszów
- 2008, 2010: Daugavpils
- 2011–2013, 2017–2020: Lublin
- 2015: Kraków
- 2016, 2024: Opole
- 2021: Grudziądz

Denmark
- 2004: Brovst

Team honours
- 2006: Under-21 World Cup Winner

Paweł Miesiąc (born 24 April 1985 in Poland) is a motorcycle speedway rider from Poland.

== Career ==
Miesiąc has won the Team Under 21 World Champion title.

Miesiąc rode in the Team Speedway Polish Championship from 2001 to 2021, riding for Stal Rzeszów, Lokomotiv Daugavpils, Motor Lublin, Kraków, Kolejarz Opole and GKM Grudziądz.

Miesiąc's surname Miesiąc means 'month' in Polish language.

== Results ==
=== World Championships ===
- Individual U-21 World Championship
  - 2006 - 5th place (8 pts)
- Team Speedway World Championship (U-21 World Cup)
  - 2006 - U-21 Team World Champion (3 pts)

=== European Championships ===
- European Club Champions' Cup
  - 2009 - 4th place (0 pts) for Simon & Wolf Debrecen

=== Domestic competitions ===
- Individual Polish Championship
  - 2009 - 13th place in Semi-Final 2
- Silver Helmet (U-21)
  - 2005 - 2nd place

== See also ==
- Poland national speedway team
- Stal Rzeszów
