= Dawid Stachyra =

Polish speedway rider

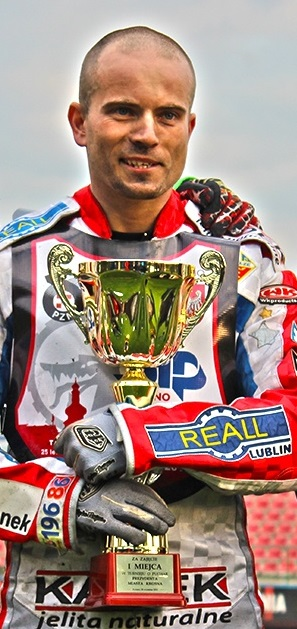
- Born: 15 August 1985 (age 41); Rzeszów, Poland
- Nationality: Polish

Career history

Poland
- 2001–2004, 2007, 2012: Lublin
- 2008–2009, 2020–2021: Rzeszów
- 2010-2011, 2013: Gdańsk
- 2014: Rybnik
- 2015: Krosno
- 2017: Opole

Great Britain
- 2009–2010: Ipswich Witches
- 2011: Belle Vue Aces
- 2013: Poole Pirates
- 2016: Berwick Bandits

Denmark
- 2009: Fjelsted

Individual honours
- 2017: Argentinian Champion

Dawid Stachyra (born 15 August 1985) is a speedway rider from Poland.

== Career ==
Stachyra rode in the top tier of British Speedway riding for the Poole Pirates during the 2013 Elite League speedway season. He started his speedway career in England riding for the Ipswich Witches in 2009.

In 2016, Stachyra signed for Berwick Bandits and in 2017, he won the Argentine Championship.
