= 2004 Polish speedway season =

Motorcycle racing competition

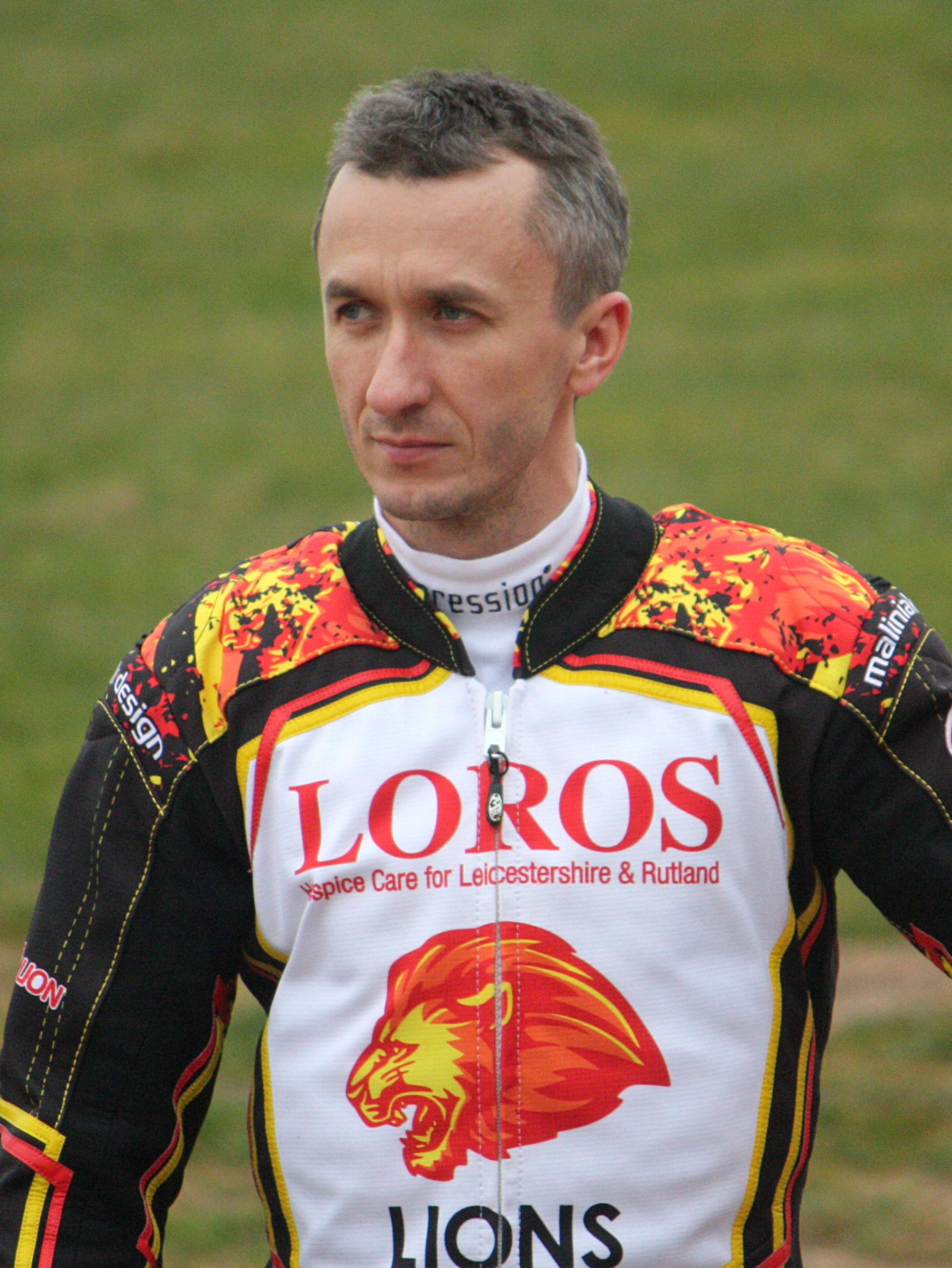
- Grzegorz Walasek, 2004 Polish champion

The 2004 Polish Speedway season was the 2004 season of motorcycle speedway in Poland.

== Individual ==
=== Polish Individual Speedway Championship ===
The 2004 Individual Speedway Polish Championship final was held on 15 August at Częstochowa.

Pos.	Rider	Club	Total	Points
1	Grzegorz Walasek	Częstochowa	13 +3	(3,3,1,3,3)
2	Jarosław Hampel	Wrocław	13 +2	(2,2,3,3,3)
3	Rune Holta	Częstochowa	12	(2,3,2,3,2)
4	Robert Kościecha	Gdańsk	11	(3,d,3,2,3)
5	Piotr Świst	Zielona Góra	10	(2,3,3,2,0)
6	Tomasz Gollob	Tarnów	9	(d,2,3,3,1)
7	Maciej Kuciapa	Rzeszów	8	(0,3,2,1,2)
8	Tomasz Chrzanowski	Gdańsk	7	(3,1,2,1,0)
9	Damian Baliński	Leszno	6	(w,2,1,0,3)
10	Piotr Protasiewicz	Toruń	6	(1,2,d,1,2)
11	Marcin Rempała	Tarnów	5	(2,d,2,1,0)
12	Mariusz Węgrzyk	Rybnik	5	(0,1,1,2,1)
13	Roman Chromik	Rybnik	4	(1,0,0,2,1)
14	Wiesław Jaguś	Toruń	4	(1,0,0,1,2)
15	Tomasz Gapiński (res)	Wrocław	3	(3)
16	Tomasz Jędrzejak	Ostrów Wlkp.	3	(1,1,1,0,0)
17	Piotr Paluch	Gorzów Wlkp.	1	(0,1,0,0,0)
18	Rafał Dobrucki (res)	Leszno	ns	

=== Golden Helmet ===
The 2004 Golden Golden Helmet (Polish: Turniej o Złoty Kask, ZK) organised by the Polish Motor Union (PZM) was the 2004 event for the league's leading riders. The final was held on the 9 October at Bydgoszcz.

Pos.	Rider	Club	Total	Points
1	Wiesław Jaguś	Toruń	13	(2,3,3,3,2)
2	Tomasz Gapiński	Wrocław	12	(3,2,1,3,3)
3	Grzegorz Walasek	Częstochowa	11 +3	(1,3,1,3,3)
4	Piotr Protasiewicz	Toruń	11 +2	(3,3,1,1,3)
5	Maciej Kuciapa	Rzeszów	10	(2,2,3,2,1)
6	Robert Miśkowiak	Wrocław	9	(3,1,0,2,3)
7	Jarosław Hampel	Wrocław	8	(0,2,3,3,0)
8	Krzysztof Kasprzak	Leszno	8	(0,1,3,2,2)
9	Adam Pietraszko	Opole	5	(0,3,2,0,0)
10	Robert Kościecha	Gdańsk	5	(3,0,w,1,1)
11	Paweł Hlib	Gorzów Wlkp.	5	(1,0,0,2,2)
12	Sebastian Ułamek	Częstochowa	5	(0,2,2,0,1)
13	Marcin Rempała	Tarnów	5	(2,d,2,1,0)
14	Tomasz Chrzanowski	Gdańsk	5	(2,1,1,1,0)
15	Jacek Krzyżaniak	Bydgoszcz	5	(1,1,2,d,1)
16	Piotr Rembas	Opole	2	(w,d,0,0,2)
17	Jacek Rempała (res)	Leszno	1	(1,0)

=== Junior Championship ===
- winner - Janusz Kołodziej

=== Silver Helmet ===
- winner - Adrian Miedziński

=== Bronze Helmet ===
- winner - Adrian Miedziński

== Pairs ==
=== Polish Pairs Speedway Championship ===
The 2004 Polish Pairs Speedway Championship was the 2004 edition of the Polish Pairs Speedway Championship. The final was held on 30 July at Toruń.

Pos	Team	Pts	Riders
1	Apator Toruń	26	Piotr Protasiewicz 11, Wiesław Jaguś 15
2	Unia Tarnów	21	Marcin Rempała 8, Janusz Kołodziej 1, Tomasz Gollob 12
3	Gdańsk	19	Tomasz Chrzanowski 12, Robert Kościecha 7
4	GTŻ Grudziądz	17	Mariusz Puszakowski 13, Łukasz Pawlikowski 3, Krzysztof Buczkowski 1
5	Rzeszów	16	Maciej Kuciapa 2, Karol Baran 11, Rafał Trojanowski 2
6	ZKŻ Zielona Góra	15	Piotr Świst 6, Andrzej Huszcza 5, Rafał Okoniewski 5
7	Włókniarz Częstochowa	9	Grzegorz Walasek 11, Sebastian Ułamek 0, Rafał Osumek 0

== Team ==
=== Team Speedway Polish Championship ===
The 2004 Team Speedway Polish Championship was the 2004 edition of the Team Polish Championship. Unia Tarnów won the gold medal for the first time in their history.

==== Ekstraliga ====
Pos	Team	P	W	D	L	Pts	Diff
1	Unia Tarnów	20	16	0	4	32	197
2	Atlas Wrocław	20	14	0	6	28	201
3	Włókniarz Częstochowa	20	12	0	8	24	128
4	Apator Toruń	20	8	1	11	17	12
5	Unia Leszno	20	8	2	10	18	36
6	Polonia Bydgoszcz	20	8	0	12	16	-146
7	ZKŻ Zielona Góra	20	7	0	13	14	-178
8	RKM Rybnik	20	5	1	14	11	-250

==== 1.Liga ====
Pos	Team	P	W	D	L	Diff	Pts
1	Wybrzeże Gdańsk	12	10	0	2	247	24
2	Stal Gorzów Wielkopolski	12	8	0	4	120	16
3	TŻ Lublin	12	8	0	4	30	16
4	Stal Rzeszów	12	6	1	5	10	13
5	GTŻ Grudziądz	12	5	1	6	11	11
6	Ostrów Wielkopolski	12	4	0	8	-60	8
7	Start Gniezno	12	0	0	12	-358	0

==== 2.Liga ====
Pos	Team	P	W	D	L	Diff	Pts
1	Kolejarz Opole	10	9	0	1	256	18
2	KSŻ Krosno	10	7	0	3	102	14
3	Kolejarz Rawicz	10	6	1	3	20	13
4	SKA-Speedway Lviv (Ukraine)	10	4	0	6	-85	8
5	Polonia Piła	10	3	1	6	-77	7
6	TŻ Łódź	10	0	0	10	-216	0

==== Promotion/relegation play offs ====
- Lublin - Zielona Góra 52–38, 31–59

Promotion/relegation additional round

Pos	Team	P	W	D	L	Diff	Pts
1	GTŻ Grudziądz	10	9	0	1	161	18
2	Ostrów Wielkopolski	10	8	1	1	156	17
3	Kolejarz Opole	10	5	1	4	45	11
4	KSŻ Krosno	10	3	0	7	-44	6
5	Kolejarz Rawicz	10	3	0	7	-116	6
6	Start Gniezno	10	1	0	9	-202	2
