= Sebastian Ułamek =

Polish speedway rider

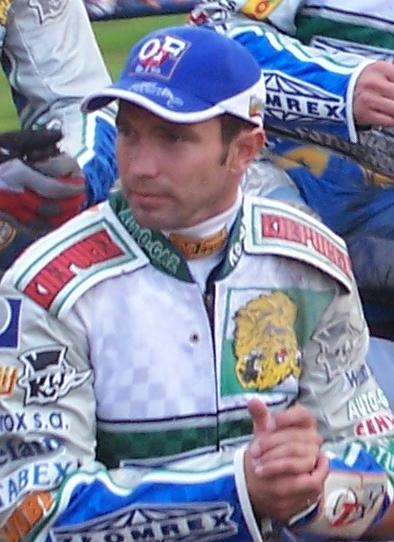
- Born: 20 November 1975 (age 51); Częstochowa, Poland
- Nationality: Polish

Career history

Poland
- 1992–1998, 2003–2008, 2016–2017: Częstochowa
- 1999–2000: Gdańsk
- 2001, 2012: Wrocław
- 2002: Leszno
- 2009–2011: Tarnów
- 2013: Gniezno
- 2014: Grudziądz
- 2015: Rybnik
- 2018: Opole

Great Britain
- 2000: Wolverhampton Wolves
- 2002: King's Lynn Stars
- 2003–2004: Oxford Cheetahs
- 2005: Coventry Bees
- 2006–2007: Swindon Robins
- 2012: Birmingham Brummies
- 2013: Lakeside Hammers
- 2016: Leicester Lions

Sweden
- 1998–2004: Team Svelux/Luxo Stars
- 2005–2007, 2011–2012: Västervik
- 2008–2009: Lejonen
- 2010: Valsarna

Denmark
- 2000–2001: Herning
- 2002: Vojens
- 2004: Holsted
- 2006: Fredericia
- 2008–2010, 2016: Fjelsted
- 2011: Esbjerg

Germany
- 2013: Wittstock
- 2014: Wolfslake

Speedway Grand Prix statistics
- SGP number: 14
- Starts: 30
- Finalist: 1 times

Individual honours
- 2001: Continental Champion
- 2010: European Champion

Team honours
- 2006: European Pairs Champion
- 2004: European Club Champions' Cup Winner
- 2006: Polish Pairs Championship

Sebastian Ułamek (born 20 November 1975) is a former motorcycle speedway rider from Poland. He was a European individual Champion and earned nine international caps for the Poland national speedway team.

== Career ==
Ułamek rode in the Polish leagues for his home club Włókniarz Częstochowa from 1992 until 1998 and then Gdańsk from 1999 to 2000 (the 2000 season was in the Ekstraliga). He began to establish himself as one of the leading riders and participated in his first Grand Prix series during the 1998 Speedway Grand Prix season.

Ułamek made his British league debut in 2000, when riding several times for Wolverhampton Wolves before returning to Poland to ride for Wrocław. On 12 August 2001, he won the Continental Final, which formed part of the 2002 Speedway Grand Prix Qualification. He also won a silver medal with Poland at the 2001 Speedway World Cup.

In 2002, in addition to his Swedish commitments, Ułamek rode for Leszno and returned to Britain to ride for the King's Lynn Stars. The following season in 2003, he joined the Oxford Cheetahs and returned to his home club Częstochowa. He continued to ride in the top division of three leagues and we won the European Pairs Speedway Championship for the first time in 2006.

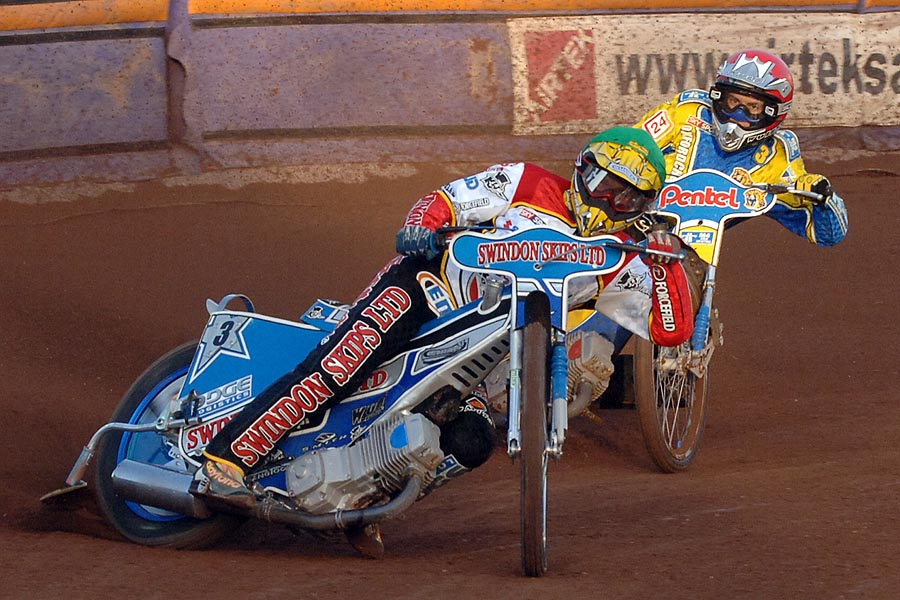
Ulamek riding for Swindon in 2007

Ulamek rode for Swindon Robins from 2006 to 2007 and a six consecutive season with Częstochowa in 2008. He would go on to win two more European Championship pairs in 2008 and 2015. He would also win the Individual Speedway European Championship in 2010.

Ułamek rode three more times in Britain for Birmingham Brummies in 2012, Lakeside Hammers in 2013 and Leicester Lions in 2017. His last season was in 2018, when he spent the season with Kolejarz Opole in the Polish Speedway Second League.

== Family ==
Born in Częstochowa, Poland, Sebastian Ułamek and his wife, Marzena (wedding in 2000), have two children, a son, Dawid and a daughter, Natalia .

== Speedway Grand Prix results ==
1998 Speedway Grand Prix Final Championship standings (Riding No 20)
Race no.	Grand Prix	Pos.	Pts.	Heats	Draw No

1999 Speedway Grand Prix Final Championship standings (Riding No 24)
Race no.	Grand Prix	Pos.	Pts.	Heats	Draw No

2000 Speedway Grand Prix Final Championship standings (Riding No 24)
Race no.	Grand Prix	Pos.	Pts.	Heats	Draw No

2002 Speedway Grand Prix Final Championship standings (Riding No 21)
Race no.	Grand Prix	Pos.	Pts.	Heats	Draw No

2003 Speedway Grand Prix Final Championship standings (Riding No )
Race no.	Grand Prix	Pos.	Pts.	Heats	Draw No

2007 Speedway Grand Prix Final Championship standings (Riding No 16)
Race no.	Grand Prix	Pos.	Pts.	Heats	Draw No
2 /11	(Europe) European SGP	9	6	(0,0,3,1,2)	4

permanent speedway rider
wild card, track reserve or qualified reserve
rider not classified (track reserve who did not start)

== Career details ==
=== World Championships ===
- Individual World Championship (Speedway Grand Prix)
  - 1998 - 24th place (10 points)
  - 1999 - 26th place (4 points)
  - 2000 - 28th place (6 points)
  - 2002 - 17th place (39 points)
  - 2003 - 32nd place (4 points)
  - 2007 - 21st place (6 points)
  - 2009 - 12th place (75 points)
- Individual U-21 World Championship
  - 1996 - 5th place (10 points)
- World Team Cup & Speedway World Cup
  - 1996 - 11th place (0 points in Group A as Poland B)
  - 2000 - 5th-6th place (4 points in Semi-Final A)
  - 2001 - 2nd place (13 points)
  - 2003 - 4th place (6 points)
  - 2006 - 5th place (8 points in Race-Off)

=== European Championships ===
- Individual European Championship
  - 2007 - (Austria) Wiener Neustadt - 2nd place (13 points)
  - 2008 - (Slovenia) Lendava - The Final will be on 2008-08-23
- European Pairs Championship
  - 2006 - European Champion (14 points)
- European Club Champions' Cup
  - 1998 - 3rd place (11 points)
  - 2001 - 2nd place (14+3 points)
  - 2004 - European Champion (14 points)

=== Domestic competitions ===
- Individual Polish Championship
  - 2001 - 3rd place
  - 2006 - 3rd place
  - 2009 - injury before the Semi-Final 2
- Polish Pairs Championship
  - 2006 - Polish Champion (15 points)
- Team Polish Championship
  - 1996 - Polish Champion
  - 1999 - 3rd place
  - 2001 - 2nd place
  - 2002 - 2nd place
  - 2003 - Polish Champion
  - 2004 - 3rd place
  - 2005 - 3rd place
  - 2006 - 2nd place
- British Elite League Pairs Championship
  - 2006 - 2nd place
- Golden Helmet
  - 1997 - 3rd place
  - 2000 - 2nd place
  - 2001 - 3rd place
  - 2006 - 2nd place
- Silver Helmet (U-21)
  - 1995 - 2nd place
- Mieczysław Połukard Criterium of Polish Speedway Leagues Aces
  - 1996 - 3rd place
  - 2006 - Winner

== See also ==
- List of Speedway Grand Prix riders
- Poland national speedway team
