= Paweł Staszek =

Polish speedway rider

- Born: 20 May 1976 (age 50); Lublin, Poland
- Nationality: Polish

Career history

Poland
- 1993–1995: Motor Lublin
- 1996–2002, 2003–2009, 2012: Grudziądz
- 2010: Krosno
- 2011: Piła
- 2013–2014: Krakow

Great Britain
- 2005: Oxford

Denmark
- 2006: Outrup

Paweł Staszek (born 20 May 1976) is a former speedway rider from Poland.

== Speedway career ==
Staszek rode in the Team Speedway Polish Championship for Motor Lublin, Grudziądz, Krosno, Piła and Krakow.

Staszek rode in the top tier of British Speedway riding for the Oxford Silver Machine during the 2005 Elite League speedway season.

Staszek reached the 1997 Individual Speedway Junior World Championship final.
