= Mariusz Puszakowski =

Polish speedway rider

- Born: 25 May 1978 (age 48); Golub-Dobrzyń, Poland
- Nationality: Polish

Career history

Poland
- 1997–1999, 2002, 2005–2006: Toruń
- 2000–2001, 2014–2016: Łódź
- 2003–2004, 2007–2008: Grudziądz
- 2009: Gniezno
- 2010–2011: Lublin
- 2012: Piła
- 2013: Rawicz
- 2017–2019: Krosno

Great Britain
- 2005: Ipswich
- 2006: Arena Essex

Denmark
- 2005–2006: Brovst
- 2011: Vojens

Mariusz Puszakowski (born 25 May 1978) is a Polish former motorcycle speedway rider.

== Speedway career ==
Puszakowski began his career in the Team Speedway Polish Championship riding for Toruń.

Puszakowski rode in the top tier of British Speedway riding for the Ipswich Witches during the 2005 Elite League speedway season and Arena Essex Hammers during the 2006 Elite League speedway season.

During the 2006 season, Puszakowski broke his leg in a league match, which resulted in his last season in Britain.

Puszakowski continued to ride in Poland until the end of the 2019 Polish speedway season.
