= Karol Baran =

Polish speedway rider

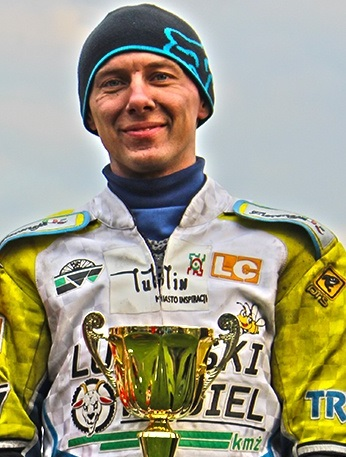
- Born: 16 August 1981 (age 45); Rzeszów, Poland
- Nationality: Polish

Career history

Poland
- 1999–2006, 2015–2016, 2018, 2021: Rzeszów
- 2007: Gdańsk
- 2008: Rybnik
- 2009–2013: Lublin
- 2014: Kraków
- 2017: Częstochowa
- 2019: Piła
- 2022: Opole

Great Britain
- 2005: Ipswich Witches
- 2009: Poole Pirates

Denmark
- 2004: Brovst

Karol Baran (born 16 August 1981) is a motorcycle speedway rider from Poland.

== Speedway career ==
Baran rode in the top tier of British Speedway riding for the Poole Pirates during the 2009 Elite League speedway season. He began his British career riding for Ipswich Witches in 2005.
