= Adrian Miedziński =

Polish speedway rider

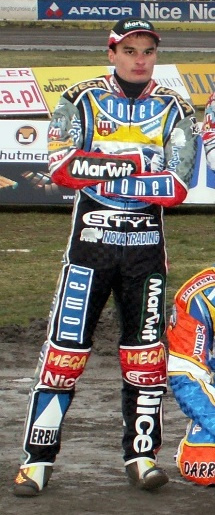
- Born: 20 August 1985 (age 41); Toruń, Poland
- Nationality: Polish

Career history

Poland
- 2001-2017, 2021: KS Toruń
- 2018-2019: Częstochowa
- 2020: Rybnik
- 2022, 2024: Bydgoszcz
- 2023: Leszno

Sweden
- 2008, 2017-2018: Indianerna
- 2009-2011, 2013-2014: Vargarna
- 2012: Hammarby
- 2016: Masarna
- 2019: Smederna
- 2021-2022: Rospiggarna

Great Britain
- 2004: Eastbourne
- 2006, 2015: Swindon
- 2007: Oxford
- 2012: Poole

Denmark
- 2004–2006: Slangerup
- 2009–2010: Brovst
- 2011: Esbjerg

Speedway Grand Prix statistics
- Starts: 6
- Podiums: 1 (1-0-0)
- Finalist: 1 times
- Winner: 1 times

Individual honours
- 2005: Individual U-21 Polish Champion
- 2013: Torun Grand Prix Champion

Team honours
- 2006: Team U-21 World Champion
- 2019: Elitserien

Adrian Miedziński (born 20 August 1985 in Toruń, Poland) is a motorcycle speedway rider from Poland. He earned four international caps for the Poland national speedway team.

== Career ==
Miedziński started riding in Poland during 2002 when he made his debut for KS Toruń, he would go on to ride 16 consecutive seasons of the club and all in the Ekstraliga.

In between, Miedziński made his British league debut for Eastbourne Eagles in 2004, won the Individual Speedway Junior Polish Championship (in 2005) and won the Team Speedway Junior World Championship (in 2006).

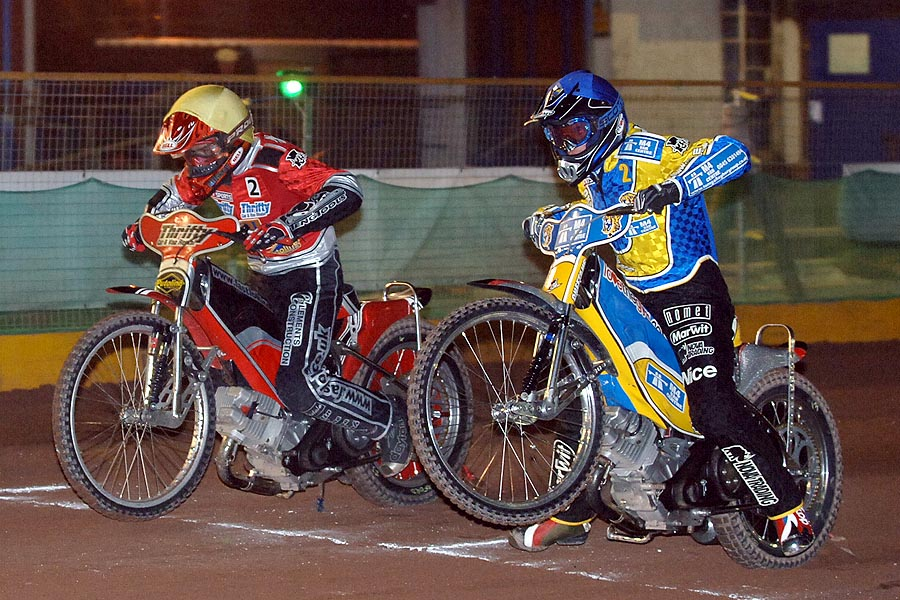
Miedziński riding for Oxford in 2007

After riding for the Swindon Robins in 2006, Miedziński joined the Oxford Cheetahs for the 2007 season but was left without a British club following Oxford's withdrawal from the league. He would not return to Britain again until 2012.

In 2013, Miedziński achieved his career best result after winning the Speedway Grand Prix of Poland during the 2013 Speedway Grand Prix series. In 2015, he signed for Swindon Robins for his second spell at the club.

Miedziński was part of the Smederna team that won the 2019 Elitserien in Sweden.

In 2022, while riding for Bydgoszcz, Miedziński suffered a serious crash which resulted in him being put into an induced coma due to brain and spinal injuries.

== Personal life ==
Miedziński's father, Stanisław was also a speedway rider.

== Major results ==
=== World individual Championship ===
- 2009 Speedway Grand Prix - =20th (6pts)
- 2010 Speedway Grand Prix - =20th (6pts)
- 2013 Speedway Grand Prix - 18th (15pts) including winning the Speedway Grand Prix of Poland
- 2014 Speedway Grand Prix - 19th (14pts)
- 2019 Speedway Grand Prix - =21st (4pts)

=== Speedway Grand Prix ===
2005 Speedway Grand Prix Final Championship standings (Riding No 18)
Race no.	Grand Prix	Pos.	Pts.	Heats	Draw No
1 /9	(Europe) European SGP	18	-	-	18

2007 Speedway Grand Prix Final Championship standings (Riding No 18)
Race no.	Grand Prix	Pos.	Pts.	Heats	Draw No
9 /11	(Poland) Polish SGP	18	-	-	18

permanent speedway rider
wild card, track reserve or qualified reserve
rider not classified (track reserve who did not start)

=== Other ===
- World Under-21 Championship
  - 2004 - 7th place (13 points + 4th in Semi-Final)
  - 2005 - 14th place (2 points)
  - 2006 - 6th place (8 points)
- Under-21 World Cup
  - 2006 - World Champion (8 points)
- Individual European Championship
  - 2006 - 6th place (8 points)
  - 2008 - 11th place (6 points)
- European Under-19 Championship
  - 2003 - 15th place (3 points)
  - 2004 - 13th place (5 points)
- European Pairs Championship
  - 2007 - 1st place in Semi-Final B (11 points)
- European Club Champions' Cup
  - 2009 - (Poland) Toruń - Runner-up (8 pts) Toruń
- Individual Under 21 Polish Championship
  - 2003 - 2nd place
  - 2005 - Polish Champion
- Golden Helmet
  - 2008 - Bronze medal
- Silver Helmet (U-21)
  - 2004 - Winner
- Bronze Helmet (U-19)
  - 2004 - Winner

== See also ==
- Poland national speedway team
