= Maciej Kuciapa =

Polish speedway rider

- Born: 23 November 1975 (age 50); Ropczyce, Poland
- Nationality: Polish

Career history

Poland
- 1992-2000, 2003-2007: Rzeszów
- 2001-2002: Zielona Góra
- 2008-: Rybnik

Sweden
- 2003: Lejonen

Team honours
- 2008: European Club Champion
- 2005: Polish Pairs Champion
- 1994, 1995: Team U-21 Polish Champion

Maciej Kuciapa (born 23 November 1975 in Ropczyce, Poland) is a former motorcycle speedway rider from Poland.

== Honours ==
- Individual European Championship:
  - 2007 - in Qualifying Round 3 was replaced by Marat Gatiatov
- European Club Champions' Cup:
  - 2006 - (Poland) Tarnów - bronze medal (5 pts) with Simon&Wolf Debrecen
  - 2008 - (Czech Republic) Slaný - Silver medal (7 pts)
  - 2009 - (Poland) Toruń 4th place (6 pts) for Simon & Wolf Debrecen
- Individual Polish Championship:
  - 2004 - 7th place
- Individual U-21 Polish Championship:
  - 1994 - 7th place
- Polish Pairs Championship
  - 2005 - Polish Champion
- Team Polish Championship:
  - 1998 - bronze medal
- Team U-21 Polish Championship:
  - 1994 - Polish Champion
  - 1995 - Polish Champion
  - 1996 - silver medal
- Golden Helmet:
  - 2004 - 5th place
- Silver Helmet U-21:
  - 1993 - 6th place

== See also ==
- Poland national speedway team
- Speedway in Poland
