= 2008 Team Speedway Junior Polish Championship =

Seasons
- ← 2007 2009 →

The 2008 Team Speedway Junior Polish Championship (Polish: Młodzieżowe Drużynowe Mistrzostwa Polski, MDMP) is the 2008 version of Team Speedway Junior Polish Championship organized by the Polish Motor Union (PZM). The Final took place on 4 September 2008 in Alfred Smoczyk Stadium in Leszno. Championship was won by Unia Leszno. They beat defending champions RKM Rybnik and Złomrex Włókniarz Częstochowa.

== Qualifications ==
=== Group A ===
Rank	Team	Points	Small
1	Unia Leszno	12	153
2	KM Ostrów Wlkp.	8	125
3	PSŻ Poznań	7	106
4	Unibax Toruń	2	55
5	Start Gniezno	1	36

=== Group B ===
Rank	Team	Points	Small
1	ZKŻ Kronopol Zielona Góra	11.5	126
2	GTŻ Grudziądz	7	89
3	Stal Gorzów Wlkp.	6.5	85
4	Wybrzeże Gdańsk	3	73
5	Polonia Bydgoszcz	2	71

=== Group C ===
Rank	Team	Points	Small
1	RKM Rybnik	12	151
2	Złomrex Włókniarz Częstochowa	9	119
3	Unia Tarnów	5.5	78
4	Marma Rzeszów	2.5	66
5	KSM Krosno	1	36

== Final ==
- XXIX. The Final
- 4 September 2008
- (Poland) Leszno, Alfred Smoczyk Stadium

Placing	Team / Rider name	Total	1	2	3	4	5	6	7	8	9	10	11	12	13	14	15	16	Pts	17	18	19	20
1	Unia Leszno	46	3	4	7	10	13	15	16	18	21	24	25	27	30	33	36	36		38	40	43	46
1	(1) Sławomir Musielak	9				3				2				2				Fx	7	2
1	(2) Adam Kajoch	10			3				1				1				3		8		2
1	(3) Robert Kasprzak	12		1				2				3			3				9			3
1	(4) Przemysław Pawlicki	15	3				3				3					3			12				3
1	(17) Paweł Ratajszczak	0																	0
2	RKM Rybnik	31	2	4	6	7	8	9	9	12	14	16	18	21	22	24	26	27		30	30	31	31
2	(9) Patryk Pawlaszczyk	6			2		1					2						1	6			-
2	(10) Sławomir Pyszny	6				1		1			2						2		6		0
2	(11) Rafał Fleger	9		2						3			2			2			9				0
2	(12) Paweł Paliga	0	-						Fx					-	-				0	-
2	(19) Michał Mitko	10	2											3	1				6	3		1
3	Złomrex Włókniarz Częstochowa	22	0	3	4	4	6	6	9	10	11	11	11	11	13	13	14	17		18	21	21	22
3	(13) Mateusz Szczepaniak	11		3					3		1							3	10				1
3	(14) Mateusz Kowalczyk	5	0							1		0					1		2		3
3	(15) Kamil Cieślar	2			1			0						0		0			1	1
3	(16) Marcin Piekarski	4				0	2						0		2				4			0
3	(20) Adrian Osmólski	0																	0
4	ZKŻ Kronopol Zielona Góra	21	1	1	1	3	3	6	8	8	8	9	12	13	13	14	14	16		16	17	19	21
4	(5) Grzegorz Zengota	11	1					3					3					2	9				2
4	(6) Janusz Baniak	2		X			0							1			F3		1		1
4	(7) Patryk Dudek	8				2			2			1				1			6			2
4	(8) Tomasz Halicki	0			0					Fx	0				0				0	0
Placing	Team / Rider name	Total	1	2	3	4	5	6	7	8	9	10	11	12	13	14	15	16	Pts	17	18	19	20

M - exclusion for exceeding two-minute time allowance • T - exclusion for touching the tapes • X - other exclusion • E - retired or mechanical failure • F - fell

Helmet colours were permanent for each team (Red, Blue, White and Yellow/Black). Colours in diagrams indicate gate positions:
gate A – inside	gate B	gate C	gate D – outside

== See also ==
- 2008 Individual Speedway Junior Polish Championship
- 2008 Team Speedway Polish Championship (2008 Speedway Ekstraliga)
