= 2008 Speedway Ekstraliga =

Seasons
- ← 2007 2009 →

The 2008 Speedway Ekstraliga season is the 9th since its establishment. The first fixtures of the season are scheduled for April 6, 2008, and the season will end on October 19, 2008. Unia Leszno are the defending Polish champions. The Speedway Ekstraliga (pl. Ekstraliga żużlowa) is the top division of speedway in the Poland.

The 2008 Juniors League (pl. Liga Juniorów) season is the first its establishment. Every Ekstraliga team must send a Team U-21 to youth league. Eight events will be on July and August.

== Teams ==

Club	Nickname	'07 Pos.	Ekstraliga since
Złomrex Włókniarz Częstochowa	Lions	6	2000
Stal Gorzów Wlkp.		1*	2008
Unia Leszno	Bulls	1	1997
Marma Polskie Folie Rzeszów	Cranes	3	2006
Unia Tarnów	Swallows	6	2004
Unibax Toruń	Angels	2	1976*
Atlas Wrocław		5	1999
ZKŻ Kronopol Zielona Góra	Mickey Mouse	7	2007

- Toruń - have never been relegated to a lower division.
- Gorzów Wlkp. - 1st in First League.

=== Squad of Teams ===
2008 Speedway Grand Prix rider

Częstochowa
Rider	Age	Average
(Denmark) Nicki Pedersen	31	2.730
(United States) Greg Hancock	38	2.207
(Poland) Tomasz Gapiński	26	1.625
(Poland) Sebastian Ułamek	32	1.622
(United Kingdom) Lee Richardson	29	1.662
(Poland) Michał Szczepaniak	25	1.400
(Poland) Mateusz Szczepaniak	21	1.391
(Poland) Sławomir Drabik	42	1.366
(Sweden) Antonio Lindbäck	23	1.357
(United Kingdom) Edward Kennett	22	1.300
(Poland) Borys Miturski	19	1.250
(United Kingdom) Lewis Bridger	19	0.333
(Poland) Marcin Piekarski	19	0.000
(Poland) Mateusz Kowalczyk	19	0.822 (2)
(Poland) Przemysław Dądela	23	0.556 (2)
(United Kingdom) James Courtney	20	N
(Poland) Kamil Mistygacz	19	N
(Poland) Damian Romańczuk	20	N
(Australia) (United Kingdom) Tai Woffinden	18	N

Gorzów Wlkp.
Rider	Age	Average
(Poland) Tomasz Gollob	37	2.310
(Norway) (Poland) Rune Holta	35	2.195
(Sweden) Peter Karlsson	39	2.300 (1)
(Poland) Paweł Hlib	22	2.247 (1)
(Denmark) Jesper B. Monberg	31	2.247 (1)
(Slovenia) Matej Ferjan	31	2.245 (1)
(Sweden) Thomas H. Jonasson	20	1.596 (1)
(Denmark) Kenneth Hansen	21	1.125 (1)
(Poland) Adrian Szewczykowski	19	0.900 (1)
(Poland) Paweł Zmarzlik	18	0.000
(Finland) Jari Maekinen	18	N
(Poland) Mateusz Mikorski	19	N

Leszno
Rider	Age	Average
(Australia) Leigh Adams	37	2.635
(Poland) Krzysztof Kasprzak	24	2.160
(Poland) Jarosław Hampel	26	2.093
(Poland) Damian Baliński	31	1.979
(Australia) Troy Batchelor	21	1.509
(Croatia) Jurica Pavlič	19	1.000
(Poland) Adam Kajoch	20	0.857
(Poland) Robert Kasprzak	21	0.810
(Australia) Travis McGowan	27	0.000
(Poland) Sławomir Musielak	18	N
(Poland) Damian Perz	20	N
(Australia) Adam Shields	31	N

Rzeszów
Rider	Age	Average
(United Kingdom) Scott Nicholls	30	1.950
(Denmark) Kenneth Bjerre	24	1.926
(Australia) Davey Watt	30	1.824
(Slovenia) Matej Žagar	25	1.488
(Poland) Dawid Lampart	18	0.533
(Poland) Mateusz Szostek	19	0.500
(Russia) (Poland) Roman Povazhny	32	1.691 (1)
(Poland) Rafał Klimek	18	0.813 (1)
(Slovakia) (Poland) Martin Vaculík	18	2.259 (2)
(Australia) Cameron Woodward	23	N
(Poland) Piotr Winiarz	32	N

Tarnów
Rider	Age	Average
(Poland) Janusz Kołodziej	24	1.859
(Sweden) Peter Ljung	26	1.524
(Poland) Krystian Klecha	24	1.511
(Czech Republic) Aleš Dryml, Jr.	29	1.054
(Denmark) Patrick Hougaard	19	1.000
(Poland) Jacek Rempała	37	0.947
(Russia) Daniil Ivanov	22	0.818
(Poland) Kamil Zieliński	21	0.824
(Poland) Marcin Rempała	24	0.387
(Poland) Szymon Kiełbasa	19	0.000
(Germany) Tobias Busch	20	1.591 (2)
(United Kingdom) Steve Boxall	21	N
(Poland) Maciej Ciesielski	21	N
(Australia) Kevin Doolan	28	N
(Poland) Łukasz Kiełbasa	19	N
(Poland) Tadeusz Kostro	17	N
(Denmark) Peter Juul Larsen	18	N
(United Kingdom) James Wright	22	N

Toruń
Rider	Age	Average
(Denmark) Hans N. Andersen	28	2.194
(Australia) Ryan Sullivan	33	2.220
(Poland) Wiesław Jaguś	33	2.161
(Poland) Karol Ząbik	22	1.989
(Poland) Robert Kościecha	31	1.750
(Poland) Adrian Miedziński	23	1.699
(Australia) Chris Holder	21	1.677
(Poland) Adam Wiśniewski	18	0.500
(Poland) Damian Celmer	19	0.000
(Australia) (Poland) Robert Ksiezak	21	N
(Poland) Mateusz Lampkowski	18	N
(Poland) Łukasz Lipiński	19	N
(Poland) Marcin Nowakowski	19	N
(Poland) Oskar Pieniążek	19	N

Wrocław
Rider	Age	Average
(Australia) Jason Crump	33	2.292
(Canada) (Poland) Krzysztof Słaboń	27	1.587
(Poland) Tomasz Jędrzejak	29	1.571
(Czech Republic) Filip Šitera	20	1.400
(Poland) Maciej Janowski	17	0.429
(Poland) Daniel Jeleniewski	25	2.181 (1)
(Sweden) Mikael Max	35	2.096 (1)
(United Kingdom) (Poland) Andy Smith	42	2.000 (1)
(Australia) Rory Schlein	24	1.811 (1)
(Poland) Mariusz Węgrzyk	29	1.667 (1)
(United Kingdom) Benjamin Barker	20	N
(Denmark) Leon Madsen	20	N
(Poland) Marcin Podlaszewski	17	N

Zielona Góra
Rider	Age	Average
(Poland) Grzegorz Walasek	32	2.048
(Poland) Piotr Protasiewicz	33	2.012
(Denmark) Niels Kristian Iversen	26	1.837
(Sweden) Fredrik Lindgren	23	1.770
(Poland) Rafał Dobrucki	32	1.689
(Poland) Mariusz Staszewski	33	1.357
(Poland) Grzegorz Zengota	20	0.946
(Sweden) Ricky Kling	21	0.905
(Denmark) Nicolai Klindt	20	0.800
(Denmark) Charlie Gjedde	29	1.747 (1)
(Poland) Sławomir Dudek	40	1.579 (2)
(Poland) Janusz Baniak	19	N
(Poland) Paweł Gwóźdź	19	N
(Russia) Aleksandr Koslopakin	21	N
(Poland) Adam Kulczyński	22	N
(Sweden) Ludvig Lindgren	18	N
(Russia) Artem Vodyakov	17	N
(Poland) Przemysław Zarzycki	20	N

== First round ==
=== League table ===
Play-offs 1st-6th
Play-offs 7th-8th
M	Matches played
W	Matches won
D	Matches drawn
L	Matches lost
Pts	Points
Bon	Bonus points
Total	Total points
F	Small Points for
A	Small Points against

Pos	Club	M	W	D	L	Pts	Bon	Total	+/-
1	Złomrex Włókniarz Częstochowa	14	12	0	2	24	7	31	+253
2	Unibax Toruń	14	12	0	2	24	6	30	+199
3	Unia Leszno	14	10	1	3	21	4	25	+162
4	ZKŻ Kronopol Zielona Góra	14	7	0	7	14	3	17	-7
5	Caelum Stal Gorzów Wlkp.	14	6	1	7	13	3	16	-36
6	Atlas Wrocław	14	4	0	10	8	4	12	-36
7	Marma Polskie Folie Rzeszów	14	3	0	11	6	1	7	-255
8	Unia Tarnów	14	1	0	13	2	-	2	-280
Pos	Club	M	W	D	L	Pts	Bon	Total	+/-

=== Results ===
The home team is listed in the left-hand column. Blue indicates a win to the home team while a red represents a loss to the home team.

	CZE	GOR	LES	RZE	TAR	TOR	WRO	ZIE
Włókniarz Częstochowa	x	55:38	56:36	65:26	69:23	41:50	60:33	49:41
Stal Gorzów Wlkp.	40:50	x	48:42	51:41	60:32	43:47	53:40	41:49
Unia Leszno	50:42	45:45	x	59:33	67:26	43:47	61:29	50:40
Marma Rzeszów	32:60	44:48	27:65	x	51:37	33:58	47:43	33:59
Unia Tarnów	33:59	46:47	40:53	44:47	x	38:53	57:36	41:49
Unibax Toruń	34:59	61:30	44:46	63:28	66:26	x	49:41	56:34
Atlas Wrocław	40:50	53:39	46:47	62:30	61:29	41:48	x	53:40
Kronopol Zielona Góra	38:52	53:39	36:57	52:39	63:29	32:58	47:43	x

== Play-offs ==
=== Quarter-finals ===
Quarter-Final 1-6 place		Złomrex Włókniarz Częstochowa 1st in First Round	113:71	Atlas Wrocław 6th in First Round
Quarter-Final 1-6 place	Aug 31	Częstochowa	53:39	Wrocław
Quarter-Final 1-6 place	Sep 1	Wrocław	32:60	Częstochowa
Quarter-Final 1-6 place		Unibax Toruń 2nd in First Round	113:68	Caelum Stal Gorzów Wlkp. 5th in First Round
Quarter-Final 1-6 place	Aug 24	Gorzów Wlkp.	43:47	Toruń
Quarter-Final 1-6 place	Aug 31	Toruń	66:25	Gorzów Wlkp.
Quarter-Final 1-6 place		Unia Leszno 3rd in First Round	94:87	ZKŻ Kronopol Zielona Góra 4th in First Round
Quarter-Final 1-6 place	Aug 28	Zielona Góra	49:40	Leszno
Quarter-Final 1-6 place	Aug 31	Leszno	54:38	Zielona Góra

Table

Winners
Pos	Club	Pts	Small points
1A	Toruń	4	113
2A	Częstochowa	4	113
3A	Leszno	2	94

Losers
Pos	Club	Pts	Small points
1B	Zielona Góra	2	87
2B	Wrocław	0	71
3B	Gorzów Wlkp.	0	68

To Semi-Finals

=== Semi-finals ===
Semi-Final 1-4 place		Unibax Toruń 1A in quarter-final		ZKŻ Kronopol Zielona Góra 1B in quarter-final
Semi-Final 1-4 place	Sep 7	Zielona Góra	48:42	Toruń
Semi-Final 1-4 place	Sep 19	Toruń		Zielona Góra
Semi-Final 1-4 place		Złomrex Włókniarz Częstochowa 2A in quarter-final		Unia Leszno 3A in quarter-final
Semi-Final 1-4 place	Sep 7	Leszno	52:41	Częstochowa
Semi-Final 1-4 place	Sep 19	Częstochowa		Leszno

=== Finals ===
Final 1-2 place		Semi-Final Winner		Semi-Final Winner
Final 1-2 place	Sep 28			
Final 1-2 place	Oct 19			
3-4 place		Semi-Final Loser		Semi-Final Loser
3-4 place	Oct 3 or 5			
3-4 place	Oct 12			
7-8 place		Marma Polskie Folie Rzeszów 7th in First Round		Unia Tarnów 8th in First Round
7-8 place	Sep 7	Tarnów	42:48	Rzeszów
7-8 place	Sep 28	Rzeszów		Tarnów

== Final classification ==
Pos	Club
1	Unibax Torun
2
3
4
5
6
7	Relegation playoffs
8	Relegated to First League

== Relegation playoffs ==
Relegation play-off		7th in Ekstraliga	2nd in First League
Relegation play-off	Oct 12		
Relegation play-off	Oct 19		

== Juniors League ==
Pos.	Team	Points	Small Pts	Jul 1 TAR	Jul 2 RZE	Jul 15 GOR	Jul 16 ZIE	Jul 29 LES	Jul 30 WRO	Aug 12 TOR	Aug 13 CZE
1	Unia Leszno	36.0	165	4.5 (23)	3 (16)	6 (26)	6 (28)	5.5 (23)	6 (24)	-	5 (25)
2	Marma Rzeszów	28.5	153	6 (27)	6 (28)	4.5 (20)	-	0 (11)	0 (12)	6 (28)	6 (27)
3	Atlas Wrocław	24.0	121	4.5 (23)	4 (18)	0.5 (13)	4 (18)	5.5 (23)	3 (20)	2.5 (16)	-
4	Kronopol Zielona Góra	23.0	130	-	0.5 (14)	4.5 (20)	5 (25)	4 (20)	5 (22)	1 (12)	3 (17)
5	Stal Gorzów Wlkp.	20.0	113	0 (6)	-	3 (17)	3 (16)	3 (19)	3 (14)	5 (21)	4 (20)
6	Unia Tarnów	14.5	110	2 (16)	0.5 (14)	-	1 (13)	2 (15)	4 (21)	4 (17)	1 (14)
7	Włókniarz Częstochowa	11.5	110	3 (19)	5 (21)	0.5 (13)	0 (11)	-	1 (13)	0 (8)	2 (15)
8	Unibax Toruń	10.5	94	1 (12)	2 (15)	2 (15)	2 (15)	1 (13)	-	2.5 (16)	0 (8)
Details											

== See also ==
- Speedway in Poland
