= 2009 Silver Helmet (Poland) =

The 2009 Silver Helmet (Polish: Turniej o Srebrny Kask, BK) is the 2009 version of Silver Helmet organized by the Polish Motor Union (PZM). The final took place on 25 September in Częstochowa and was won by Grzegorz Zengota (Falubaz Zielona Góra).

== Semi-final ==
=== Rzeszów ===
- Semi-final 1
- 6 August 2009
- Rzeszów
- Referee: Tomasz Proszowski (Tarnów)
- Attendance: 500
- Best time: 65.85 – Maciej Janowski in heat 7
- Qualify to the final: 8 + one reserve
- Changes:

(2) Patryk Pawlaszczyk (OST) → (17) Piekarski
(4) Emil Idziorek (OST) → None
(18) Maciej Michaluk (LUB) → None
(19) Piotr Machnik (KRO) → None
(20) Mateusz Łukaszewski (LES) → None

Pos.	Rider	Points	Details
1	(11) Maciej Janowski (WRO)	13	(1,3,3,3,3)
2	(15) Przemysław Pawlicki (LES)	13	(3,1,3,3,3)
3	(9) Szymon Kiełbasa (TAR)	12	(2,2,3,2,3)
4	(3) Dawid Lampart (RZE)	12	(2,2,2,3,3)
5	(13) Sławomir Musielak (LES)	11	(1,3,3,2,2)
6	(10) Sławomir Pyszny (RYB)	11	(3,3,2,1,2)
7	(12) Rafał Fleger (RYB)	9	(R4,3,2,3,1)
8	(2) Marcin Piekarski (CZE)	9	(3,2,1,1,2)
9	(1) Mateusz Szostek (RZE)	6+3	(1,1,1,2,1)
10	(14) Grzegorz Stróżyk (POZ)	6+2	(2,1,F3,1,2)
11	(8) Rafał Klimek (LUB)	5	(3,1,1,0,N)
12	(16) Adam Kajoch (POZ)	5	(0,2,0,2,1)
13	(7) Mateusz Mikorski (GOR)	3	(2,R4,1,R4,R4)
14	(6) Mateusz Kowalczyk (KRO)	3	(Fx,0,2,1,0)
15	(5) Łukasz Cyran (GOR)	0	(Fx,N,N,N,N)

=== Grudziądz ===
- Semi-final 2
- 5 August 2009
- Grudziądz
- Referee: Grzegorz Sokołowski
- Attendance: 400
- Qualify to the Final: 8 + one reserve

Pos.	Rider	Points	Details
1	(1) Artur Mroczka (GRU)	15	(3,3,3,3,3)
2	(3) Borys Miturski (CZE)	12	(1,3,3,2,3)
3	(4) Paweł Zmarzlik (GOR)	12	(2,3,2,2,3)
4	(13) Patryk Dudek (ZIE)	11	(3,1,3,3,1)
5	(11) Michał Mitko (RYB)	10	(3,2,1,2,2)
6	(8) Maciej Piaszczyński (ŁÓD)	9	(3,2,1,1,2)
7	(12) Damian Sperz (GDA)	9	(2,1,3,1,2)
8	(15) Grzegorz Zengota (ZIE)	8	(2,M/-,2,3,1)
9	(7) Damian Celmer (TOR)	7	(2,F1,R,2,3)
10	(10) Cyprian Szymko (GDA)	6	(1,1,1,3,R4)
11	(14) Kacper Gomólski (GNI)	5	(0,3,2,Fx,-)
12	(2) Adrian Szewczykowski (GOR)	3	(0,2,0,0,1)
13	(5) Mateusz Lampkowski (TOR)	3	(Fx,2,1,Fx,0)
14	(16) Szymon Woźniak (BYD)	3	(1,0,F,Fx,2)
15	(6) Michał Łopaczewski (PIŁ)	3	(1,0,2,Fx,-)
16	(18) Emil Pulczyński (TOR)	2	(1,0,1)
17	(9) Kamil Fleger (RYB)	0	(T/-,0,0,-,-)
18	(17) Janusz Baniak (ZIE)	0	(R,X,0)
—	(19) Mateusz Łukowiak (ZIE)	—	—
—	(20) Kamil Pulczyński (TOR)	—	—

No. 17 rode in Heat 3 (replaced No. 9), 16 (9), 19 (6)
No. 18 rode in Heat 7 (15), 18 (9), 20 (14)

== The final ==
- 25 September 2009 (18:00 UTC+2)
- Częstochowa
- Referee: Józef Piekarski (Toruń)
- Change:

(10) injury Przemysław Pawlicki (LES) → reserve no. 17

Placing	Rider	Total	1	2	3	4	5	6	7	8	9	10	11	12	13	14	15	16	17	18	19	20	Pts	Pos	21
1	(13) Grzegorz Zengota (ZIE)	14				3	2							3		3					3		14	1	
2	(14) Maciej Janowski (WRO)	12				2		3					3		3							1	12	2	3
3	(4) Sławomir Musielak (LES)	12	2							3				2				3				2	12	3	2
4	(1) Dawid Lampart (RZE)	11	1				3				2				2				3				11	4	
5	(2) Patryk Dudek (ZIE)	10	0					2				3				2				3			10	5	
6	(3) Szymon Kiełbasa (TAR)	9	3						2				2				2				F2x		9	6	
7	(5) Artur Mroczka (GRU)	9		3			1					2					0					3	9	7	
8	(10) Sławomir Pyszny (RYB)	8			2			1						0			3		2				8	8	
9	(11) Paweł Zmarzlik (GOR)	6			1				1		3					1						0	6	9	
10	(12) Mateusz Szostek (RZE)	6			3					1		Fx			1						1		6	10	
11	(9) Borys Miturski (CZE)	5			R3		0						1					2		2			5	11	
12	(6) Michał Mitko (RYB)	4		2				0			R4							0			2		4	12	
14	(16) Marcin Piekarski (CZE)	4				0				2	1						1			F2x			4	14	
15	(7) Rafał Fleger (RYB)	3		X					2					1	R3					-			3	15	
15	(15) Damian Sperz (GDA)	3				1			0			1						1	F3x				3	15	
16	(8) Maciej Piaszczyński (ŁÓD)	1		1						0			0			-			-				1	16	
17	(17) Damian Celmer (TOR)	0														R			X	N			0	17	
Placing	Rider	Total	1	2	3	4	5	6	7	8	9	10	11	12	13	14	15	16	17	18	19	20	Pts	Pos	21

m - exclusion for exceeding two minute time allowance • t - exclusion for touching the tapes • x - other exclusion • e - retired or mechanical failure • f - fell • ns - non-starter • nc - non-classify

gate A - inside	gate B	gate C	gate D - outside
