= Przemysław Pawlicki =

Polish speedway rider

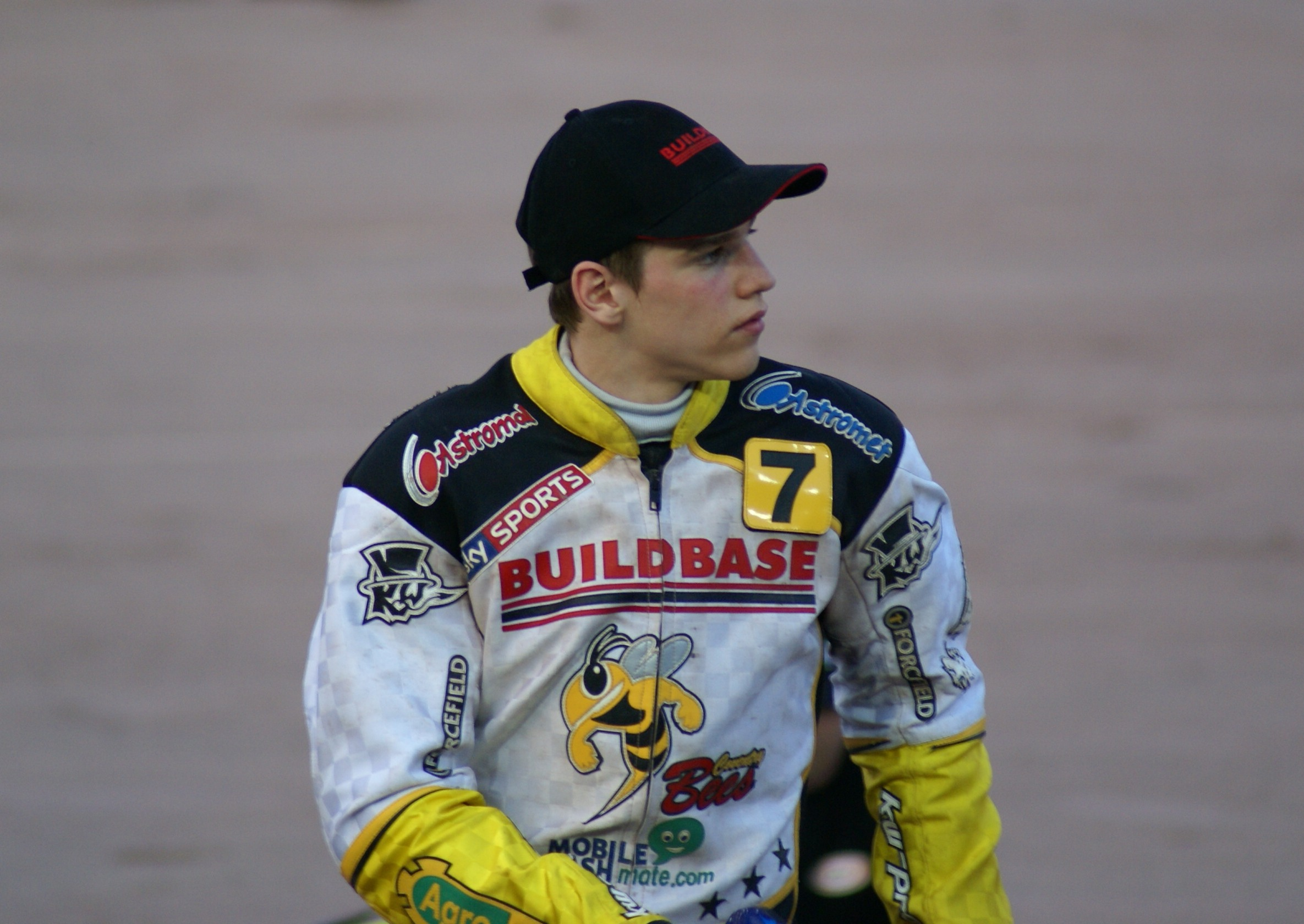
- Born: 5 September 1991 (age 35)
- Nationality: Polish
- Website: Official website

Career history

Poland
- 2008–2009, 2011–2015: Leszno
- 2010, 2016–2017: Gorzów
- 2018–2022: Grudziądz
- 2023–2026: Zielona Góra

Great Britain
- 2010–2011: Coventry
- 2013, 2014: Poole

Sweden
- 2011–2013, 2023–2025: Piraterna
- 2014: Västervik
- 2015, 2019: Smederna
- 2016–2018, 2020–2022: Masarna
- 2026: Indianerna

Denmark
- 2012: Holsted
- 2013: Holstebro
- 2016–2018, 2023–2026: Grindsted

Germany
- 2009: AC Landshut
- 2013: Stralsund

Speedway Grand Prix statistics
- Starts: 13
- Podiums: 0 (0-0-0)
- Finalist: 0 times
- Winner: 0 times

Individual honours
- 2017: GP Challenge winner
- 2011: World U-21 bronze medal
- 2009: European Junior champion
- 2014, 2015, 2017: Golden Helmet winner
- 2011, 2017: Polish Championship silver medal

Team honours
- 2015: Speedway World Cup bronze medal
- 2024, 2025: European Team champion
- 2023: European Pairs champion
- 2009, 2012: World Team Junior champion
- 2009, 2010: European Junior Champion
- 2008: Team U-21 Polish Champion
- 2010, 2014: Elite League Winner
- 2011, 2013, 2019, 2020: Elitserien Winner
- 2015, 2016: Ekstraliga Winner

Przemysław Pawlicki (born 5 September 1991) is a motorcycle speedway rider from Poland.

== Career ==
Pawlicki passed his speedway license (Licencja "Ż") in 2008, as a 16-year-old. On 20 July 2008, he rode in his first meeting in the Polish Speedway Ekstraliga, representing Unia Leszno and scoring 11 points. In total he rode in 20 heats (five meetings) and scored 31 points and three bonus points (averaging 1.700). He participated in the Team Under-21 Polish Championship for Leszno, at the Alfred Smoczyk Stadium. Pawlicki scored a maximum 15 points and was the fastest rider in the meeting (60.6 secs in Heat 5) as Leszno won the event. In total, he scored 51 points in 21 heats (averaging 2.429). Leszno won the Under-21 Speedway Ekstraliga (Liga Juniorów) and Pawlicki finished third in the Ekstraliga U-21 Individual Championship (13 points and second in Run-Off).

In the Polish Pairs Under-21 Championship final, Pawlicki scored 13 points, with Leszno finishing fifth and was fourth in the Individual Under-21 Polish Championship, scoring 11 points. Weekly "Tygodnik Żużlowy" (Speedway Weekly) awarded him as Revelation of the Year. Speedway chapter of Main Commission of Speedway Sport (part of the Polish Motor Union) awarded him and Maciej Janowski for one of the best debut seasons in Polish speedway history.

In 2009, Pawlicki again rode for Unia Leszno and made his debut in the Individual Polish Championship. He also rode in the German Bundesliga for AC Landshut, winning the league final. On 11 July, he won the Individual U-19 European Championship Final and later Pawlicki helped the Polish U21 team win the Team U-19 European Championship Final and successfully defend their World Championship title at Under-21 Speedway World Cup. Pawlicki finishing Poland's top scorer with a maximum 15 points. His season finished early after a crash during a Junior meeting in Gorzów Wielkopolski.

In 2010, Pawlicki's left Unia Leszno to join Caelum Stal Gorzów for the 2010 Speedway Ekstraliga. He also made his British, Swedish and Danish league debuts, riding for Coventry Bees in the Elite League, Rospiggarna Hallstavik in the Swedish Elitserien and Holsted Tigers in the Danish Superliga. He was instrumental in helping Coventry win the Elite League Title, beating Poole 101-79 in the two leg play-off final. He competed as a wild card" for the 2010 Under-21 World Championship.

In 2011, Pawlicki won the bronze medal at the 2011 Speedway Under-21 World Championship and finished second in the Polish Individual Speedway Championship. In 2015, he won a bronze medal at the Speedway World Cup.

In August 2017, during the Speedway Grand Prix Qualification, Pawlicki won the GP Challenge, which ensured that he claimed a permanent slot for the 2018 Speedway Grand Prix. He also finished runner-up again in the Polish Individual Speedway Championship.

In 2023, Pawlicki signed for Piraterna in the Swedish Elitserien. In October 2023, he paired up with Szymon Woźniak to become the European Pairs champion.

In 2024, Pawlicki won the European Team Speedway Championship.

== Personal life ==
Pawlicki's father Piotr Pawlicki, Sr. (born 31 July 1963) was also a speedway rider. Przemysław's brother Piotr Pawlicki, Jr. (born 30 November 1994) is also a professional rider.

== Major results ==
=== World Championships ===
Grand Prix

- 2010 Speedway Grand Prix 34th (0 pts)
- 2012 Speedway Grand Prix 25th (7 pts)
- 2017 Speedway Grand Prix 29th (3 pts)
- 2018 Speedway Grand Prix 15th (36 pts)

World team championships

- 2015 Speedway World Cup (bronze medal)

Junior World Championship

- 2009 - World Champion (15 pts)

Junior Team Championship

- 2009 - Winner (57 pts)
- 2010 - bronze medal (35 pts)
- 2011 - 5th
- 2012 - Winner (61 pts)

=== European Championships ===
- Individual U-19 European Championship
  - 2009 - (Poland) Tarnów - European Champion (14 pts)
  - 2010 - (Croatia) Goričan - Runner-up (14+2 pts)
  - 2010 - (Czech Republic) Divišov - U-19 European Champion (14 pts)
- Team U-19 European Championship
  - 2009 - (Denmark) Holsted - U-19 European Champion (15 pts)
- European Club Champions' Cup
  - 2008 - 4th place in Semi-Final

=== Domestic competitions ===
- Individual Polish Championship
  - 2009 - 9th place in Quarter-Final 2
- Individual U-21 Polish Championship
  - 2008 - (Poland) Rybnik - 4th place (11 ps)
  - 2009 - (Poland) Leszno - 5th place (9 pts)
- Polish Pairs Junior Championship
  - 2009 - (Poland) Rybnik - U-21 Polish Champion (17 pts)
- Team Polish Championship (League)
  - 2008 - Runner-up for Leszno
- Team U-21 Polish Championship
  - 2008 - (Poland) Leszno - U-21 Polish Champion for Leszno (15 pts)
  - 2009 - (Poland) Toruń - 3rd place (12 pts)
- Individual Championship of U-21 Speedway Ekstraliga
  - 2008 - (Poland) Leszno - 3rd place (13+2 pts)
- U-21 Speedway Ekstraliga
  - 2008 - Winner for Leszno
  - 2009 - Winner for Leszno
- Polish Silver Helmet (U-21)
  - 2008 - (Poland) Rzeszów - qualify to the Final, but he was injury
  - 2009 - (Poland) Częstochowa - qualify to the Final, but he was injury
- Polish Bronze Helmet (U-19)
  - 2008 - (Poland) Gdańsk - qualify to the Final as track reserve, but he was injury
  - 2009 - (Poland) Wrocław - qualify to the Final, but he was injury
  - 2010 - (Poland) Leszno - 3rd placed (13 pts)

== See also ==
- Poland national speedway team (U21, U19)
- Speedway in Poland
