= 2009 Team Speedway Junior Polish Championship =

Polish motorcycle speedway competition stubs

Seasons
- ← 2008 2010 →

The 2009 Team Speedway Junior Polish Championship (Polish: Młodzieżowe Drużynowe Mistrzostwa Polski, MDMP) is the 2009 version of Team Speedway Junior Polish Championship organized by the Polish Motor Union (PZM). The defending Champion is Unia Leszno. The Final took place on 27 August 2009 at MotoArena Toruń in Toruń and was won by host team Unibax Toruń (41 points) where they beat Caelum Stal Gorzów Wlkp (38 points), Unia Leszno (33 points) and Marma Hadykówka Rzeszów (7 points).

== Qualifications ==
The draw for Qualifying Groups was made by Main Commission of Speedway Sport and was announced in "Komunikat Nr 20/2009" on 14 May 2009.

- Round 1: 27 May 2009
- Round 2: 9 July 2009
- Round 3: 30 July 2009
- Round 4: 13 August 2009

=== Group A ===
Team	width=20|Pld	width=20|PF	width=20|Pts
Unibax Toruń	4	149	12
Lotos Wybrzeże Gdańsk	4	75	4
Polonia Bydgoszcz	4	73	4
GTŻ Grudziądz	4	63	4

	TOR	GDA	BYD	GRU
Toruń	45	36	38	30
Gdańsk	12	23	22	18
Bydgoszcz	14	19	24	16
Grudziądz	21	8	9	25

=== Group B ===
Team	width=20|Pld	width=20|PF	width=20|Pts
Marma Hadykówka Rze-ów	3	99	11
Unia Tarnów	3	80	6
KSM Krosno	3	55	4
Redstar KMŻ Lublin	3	49	3

	TAR	LUB	RZE	KRO
Tarnów	10	18	23	29
Lublin	3	23	16	7
Rzeszów	14	27	31	27
Krosno	13	20	12	10

Notes:

First round (8 June): only 8 of 16 heats
Fourth round (18 August)

=== Group C ===
Team	width=20|Pld	width=20|PF	width=20|Pts
Unia Leszno	4	143	11.5
RKM ROW Rybnik	4	132	8.5
CKM Włókniarz Częstochowa	4	94	4
Kolejarz Opole	4	13	0

	RYB	CZE	LES	OPO
Rybnik	34	32	34	32
Częstochowa	21	27	20	26
Leszno	34	34	39	36
Opole	5	3	3	2

Notes:

Second round (14 July)

=== Group D ===
Team	width=20|Pld	width=20|PF	width=20|Pts
Stal Gorzów Wlkp.	4	149	12
ZKŻ Zielona Góra	4	113	8
Start Gniezno	4	63	2
KM Ostrów Wlkp.	4	53	2

	ZIE	OST	GNI	GOR
Zielona Góra	24	33	26	30
Ostrów Wlkp.	20	16	11	6
Gniezno	14	13	22	14
Gorzów Wlkp.	38	34	36	41

== Final ==
- The Final
- 27 August 2009 (17:00 CEST)
- Toruń, MotoArena Toruń
- Referee: Wojciech Grodzki
- Best time: 59.16 - Kamil Pulczyński in Heat 8
- Attendance: 1,000

Placing	Team / Rider name	Total	1	2	3	4	5	6	7	8	9	10	11	12	13	14	15	16	Pts	17	18	19	20
1	Unibax Toruń	41	2	5	8	8	11	14	14	17	19	20	22	25	27	28	31	33		34	37	39	41
1	(5) Damian Celmer	12	2					3					2					2	9		3
1	(6) Emil Pulczyński	14		3			3							3			3		12				2
1	(7) Bartosz Pietrykowski	1				0			-			1				-			1	-
1	(8) Kamil Pulczyński	12			3					3	2				2				10			2
1	(18) Łukasz Przedpełski	2							F							1			1	1
2	Caelum Stal Gorzów Wlkp.	38	1	2	4	7	8	10	13	15	18	20	23	25	26	29	29	32		35	37	38	38
2	(13) Paweł Zmarzlik	10		1					3		3							3	10				0
2	(14) Mateusz Mikorski	8	1							2		2					0		5	3
2	(15) Łukasz Cyran	10			2			2						2		3			9			1
2	(16) Adrian Szewczykowski	10				3	1						3		1				8		2
2	(20) Paweł Parys	0																	0
3	Unia Leszno	33	3	5	6	7	9	10	12	13	13	16	16	17	20	22	23	24		26	27	30	33
3	(1) Mateusz Łukaszewski	5				1				1				1				1	4		1
3	(2) Kamil Adamczewski	6			1				2				F				1		4	2
3	(3) Przemysław Pawlicki	12		2				1				3			3				9				3
3	(4) Sławomir Musielak	10	3				2				0					2			7			3
4	Marma Hadykówka Rzeszów	7	0	0	0	2	2	2	2	2	3	3	4	4	4	4	6	6		6	6	6	7
4	(9) None	0																	0
4	(10) Mateusz Szostek	6				2		0			1						2		5				1
4	(11) Łukasz Kret	1		0									1			0			1			0
4	(12) None	0																	0
	Track reserves	1	0	0	0	0	0	0	0	0	0	1	1	1	1	1	1	1		1	1	1	1
	(R1) Damian Boniecki (TOR)	1			F		N					1						0	1
	(R2) Adam Wojciechowski (TOR)	1	0						0					T	0				0
Placing	Team / Rider name	Total	1	2	3	4	5	6	7	8	9	10	11	12	13	14	15	16	Pts	17	18	19	20

M - exclusion for exceeding two-minute time allowance • T - exclusion for touching the tapes • X - other exclusion • E - retired or mechanical failure • F - fell

Helmet colours were permanent for each team (Red, Blue, White and Yellow/Black). Colours in diagrams indicate gate positions:
gate A – inside	gate B	gate C	gate D – outside

Dawid Lampart

== See also ==
- 2009 Individual Speedway Junior Polish Championship
- 2009 Team Speedway Polish Championship (2009 Speedway Ekstraliga)
