= 1961 Polish speedway season =

Motorcycle racing competition

The 1961 Polish Speedway season was the 1961 season of motorcycle speedway in Poland.

== Individual ==
=== Polish Individual Speedway Championship ===
The 1961 Individual Speedway Polish Championship was held on 24 September at Rzeszow.

Pos.	Rider	Club	Total	Points
1	Florian Kapała	Rzeszów	14	(2,3,3,3,3)
2	Marian Kaiser	Gdańsk	13+3	(3,2,3,3,2)
3	Henryk Żyto	Leszno	13+2	(3,2,3,2,3)
4	Mieczysław Połukard	Bydgoszcz	12	(3,3,1,3,2)
5	Joachim Maj	Rybnik	12	(2,3,2,2,3)
6	Jan Malinowski	Rzeszów	10	(3,0,2,2,3)
7	Janusz Suchecki	Bydgoszcz	7	(2,2,1,1,1)
8	Norbert Świtała	Bydgoszcz	7	(1,3,1,1,1)
9	Stefan Kępa (res)	Rzeszów	7	(1,3,3)
10	Jan Mucha	Świętochłowice	5	(w,1,2,d,2)
11	Janusz Kościelak (res)	Rzeszów	4	(1,2,w,0,1)
12	Andrzej Domiszewski	Wrocław	4	(1,1,0,2,0)
13	Jan Kolber	Rzeszów	3	(1,w,1,1,0)
14	Antoni Woryna	Rybnik	2	(0,0,2)
15	Marian Rose	Toruń	2	(0,1,0,1,0)
16	Stanisław Tkocz	Rybnik	2	(2,u)
17	Marian Stawecki (res)	Rzeszów	2	(2,0,0)
18	Rajmund Świtała	Bydgoszcz	1	(0,u,0,0,1)
19	Marian Spychała	Rzeszów	0	(u/-)
20	Konstanty Pociejkowicz (res)	Wrocław		(ns)

=== Golden Helmet ===
The 1961 Golden Helmet (Polish: Turniej o Złoty Kask, ZK) organised by the Polish Motor Union (PZM) was the inaugural event for leagues 12 leading riders.

Calendar

Date	Venue	Winner
22 IV	Bydgoszcz	Florian Kapała (Rzeszów)
6 V	Rzeszów	Florian Kapała (Rzeszów)
13 V	Nowa Huta	Joachim Maj (Rybnik)
20 V	Gdańsk	Henryk Żyto (Leszno)
3 VI	Wrocław	Marian Kaiser (Gdańsk)
10 VI	Rybnik	Stanisław Tkocz (Rybnik)
24 VI	Poznań	Henryk Żyto (Leszno)
8 VII	Częstochowa	Marian Kaiser (Gdańsk)
9 IX	Warsaw	Henryk Żyto (Leszno)

Final classification Note: Result from final score was subtracted with two the weakest events.

Pos.	Rider	Club	Total	BYD	RZE	KRA	GDA	WRO	RYB	POZ	CZE	WAR
1	Florian Kapała	Rzeszów	96	15	15	13	15	11	13	14	10	10
2	Henryk Żyto	Leszno	91	4	10	13	18	6	12	15	8	15
3	Marian Kaiser	Gdańsk	90	12	8	11	12	15	13	13	14	11
4	Joachim Maj	Rybnik	80	6	9	14	8	12	12	9	13	11
5	Stanisław Tkocz	Rybnik	77	5	5	12	14	9	15	10	6	11
6	Mieczysław Połukard	Bydgoszcz	63	8	4	6	10	8	5	12	14	1
7	Stefan Kępa	Rzeszów	60	4	10	7	10	4	7	6	8	12
8	Norbert Świtała	Bydgoszcz	58	8	6	6	5	13	3	10	10	1
9	Jan Malinowski	Rzeszów	45	0	9	7	8	5	-	3	4	9
10	Janusz Suchecki	Bydgoszcz	42	7	5	5	6	-	-	5	5	9
11	Stanisław Rurarz	Częstochowa	40	6	3	3	11	8	3	4	-	5
12	Jan Kusiak	Leszno	17	2	-	2	2	0	2	6	-	3

== Team ==
=== Team Speedway Polish Championship ===
The 1961 Team Speedway Polish Championship was the 14th edition of the Team Polish Championship.

Stal Rzeszów won the gold medal for the second consecutive season.

=== First League ===
Pos	Club	Pts	W	D	L	+/−
1	Stal Rzeszów	27	13	1	0	+307
2	Górnik Rybnik	20	10	0	4	+251
3	Polonia Bydgoszcz	18	9	0	5	+63
4	Unia Leszno	13	6	1	7	+37
5	Włókniarz Częstochowa	12	6	0	8	-65
6	Sparta Wrocław	12	6	0	8	-7
7	Legia Gdańsk	8	4	0	10	–123
8	Wanda Nowa Huta	2	1	0	13	–393

=== Second League ===
Pos	Club	Pts	W	D	L	+/−
1	Stal Gorzów Wielkopolski	36	18	0	2	+420
2	Unia Tarnów	30	15	0	5	+256
3	Tramwajarz Łódź	26	13	0	7	+166
4	Legia Krosno	26	13	0	7	+135
5	Śląsk Świętochłowice	22	10	2	8	+120
6	Start Gniezno	19	9	1	10	–1
7	MKŻ Toruń	18	9	0	11	–147
8	Sparta Śrem	15	7	1	12	–199
9	Polonia Piła	14	7	0	14	–37
10	Zgrzeblarki Zielona Góra	8	4	0	16	–261
11	Kolejarz Opole	2	1	0	19	–452

Play off

- Tarnów v Gdańsk 34:44, 28:48
