= Robert Kasprzak =

Polish speedway rider

- Born: 8 April 1987 (age 39); Leszno, Poland
- Nationality: Polish

Career history

Poland
- 2003-2008: Leszno

Great Britain
- 2005: Isle of Wight

Team honours
- 2007: Team Polish Champion
- 2005: Polish Pairs U-21 Champion
- 2008: Team U-21 Polish Champion

Robert Kasprzak (born 8 April 1987 in Leszno, Poland) is a former motorcycle speedway rider from Poland, who was a member of Poland U-21 national team.

== Career ==
Kasprzak rode for Unia Leszno from 2003 to 2008. He received a six month ban from racing after assaulting Rune Holta during a match on 3 July 2005.

Kasprzak also rode a few matches in Britain for the Isle of Wight Islanders, during the 2005 Premier League speedway season.

== Family ==
Kasprzak is a son of former Polish national speedway team member Zenon Kasprzak. His brother Krzysztof (born 1984) is also a speedway rider who was a 2008 Speedway Grand Prix rider and U-21 World Champion.

== Results ==
- Individual U-21 World Championship
  - 2008 – 16th place in semi-final 1 (1 point)
- Team U-21 World Championship
  - 2008 – did not start in the final (14 pts in qualifying round 2)
- Individual Polish Championship
  - 2008 – 10th place in quarter-final 4 (6 points)
- Individual U-21 Polish Championship:
  - 2008 – Rybnik – 7th place (9 points)
- Team Polish Championship
  - 2007 – Polish Champion
  - 2008 – Runner-up
- Team U-21 Polish Championship
  - 2008 – (Poland) Leszno – Polish Champion (12 points)
- Polish Pairs U-21 Championship
  - 2005 – Polish Champion
- Polish Silver Helmet (U-21)
  - 2008 – 10th place in semi-final 1 (7 points)

== See also ==
- Poland national speedway team
