= KS Apator Stadium =

Polish motorcycle speedway track

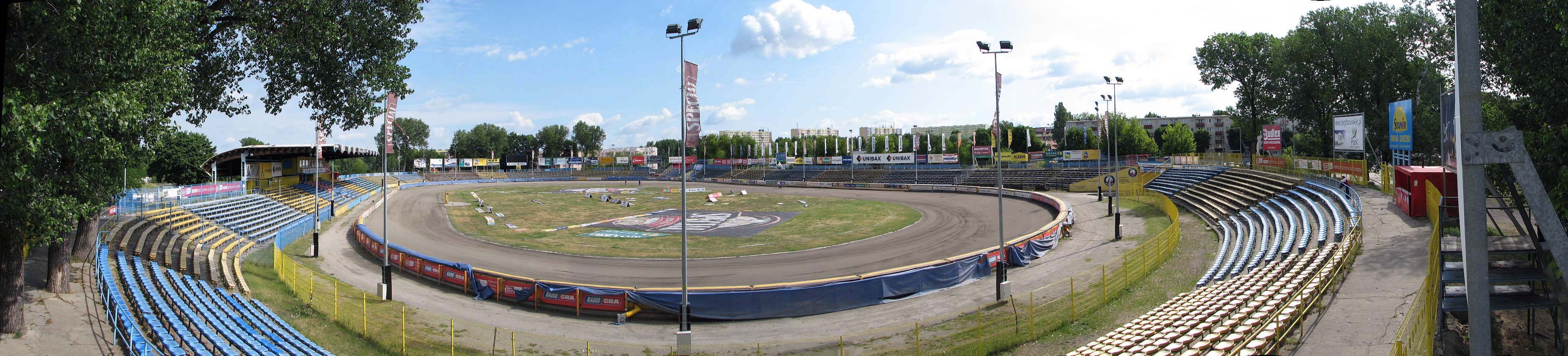
- The stadium in 2008
- Interactive map of KS Apator Stadium
- Location: Broniewskiego 98, 87-100 Toruń, Poland
- Coordinates: 53°00′56″N 18°33′42″E
- Owner: until 1939:DOK VIII after 1945:City of Toruń
- Operator: KS Apator Toruń
- Capacity: 18,000

Construction
- Opened: 17 August 1924
- Renovated: 20 October 1957

Tenant
- motorcycle speedway

KS Apator Stadium is a former multi-use stadium in Toruń, Poland, that existed from 1924 until its demolition in 2008.

== History ==
=== 1927 to 1945 ===
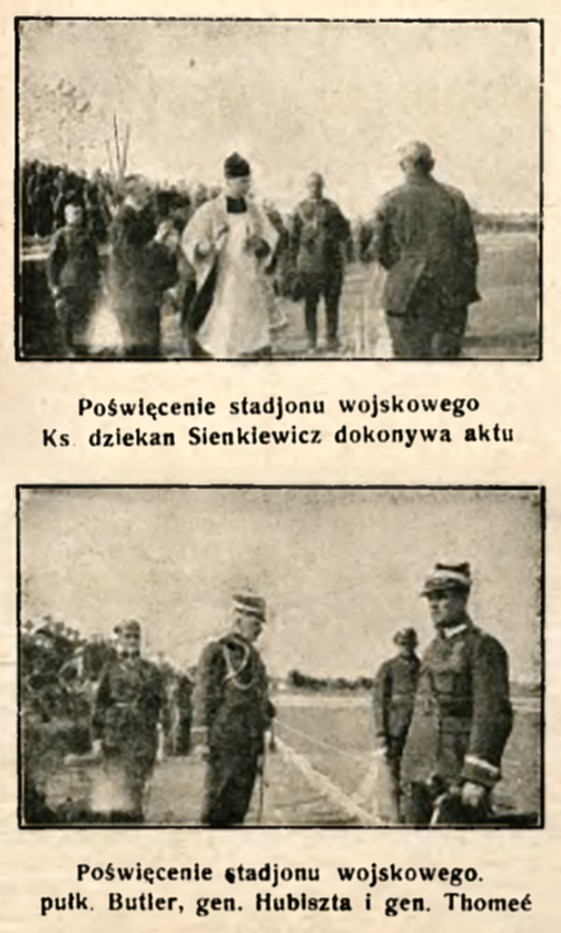
The opening of the stadium in 1927

The stadium was built by soldiers of the 8th Sapper Regiment, as a sports ground for the District Command of the VIII Corps. It opened on 17 August 1924 and was known as the Military Stadium. The track was 500 metres long due to the needs of the military for horse riding but it had a main athletics track, in addition to two training fields. The sports club Gryf Toruń used the stadium, as did TKS Toruń, who played Polish football league matches there.

=== 1945 to 2008 ===
After World War II, the stadium was no longer needed for military needs and in 1950, it was first used as a motorcycle speedway venue. Previously the Toruń speedway team had used the Municipal Stadium at ul. Sportowa. In 1957, due to regulatory requirements, a major renovation took place and the new facilities opened on 20 October 1957. The stadium was now named after Zbigniew Raniszewski, a Polish speedway rider who lost his life in a race in Vienna on 21 April 1956.

In 1970, 18 year-old Benedykt Błaszkiewicz died in a training crash and in 1992, 17 year-old Grzegorz Kowszewicz died on the track during training.

The stadium was a significant venue for speedway and hosted important events, including a qualifying round of the Speedway World Championship in 1985, a qualifying round of the Speedway World Team Cup in 1993, and a semi-final of the Speedway World Pairs Championship in 1987.

In 1994, the stadium was renamed again, taking the name of Marian Rose (another rider killed in a race) at the Stal Rzeszów Municipal Stadium on 19 April 1970. The KS Apator Toruń speedway team won the league championship while based at the stadium in 1986 and 1990.

Plans for a new speedway stadium arose in 2008 and the last league match held at the KS Apator Stadium was a Team Speedway Polish Championship match against Unia Leszno during the 2008 season, played on 19 October. A few days later, on 25 October the stadium hosted the final of the Pomeranian Youth League before being sold by the city for PLN 60,270,000 to developers, who in turn built the Toruń Plaza shopping center on the site.

== See also ==
- Speedway in Poland
