= Mateusz Szczepaniak (speedway rider) =

Polish speedway rider

- Born: 10 February 1987 (age 39); Poland
- Nationality: Polish

Career history

Poland
- 2003: Piła
- 2004–2008: Częstochowa
- 2009–2010: Poznań
- 2011–2012: Łódź
- 2013–2014, 2024: Bydgoszcz
- 2015: Ostrów
- 2016–2017: Kraków
- 2018–2020: Rybnik
- 2021–2022: Wilki Krosno
- 2023: Grudziądz
- 2025: Tarnów

Great Britain
- 2011, 2018: Poole
- 2012: King's Lynn
- 2013: Coventry

Sweden
- 2022: Piraterna
- 2024: Rospiggarna

Denmark
- 2010: Esbjerg
- 2017: Grindsted

Individual honours
- 2006: Polish Bronze Helmet U-19 Winner

Team honours
- 2007: Under-21 World Cup Winner
- 2004: European Club Champions' Cup Winner

Mateusz Szczepaniak (born 10 February 1987 is a Polish international motorcycle speedway rider. He won the Team Under 21 World Championship with the Poland speedway team.

== Career ==
Szczepaniak first rode in the 2003 Polish speedway season when riding for Polonia Piła in the Team Speedway Polish Championship. In subsequent seasons, he then rode for Włókniarz Częstochowa, Poznań, Łódź, Polonia Bydgoszcz, Ostrów, Kraków and ŻKS ROW Rybnik.

In 2012, Szczepaniak was due to sign for Poole Pirates in the British leagues after riding one match for them in 2011, but the deal fell through and he signed for the King's Lynn Stars instead. He rode a few matches for Coventry Bees in 2013 before returning to British speedway with Poole in 2018.

In 2022, Szczepaniak helped Wilki Krosno win the 2022 1.Liga. The following season, he signed for GKM Grudziądz for the 2023 Polish speedway season and joined Rospiggarna mid-way through the 2024 Swedish speedway season.

== Family ==
Szczepaniak's elder brother Michał is also a speedway rider.

== Honours ==
- Individual U-21 World Championship
  - 2008 - 10th place in Semi-Final 1 (7 points)
- Team U-21 World Championship
  - 2007 - World Champion (9 points)
- Individual U-19 European Championship
  - 2006 - 11th place (6 points)
- European Club Champions' Cup
  - 2004 - European Champion (track reserve)
- Individual U-21 Polish Championship
  - 2008 - Rybnik - 9th place (7 points)
- Team Polish Championship
  - 2004 - 3rd place
  - 2005 - 3rd place
  - 2006 - 2nd place
  - 2007 - 5th place - CMA 5.57 (details)
- Team U-21 Polish Championship
  - 2008 - (Poland) Leszno - Bronze medal (11 points)
- Polish Silver Helmet (U-21)
  - 2008 - (Poland) Rzeszów - 4th place (11+N points)
- Bronze Helmet (U-19)
  - 2006 - Winner

== See also ==
- Poland national speedway team
