= 1996 Polish speedway season =

Motorcycle racing competition

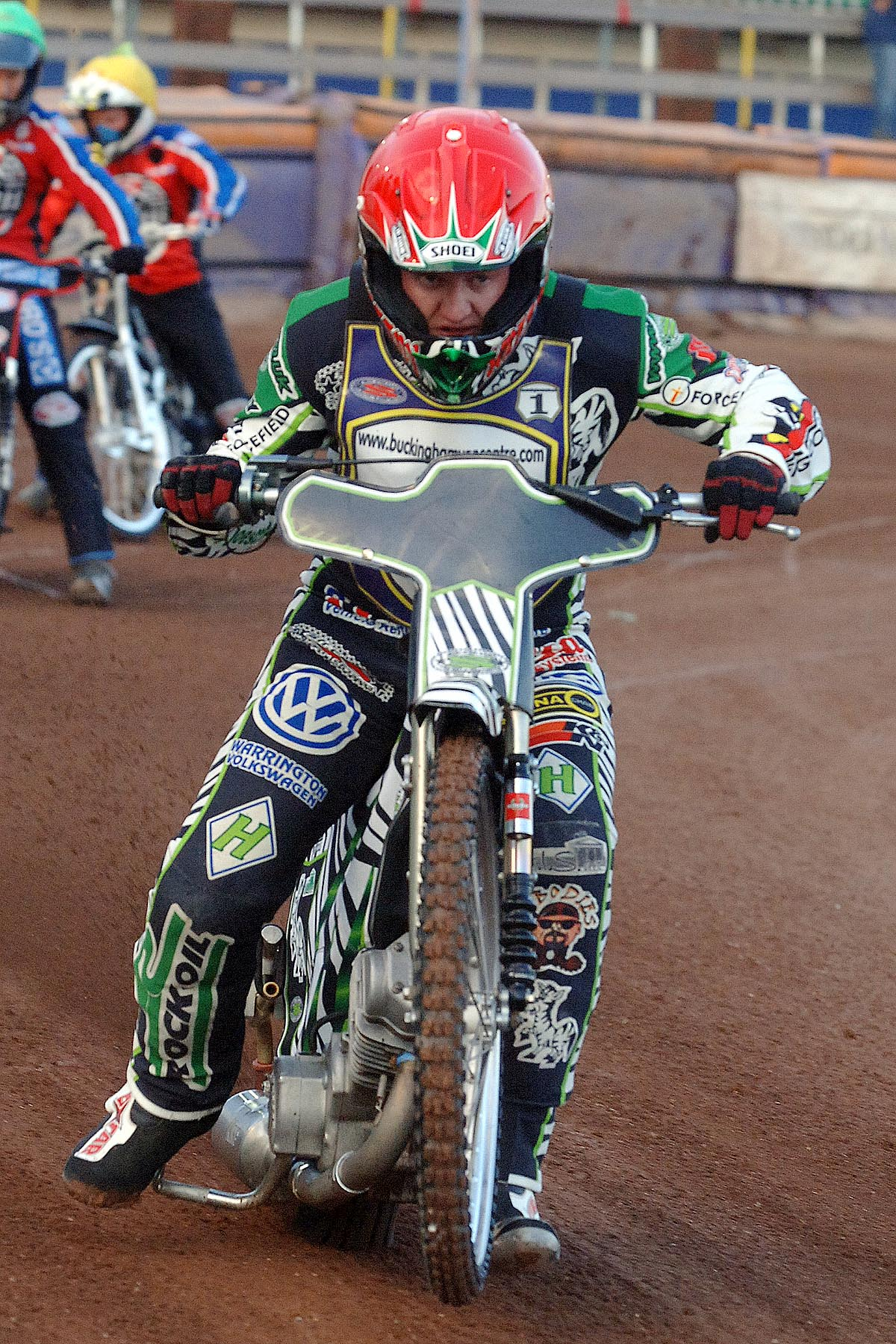
- British rider Joe Screen topped the averages for champions Włókniarz Częstochowa

The 1996 Polish Speedway season was the 1996 season of motorcycle speedway in Poland.

== Individual ==
=== Polish Individual Speedway Championship ===
The 1996 Individual Speedway Polish Championship final was held on 15 August at Warsaw. Sławomir Drabik won the Polish title for the second time and five years after his first triumph in 1991.

Pos.	Rider	Club	Total	Points
1	Sławomir Drabik	Częstochowa	15	(3,3,3,3,3)
2	Adam Łabędzki	Leszno	13	(3,3,3,2,2)
3	Roman Jankowski	Leszno	12	(3,0,3,3,3)
4	Tomasz Gollob	Bydgoszcz	11	(3,2,w,3,3)
5	Mirosław Kowalik	Toruń	9	(1,2,2,2,2)
6	Grzegorz Rempała	Rzeszów	8	(2,3,2,1,d)
7	Dariusz Śledź	Wrocław	7	(2,d,3,0,2)
8	Sebastian Ułamek	Częstochowa	7	(0,3,2,1,1)
9	Jacek Krzyżaniak	Toruń	7	(1,2,2,2,0)
10	Sławomir Dudek	Zielona Góra	7	(2,1,1,2,1)
11	Tomasz Bajerski	Toruń	6	(0,2,0,1,3)
12	Jacek Rempała	Tarnów	5	(0,1,0,3,1)
13	Jacek Gollob	Bydgoszcz	4	(2,1,1,0,t)
14	Adam Fajfer	Gniezno	4	(0,0,1,1,2)
15	Mirosław Cierniak	Tarnów	3	(1,0,0,1,1)
16	Robert Sawina	Gniezno	2	(1,1,0,0,0)
17	Piotr Świst	Gorzów Wlkp.	ns	
18	Andrzej Huszcza	Zielona Góra	ns	

=== Golden Helmet ===
The 1996 Golden Golden Helmet (Polish: Turniej o Złoty Kask, ZK) organised by the Polish Motor Union (PZM) was the 1996 event for the league's leading riders. The final was held at Wrocław on the 27 September. Jacek Gollob won the Golden Helmet title and defeated his brother Tomasz Gollob in a final run off after they both finished on 14 points.

Pos.	Rider	Club	Total	Points
1	Jacek Gollob	Bydgoszcz	14 +3	(3,3,2,3,3)
2	Tomasz Gollob	Bydgoszcz	14 +2	(2,3,3,3,3)
3	Roman Jankowski	Leszno	10 +3	(2,1,3,2,2)
4	Rafał Dobrucki	Piła	10 +2	(d,3,3,2,2)
5	Andrzej Huszcza	Zielona Góra	10 +1	(1,2,2,2,3)
6	Piotr Świst	Gorzów Wlkp.	9	(3,1,3,0,2)
7	Tomasz Bajerski	Toruń	9	(1,1,1,3,3)
8	Robert Sawina	Gniezno	8	(3,3,0,1,1)
9	Piotr Protasiewicz	Wrocław	7	(2,2,2,1,0)
10	Sławomir Drabik	Częstochowa	7	(2,2,1,1,1)
11	Jacek Rempała	Tarnów	5	(1,0,2,1,1)
12	Zenon Kasprzak	Rawicz	4	(3,0,1,0,0)
13	Jacek Krzyżaniak	Toruń	4	(0,1,0,3,d)
14	Dariusz Śledź	Wrocław	3	(0,2,1,0,0)
15	Damian Baliński	Leszno	3	(1,0,0,0,2)
16	Sebastian Ułamek	Częstochowa	3	(0,0,d,2,1)
17	Janusz Stachyra (res)	Częstochowa	ns	
18	Adam Łabędzki (res)	Leszno	ns	

=== Junior Championship ===
- winner - Tomasz Bajerski

=== Silver Helmet ===
- winner - Wiesław Jaguś

=== Bronze Helmet ===
- winner - Damian Baliński

== Pairs ==
=== Polish Pairs Speedway Championship ===
The 1996 Polish Pairs Speedway Championship was the 1996 edition of the Polish Pairs Speedway Championship. The final was held on 23 May at Gniezno.

Pos	Team	Pts	Riders
1	Polonia Bydgoszcz	24	Tomasz Gollob 11, Jacek Gollob 13
2	Start Gniezno	23	Adam Fajfer 13, Robert Sawina 10
3	Apator Toruń	19	Jacek Krzyżaniak 8, Mirosław Kowalik 0, Tomasz Bajerski 11
4	Unia Tarnów	18	Jacek Rempała 15, Mirosław Cierniak 3
5	Unia Leszno	18	Roman Jankowski 9, Adam Łabędzki 0, Damian Baliński 9
6	Włókniarz Częstochowa	14	Sławomir Drabik 12, Sebastian Ułamek 2, Janusz Stachyra 0
7	Atlas Wrocław	10	Dariusz Śledź 2, Piotr Protasiewicz 6, Krzysztof Zieliński 2

== Team ==
=== Team Speedway Polish Championship ===
The 1996 Team Speedway Polish Championship was the 1996 edition of the Team Polish Championship. Włókniarz Częstochowa won the gold medal, which was their first Championship gold since 1974. The team included Joe Screen, Sławomir Drabik and Sebastian Ułamek.

==== First Division ====
Pos	Team	Pts	W	D	L	Diff
1	Apator Toruń	26	13	0	5	+94
2	Polonia Piła	25	12	1	5	+169
3	Włókniarz Częstochowa	24	12	0	6	+84
4	Stal Gorzów Wielkopolski	23	11	1	6	+21
5	Atlas Wrocław	21	10	1	7	+85
6	Polonia Bydgoszcz	17	8	1	9	+11
7	Start Gniezno	15	7	1	10	–68
8	Stal Rzeszów	10	5	0	13	–91
9	GKM Grudziądz	10	5	0	13	–193
10	Unia Tarnów	9	4	1	13	–112

Play offs

Team	Team	Team	Score
semi final	Gorzów	Toruń	43:47, 32:58
semi final	Częstochowa	Piła	57:33, 41:49
final	Toruń	Częstochowa	40:50, 46:44

==== Second Division ====
Pos	Team	Pts	W	D	L	Diff
1	Unia Leszno	44	22	0	0	+781
2	ZKŻ Zielona Góra	38	19	0	3	+506
3	Wybrzeże Gdańsk	35	17	1	4	+364
4	Łódź	28	14	0	8	+184
5	Ostrów	26	13	0	9	+188
6	Śląsk Świętochłowice	22	11	0	11	–116
7	Wanda Kraków	20	10	0	12	–169
8	RKM Rybnik	20	10	0	12	–71
9	Kolejarz Rawicz	18	9	0	13	–91
10	LKŻ Lublin	7	3	1	18	–365
11	KKŻ Krosno	4	2	0	20	–582
12	Kolejarz Opole	2	1	0	21	–629
