= 1959 Polish speedway season =

Motorcycle racing competition

The 1959 Polish Speedway season was the 1959 season of motorcycle speedway in Poland.

== Individual ==
=== Polish Individual Speedway Championship ===
The 1959 Individual Speedway Polish Championship was held on 30 August at Rybnik.

Pos.	Rider	Club	Total	Points
1	Stefan Kwoczała	Częstochowa	14	(3,3,3,2,3)
2	Jan Malinowski	Rzeszów	12,5	(3,3,2,3,(1,5))
3	Florian Kapała	Rzeszów	12	(3,t,3,3,3)
4	Stefan Kępa	Rzeszów	11,5	(3,1,3,3,(1,5))
5	Stanisław Rurarz	Częstochowa	10	(0,3,3,2,2)
6	Norbert Świtała	Bydgoszcz	8	(2,0,0,3,3)
7	Joachim Maj	Rybnik	8	(w,3,2,1,2)
8	Stanisław Tkocz	Rybnik	7	(1,wu,2,1,3)
9	Henryk Żyto	Leszno	7	(0,2,1,2,2)
10	Julian Kuciak	Częstochowa	6	(2,1,1,2,0)
11	Marian Philipp	Rybnik	6	(1,2,2,0,1)
12	Józef Wieczorek	Rybnik	6	(2,2,1,1,w)
13	Konstanty Pociejkowicz	Wrocław	4	(2,2,w,u)
14	Kazimierz Bentke	Ostrów Wlkp.	3	(1,1,0,0,1)
15	Bernard Kacperak	Częstochowa	3	(0,1,1,0,1)
16	Witold Świątkowski	Rawicz	1	(1,0,0,0,0)
17	Czesław Odrzywolski (res)	Gniezno	1	(1,0)
18	Mieczysław Połukard (res)	Bydgoszcz		(ns)

=== Criterium of Aces ===
The Criterium of Aces was won by Stanisław Tkocz.

== Team ==
=== Team Speedway Polish Championship ===
The 1959 Team Speedway Polish Championship was the 12th edition of the Team Polish Championship.

==== First League ====
Pos	Team	Match	Points	Won	Draw	Lost	+/-
1	Włókniarz Częstochowa	14	26	13	0	1	+301
2	Górnik Rybnik	14	24	12	0	2	+232
3	Legia Warszawa	14	18	9	0	5	+162
4	Polonia Bydgoszcz	14	17	8	1	5	-11
5	Start Gniezno	14	11	5	1	8	-130
6	Unia Leszno	14	8	4	0	10	-93
7	Sparta Wrocław	14	6	3	0	11	-253
8	Kolejarz Rawicz	14	2	1	0	13	-208

Medalists

Włókniarz Częstochowa	Stanisław Rurarz (2.44), Stefan Kwoczała (2.42), Bernard Kacperak (2.40), Bronisław Idzikowski (1.72), Zdzisław Jałowiecki (1.50), Julian Kuciak (1.47), Tadeusz Chwilczyński (1.35), Waldemar Miechowski (1.00)
Górnik Rybnik	Stanisław Tkocz (2.74), Joachim Maj (2.78), Marian Philipp (2.22), Józef Wieczorek (1.80), Bogdan Berliński (1.33), Lip (1.22), Erwin Maj (1.10), Karol Peszke (0.95)
Legia Warszawa	Marian Kaiser (2.48), Paweł Waloszek (2.46), Euzebiusz Goździk (2.06), Stanisław Kaiser (1.66), Henryk Ciorga (1.17) (until August 1959), Wiktor Waloszek (0.86), Czesław Kraska, Janusz Suchecki, Bronisław Rogal, Jan Komandowski, Mieczysław Śledź, Mirosław Pokrzywa,

==== Second League ====
Pos	Team	Match	Points	Won	Draw	Lost	+/-
1	Stal Rzeszów	14	27	13	1	0	+300
2	Unia Tarnów	14	18	9	0	5	+145
3	Stal Gorzów Wlkp.	14	16	8	0	6	+2
4	Wanda Nowa Huta	14	14	6	2	6	+43
5	Tramwajarz Łódź	14	14	7	0	7	-20
6	Skra Warszawa	14	12	6	0	8	-8
7	Ostrovia Ostrów Wlkp.	14	11	5	1	8	-84
8	Stal Świętochłowice	14	0	0	0	14	-378

==== Third League ====
Pos	Team	Match	Points	Won	Draw	Lost	+/-
1	Cracovia Kraków	14	24	12	0	2	+123
2	Legia Krosno	14	22	11	0	3	+231
3	LPŻ Neptun Gdańsk	14	18	9	0	5	+16
4	Sparta Śrem	14	14	7	0	7	+2
5	Polonia Piła	14	12	6	0	8	-16
6	LPŻ Zielona Góra	14	9	4	1	9	-68
7	LPŻ Toruń	14	7	3	1	10	-121
8	CWK Czeladź	14	6	3	0	11	-167
