= Polish Pairs Speedway Junior Championship =

The Polish Pairs Speedway Junior Championship (Polish: Młodzieżowe Mistrzostwa Polski Par Klubowych, MMPPK) is an annual speedway event held each year in different Polish clubs organized by the Polish Motor Union since 1983.

First edition was in 1980, but it was a Junior U-23 event.

The participating teams are drawn into three groups; each staging a pairs competition. The top two teams in each group qualify for the Final. A host team chosen by the GKSŻ is seeded directly to the Final.

The team winning the Final is awarded a gold medal and declared Polish Pairs Champions. Teams finishing second and third are awarded silver and bronze medals respectively.

== Previous winners ==
Year		Winners	2nd place	3rd place
1980	Bydgoszcz	Polonia Bydgoszcz	Apator Toruń	ROW Rybnik
1981				
1982				
1983	Tarnów	ROW Rybnik	Wybrzeże Gdańsk	Unia Tarnów
1984	Rybnik	Kolejarz Opole	ROW Rybnik	Stal Gorzów Wlkp.
1985	Bydgoszcz	Stal Gorzów Wlkp.	Polonia Bydgoszcz	Falubaz Zielona Góra
1986	Ostrów Wlkp.	Stal Gorzów Wlkp.	Polonia Bydgoszcz	Unia Leszno
1987	Leszno	Stal Gorzów Wlkp.	Polonia Bydgoszcz	Start Gniezno
1988	Rzeszów	Falubaz Zielona Góra	Stal Gorzów Wlkp.	Polonia Bydgoszcz
1989	Gdańsk	Wybrzeże Gdańsk	Stal Gorzów Wlkp.	Falubaz Zielona Góra
1990	Toruń	Apator Toruń	Start Gniezno	ROW Rybnik
Year		Winners	2nd place	3rd place
1991	Gorzów Wlkp.	Apator Toruń	Unia-Rolnicki Tarnów	Morawski Zielona Góra
1992	Toruń	Apator Toruń	Unia Tarnów	Morawski Zielona Góra
1993	Rybnik	Apator-Elektrim Toruń	Stal Rzeszów	ROW Rybnik
1994	Krosno	Unia Tarnów	Stal-Brunat Gorzów Wlkp.	Apator-Elektrim Toruń
1995	Piła	Polonia Piła	Włókniarz Częstochowa	Apator-Elektrim Toruń
1996	Leszno	Unia Leszno	Polonia-Philips Piła	Włókniarz-Malma Częstochowa
1997	Rzeszów	Unia Leszno	Polonia-Philips Piła	Stal-Van Pur Rzesżów
1998	Piła	Polonia Piła	Trilux-Start Gniezno	Atlas Wrocław
1999	Ostrów Wlkp.	Iskra Ostrów Wlkp.	Pergo Gorzów Wlkp.	Trilux-Start Gniezno
2000	Piła	Ludwik-Polonia Piła	Lotos-Wybrzeże Gdańsk	Apator-Netia Toruń
Year		Winners	2nd place	3rd place
2001	Rybnik	ZKŻ Polmos Zielona Góra	Atlas Wrocław	Bractwo-Polonia Bydgoszcz
2002	Piła	BGŻ S.A.-Polonia Piła	RKM Rybnik	ZKŻ Quick-Mix Zielona Góra
2003	Piła	RKM Rybnik	Top Secret-Włókniarz Częstochowa	Polonia Piła
2004	Częstochowa	Unia Tarnów	Unia Leszno	Apator-Adriana Toruń
2005	Gorzów Wlkp.	Unia Leszno	Unia Tarnów	Mars RTV AGD Gorzów Wlkp.
2006	Tarnów	Marma Polskie Folie Rzeszów	Budlex-Polonia Bydgoszcz	Atlas Wrocław
2007	Leszno	Unibax Toruń	Stal Gorzów Wlkp.	RKM Rybnik
2008	Gorzów Wlkp.	RKM Rybnik	Intar Lazur Ostrów Wlkp.	Marma Polskie Folie Rzeszów
2009	Rybnik	Unia Leszno	Falubaz Zielona Góra	UKS Żaki Taczanów
Year		Winners	2nd place	3rd place
