= 2007 Polish speedway season =

Motorcycle racing competition

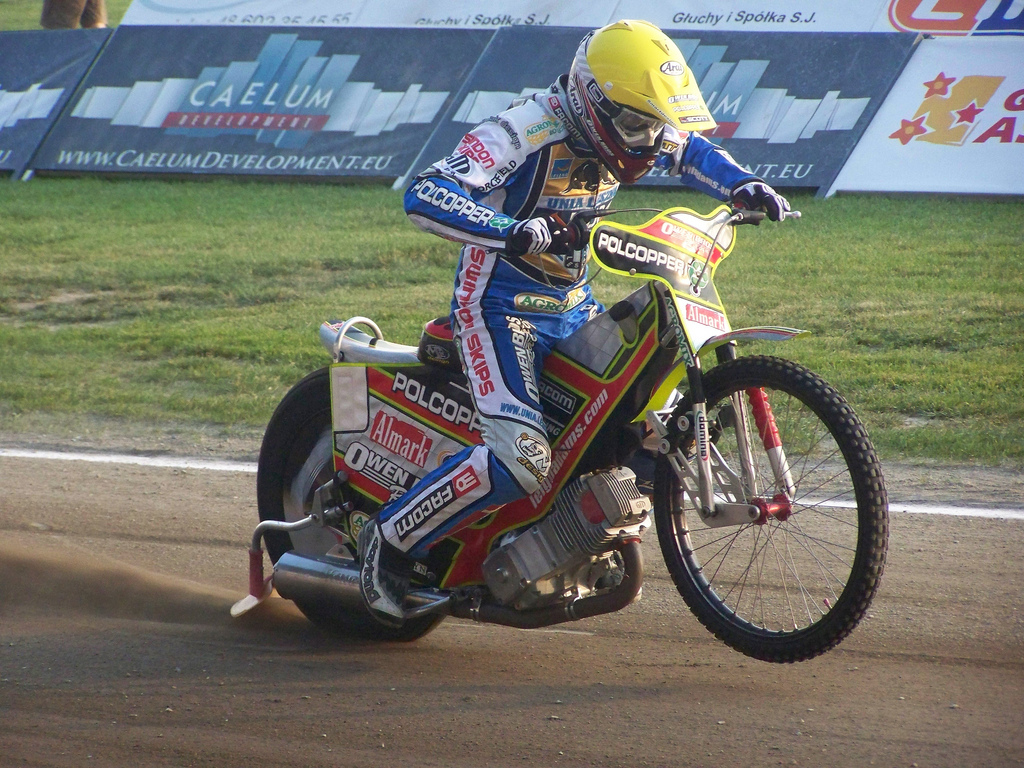
- Australian Leigh Adams helped Unia Leszno become the Polish champions again

The 2007 Polish Speedway season was the 2007 season of motorcycle speedway in Poland.

== Individual ==
=== Polish Individual Speedway Championship ===
The 2007 Individual Speedway Polish Championship final was held on 15 August at Wrocław.

Pos.	Rider	Club	Total	Points
1	Rune Holta	Tarnów	3,3,3,2,3	14
2	Tomasz Gollob	Tarnów	2,1,2,3,3	11+3
3	Damian Baliński	Leszno	2,2,3,2,2	11+2
4	Daniel Jeleniewski	Lublin	T,3,3,3,0	9
5	Rafał Dobrucki	Rzeszów	1,1,3,1,3	9
6	Janusz Kołodziej	Tarnów	2,3,1,2,1	9
7	Krystian Klecha	Bydgoszcz	1,2,1,3,2	9
8	Grzegorz Walasek	Zielona Góra	1,2,2,3,1	9
9	Sebastian Ułamek	Częstochowa	3,0,2,1,2	8
10	Piotr Protasiewicz	Zielona Góra	3,1,2,1,D	7
11	Rafał Okoniewski	Bydgoszcz	0,3,W,0,3	6
12	Adam Skórnicki	Poznań	3,2,1,0,U	6
13	Wiesław Jaguś	Toruń	2,0,0,2,2	6
14	Tomasz Jędrzejak	Wrocław	1,0,1,1,1	4
15	Piotr Świderski	Zielona Góra	0,1,0,0,1	2
16	Jacek Rempała	Tarnów	0,D,0,0,-	0
17	Mariusz Węgrzyk (res)	Ostrów	0	0

=== Golden Helmet ===
The 2007 Golden Golden Helmet (Polish: Turniej o Złoty Kask, ZK) organised by the Polish Motor Union (PZM) was the 2007 event for the league's leading riders. The final was held on the 6 June at Bydgoszcz. The meeting was stopped after 16 heats due to wet weather. Grzegorz Walasek was awarded the title because he was leading with 9 points and three race wins.

Pos.	Rider	Club	Total	Points
1	Grzegorz Walasek	Zielona Góra	0,3,3,3	9
2	Rafał Dobrucki	Rzeszów	2,1,3,3	9
3	Krzysztof Kasprzak	Leszno	3,2,2,2	9
4	Paweł Hlib	Gorzów	3,1,1,3	8
5	Piotr Protasiewicz	Zielona Góra	3,1,3,u	7
6	Jarosław Hampel	Leszno	2,2,d,3	7
7	Damian Baliński	Leszno	1,3,2,1	7
8	Wiesław Jaguś	Toruń	0,3,3,d	6
9	Sebastian Ułamek	Zielona Góra	3,1,2,d	6
10	Tomasz Gapiński	Wrocław	2,0,2,2	6
11	Tomasz Chrzanowski	Gdańsk	1,3,1,d	5
12	Adrian Miedziński	Toruń	1,2,0,2	5
13	Karol Ząbik	Toruń	0,2,0,2	4
14	Krzysztof Jabłoński	Gdańsk	2,0,0,1	3
15	Dariusz Śledź	Lublin	1,0,1,1	3
16	Rune Holta	Tarnów	d,0,1,-	1
17	Janusz Kołodziej (res)	Tarnów	1	1
18	Adrian Gomólski (res)	Gniezno	ns	

=== Criterium of Aces ===
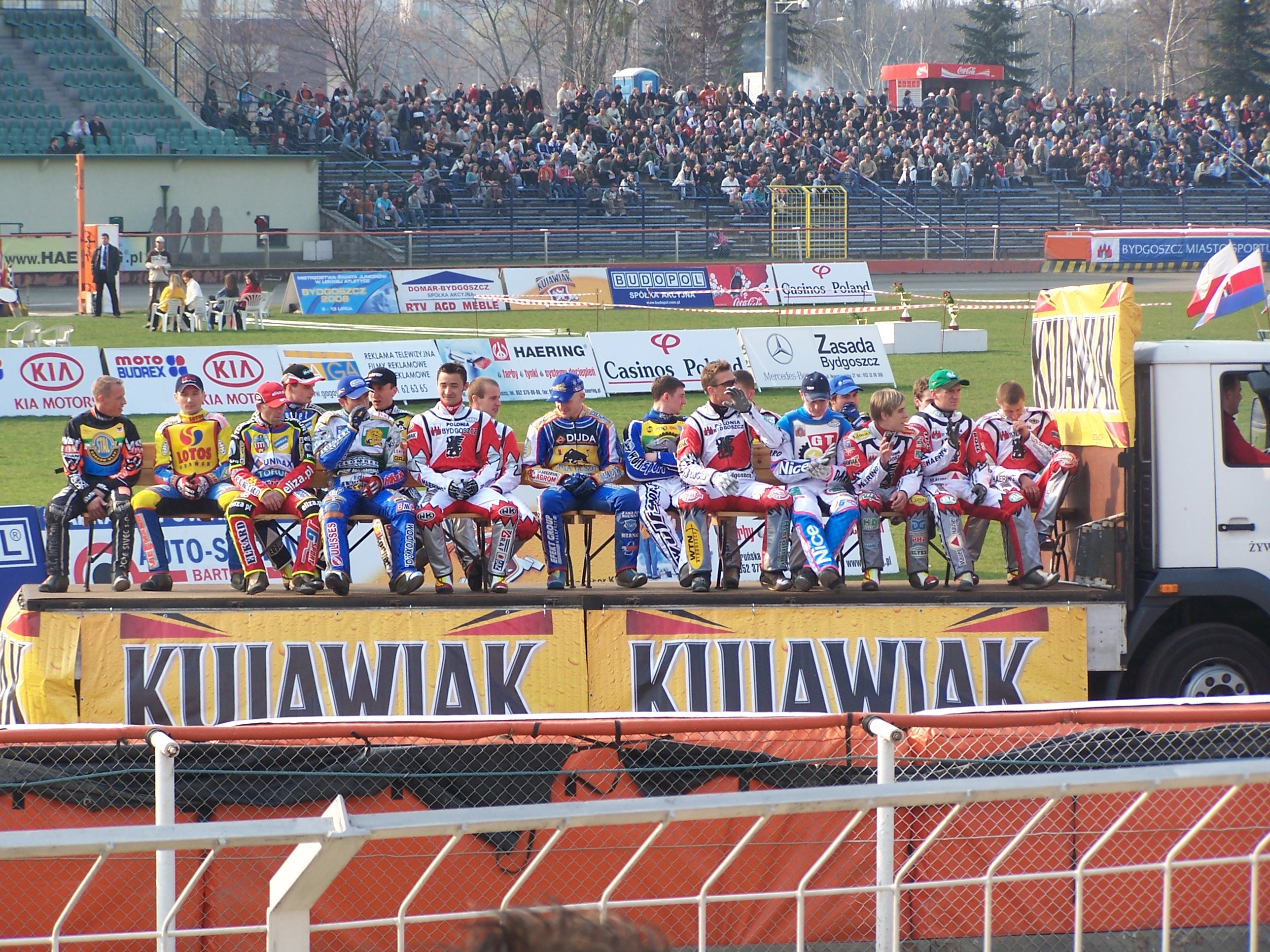
The riders parade before the Criterium of Aces

=== Junior Championship ===
- winner - Paweł Hlib

=== Silver Helmet ===
- winner - Marcin Jędrzejewski

=== Bronze Helmet ===
- winner - Adam Kajoch

== Pairs ==
=== Polish Pairs Speedway Championship ===
The 2007 Polish Pairs Speedway Championship was the 2007 edition of the Polish Pairs Speedway Championship. The final was held on 3 June at Lublin.

Pos	Team	Pts	Riders
1	Unia Tarnów	24	Tomasz Gollob 18, Rune Holta 6, Janusz Kołodziej 0
2	Atlas Wrocław	20+3	Tomasz Gapiński 13+3, Tomasz Jędrzejak 7
3	Unia Leszno	20+2	Krzysztof Kasprzak 12+2, Damian Baliński 8
4	Unibax Toruń	18	Adrian Miedziński 9, Robert Kościecha 9
5	Włókniarz Częstochowa	16	Sebastian Ułamek 0, Sławomir Drabik 15, Mateusz Szczepaniak 1
6	ZKŻ Zielona Góra	14	Piotr Świderski 6, Zbigniew Suchecki 8
7	Gdańsk	14	Tomasz Chrzanowski 10, Krzysztof Jabłoński 4, Grzegorz Knapp 0

== Team ==
=== Team Speedway Polish Championship ===
The 2007 Team Speedway Polish Championship was the 2007 edition of the Team Polish Championship. Unia Leszno won the gold medal for the second consecutive season.

==== Ekstraliga ====
First round

Pos	Club	Pld	W	D	L	Pts	Bon	Total	F / A	Diff
1	Unibax Toruń	14	10	1	3	21	7	28	678-557	+121
2	Unia Leszno	14	9	0	5	18	5	23	676-597	+79
3	Marma Polskie Folie Rzeszów	14	8	0	6	16	2	18	632-642	-10
4	Atlas Wrocław	14	6	0	8	12	4	16	630-597	+33
5	Złomrex Włókniarz Częstochowa	14	6	0	8	12	4	16	624-659	-35
6	Unia Tarnów	14	5	1	8	11	3	14	616-658	-42
7	ZKŻ Kronopol Zielona Góra	14	6	1	7	13	1	14	602-663	-61
8	Polonia Bydgoszcz	14	4	1	9	9	2	11	589-674	-85

Play-off's 1st-6th
Play-off's 7th-8th

Results

	BYD	CZE	LES	RZE	TAR	TOR	WRO	ZIE
Polonia Bydgoszcz	x	48:42	40:49	42:48	51:40	58:34	41:49	45:45
Włókniarz Częstochowa	50:40	x	38:55	58:35	50:43	39:54	50:42	47:43
Unia Leszno	54:36	53:40	x	55:35	52:41	44:46	50:43	50:40
Marma Rzeszów	52:39	48:42	49:41	x	47:43	50:40	47:46	55:34
Unia Tarnów	49:41	44:46	51:39	48:42	x	45:45	46:44	51:39
Unibax Toruń	60:32	54:39	49:44	54:39	58:35	x	40:0	52:41
Atlas Wrocław	59:30	54:39	42:47	52:40	56:37	58:35	x	44:46
ZKŻ Zielona Góra	43:46	46:44	47:43	48:45	48:43	33:57	49:41	x

Play-offs

quarter finals

- Toruń v Tarnów 107:78
- Leszno v Częstochowa 96:87
- Rzeszów v Wrocław 93:90

semi finals

- Toruń v Wrocław 92:87
- Leszno v Rzeszów 99:81

Final

- Toruń v Leszno 85:95

Relegation playoffs

- Zielona Góra v Ostrów 108:75

'Statistics'

Extended content
- Source: www.SportoweFakty.pl

Pos	Name	Club	Match	Heats	1st	2nd	3rd	4th	E	F	X	T	Pts	Bon	Total	Joker			CMA	Home	Away
1	(Denmark) Nicki Pedersen	RZE	17	89	73	9	5			1	1		259	1	260	34	2.730	15.29	10.92	2.805	2.667
2	(Australia) Leigh Adams	LES	18	96	65	19	10	1				1	246	10	256	6	2.635	14.22	10.54	2.761	2.520
3	(Poland) Tomasz Gollob	TAR	16	84	35	33	13	1			1	1	191	10	201	14	2.310	12.56	9.24	2.488	2.140
4	(Australia) Jason Crump	WRO	17	89	47	23	8	4	5		2		198	9	207	6	2.292	12.18	9.17	2.700	1.959
5	(Australia) Ryan Sullivan	TOR	19	100	43	29	20	6	1		1		210	15	225	6	2.220	11.84	8.88	2.362	2.094
6	(United States) Greg Hancock	CZE	16	82	39	20	16	5	1		1		179	8	187	12	2.207	11.69	8.83	2.308	2.116
7	(Poland) Rune Holta	TAR	16	87	39	24	17	5			1	1	193	9	202	22	2.195	12.63	8.78	2.293	2.109
8	(Denmark) Hans Andersen	WRO	18	93	35	32	20	5			1		192	15	207	6	2.194	11.50	8.77	2.224	2.159
9	(Poland) Wiesław Jaguś	TOR	17	87	41	22	16	7		1			186	5	191	6	2.161	11.24	8.64	2.275	2.064
10	(Poland) Krzysztof Kasprzak	LES	20	106	35	40	22	8			1		207	22	229		2.160	11.45	8.64	2.280	2.054
11	(Poland) Jarosław Hampel	LES	15	75	28	23	14	6	3			1	144	13	157		2.093	10.47	8.37	2.325	1.829
12	(Poland) Grzegorz Walasek	ZIE	16	84	39	17	18	7	2			1	169	3	172		2.048	10.75	8.19	2.171	1.930
13	(Sweden) Andreas Jonsson	BYD	11	58	18	23	11	4	1	1			115	6	121	8	2.017	11.00	8.07	2.065	1.963
14	(Poland) Piotr Protasiewicz	ZIE	16	85	28	32	15	4	3		3		167	8	175	8	2.012	10.94	8.05	1.829	2.182
15	(Poland) Karol Ząbik	TOR	19	95	36	21	21	13		1	3		171	18	189		1.989	9.95	7.96	2.200	1.800
16	(Poland) Damian Baliński	LES	20	97	21	36	27	12		1			162	30	193		1.979	9.60	7.92	2.286	1.667
17	(United Kingdom) Scott Nicholls	RZE	15	80	24	24	21	7	2			2	141	15	156		1.950	10.40	7.80	2.095	1.789
18	(Denmark) Kenneth Bjerre	WRO	18	94	27	31	19	9	4	1	2	1	165	19	184	6	1.926	10.22	7.70	2.059	1.767
19	(Czech Republic) Lukáš Dryml	CZE	8	39	8	16	11	1	1	1	1		67	6	73		1.872	9.13	7.49	2.211	1.550
20	(Poland) Janusz Kołodziej	TAR	16	85	18	29	28	8			2		142	18	160	4	1.859	10.00	7.44	1.900	1.822
21	(Denmark) Niels Kristian Iversen	ZIE	16	86	17	30	27	9	1		2		138	20	158		1.837	9.88	7.35	1.875	1.804
22	(Australia) Davey Watt	RZE	15	74	25	19	15	13	2				128	7	135		1.824	9.00	7.30	1.943	1.718
23	(Sweden) Fredrik Lindgren	ZIE	13	61	17	15	16	11	1		1		97	11	108		1.770	8.31	7.08	1.938	1.586
24	(Poland) Adrian Miedziński	TOR	18	83	14	25	26	9	3	1	4	1	118	23	141		1.699	7.83	6.80	2.044	1.289
25	(Poland) Rafał Dobrucki	RZE	20	103	24	31	27	18	2		1		162	13	175	2	1.689	8.75	6.76	1.882	1.500
26	(Sweden) Jonas Davidsson	BYD	9	41	11	9	11	8	1			1	62	7	69		1.683	7.67	6.73	1.400	1.952
27	(Australia) Chris Holder	WRO	12	62	14	17	18	12	1				94	10	104		1.677	8.67	6.71	1.680	1.676
28	(United Kingdom) Lee Richardson	CZE	15	74	14	18	25	12	5				109	20	129	12	1.662	8.60	6.65	1.722	1.605
29	(Poland) Rafał Okoniewski	BYD	15	78	17	22	21	12	4			2	116	12	128		1.641	8.53	6.56	1.973	1.341
30	(Poland) Tomasz Gapiński	WRO	18	80	13	24	23	16	1		1	2	110	20	130		1.625	7.22	6.50	2.049	1.179
31	(Poland) Sebastian Ułamek	CZE	15	74	19	19	19	12	2		2	1	120	6	126	12	1.622	8.40	6.49	1.750	1.471
32	(Poland) Tomasz Jędrzejak	WRO	15	63	5	19	21	14	2		2		74	25	99		1.571	6.60	6.29	1.839	1.313
33	(Poland) Krystian Klecha	BYD	12	45	8	10	15	9	2	1			59	9	68		1.511	5.67	6.04	1.667	1.278
34	(Australia) Troy Batchelor	LES	12	57	8	17	17	13				2	75	11	86		1.509	7.17	6.04	1.280	1.688
35	(Slovenia) Matej Žagar	TOR	17	80	13	19	22	22	2		1	1	99	20	119		1.488	7.00	5.95	1.548	1.421
36	(Russia) Emil Saifutdinov	BYD	9	41	6	10	13	9		3			51	9	60		1.463	6.67	5.85	1.833	1.174
37	(Poland) Krzysztof Buczkowski	BYD	13	56	12	13	13	14	2		2		77	6	83	4	1.446	6.38	5.79	1.586	1.296
38	(Poland) Michał Szczepaniak	BYD	15	70	7	24	14	23	1		1		83	15	98		1.400	6.53	5.60	1.632	1.125
39	(Poland) Mateusz Szczepaniak	CZE	16	69	6	15	26	21			1		74	22	96		1.391	6.00	5.57	1.206	1.571
40	(Poland) Sławomir Drabik	CZE	16	71	13	17	14	21	6				87	10	97		1.366	6.06	5.49	1.703	1.000
41	(Poland) Mariusz Staszewski	BYD	11	42	6	6	20	9	1				50	7	57		1.357	5.18	5.43	1.632	1.130
42	(Poland) Marcin Jędrzejewski	BYD	13	49	5	1	18	13			1	1	55	11	66		1.347	5.08	5.39	1.762	1.036
43	(Poland) Maciej Kuciapa	RZE	17	73	6	12	28	19	7		1		70	12	82		1.123	4.82	4.49	1.512	0.625
44	(Croatia) Jurica Pavlič	LES	14	52	6	6	13	24			1	2	43	9	52		1.000	3.71	4.00	1.290	0.571
45	(Poland) Jacek Rempała	TAR	10	38	5	3	12	17	1				33	3	36		0.947	3.60	3.79	1.625	0.455
46	(Poland) Grzegorz Zengota	ZIE	16	56	9	3	16	24	3		1		49	4	53		0.946	3.31	3.79	1.063	0.792
47	(Poland) Piotr Świderski	ZIE	9	33	1	5	12	14				1	25	6	31		0.939	3.44	3.76	1.158	0.643
48	(Poland) Paweł Miesiąc	RZE	13	50		8	21	17	2		2		37	8	45		0.900	3.46	3.60	1.120	0.680
49	(Poland) Kamil Zieliński	TAR	15	51	2	8	13	22	4	1		1	35	7	42		0.824	2.80	3.29	0.963	0.667
50	(Poland) Robert Kasprzak	LES	13	42	3	8	6	23			2		31	3	34		0.810	2.62	3.24	0.727	0.900
51	(Poland) Marcin Leś	RZE	19	69	3	15	10	39	1		1		49	4	53		0.768	2.79	3.07	1.194	0.421
52	(Poland) Robert Kościecha	TOR	8	40	9	14	10	5	1	1			65	5	70		1.750	8.75	7.00	1.933	1.640
53	(Poland) Krzysztof Słaboń	WRO	7	31	5	10	7	8			1		42	7	49		1.581	7.00	6.32	1.750	1.000
54	(Sweden) Peter Ljung	TAR	6	21	6	2	5	5	2		1		27	5	32		1.524	5.33	6.10	2.167	0.667
55	(Sweden) Robin Törnqvist	TOR	1	2			2						2	1	3		1.500	3.00	6.00		1.500
56	(Czech Republic) Filip Šitera	WRO	5	25	3	5	11	5			1		30	5	35		1.400	7.00	5.60	1.400
57	(Sweden) Antonio Lindbäck	CZE	7	28	1	12	7	5	1			2	34	4	38		1.357	5.43	5.43	1.400	1.333
58	(Poland) Alan Marcinkowski	TOR	19	38	2	10	11	14	1				37	13	50		1.316	2.63	5.26	1.857	1.000
59	(United Kingdom) Edward Kennett	CZE	9	30	3	8	8	11					33	6	39		1.300	4.33	5.20	1.316	1.273
60	(Poland) Borys Miturski	CZE	3	4	1		2	1					5		5		1.250	1.67	5.00	1.333	1.000
61	(Poland) Jacek Gollob	TAR	8	32	6	5	7	13	1				35	4	39		1.219	4.88	4.88	1.407	0.200
62	(Poland) Zbigniew Suchecki	ZIE	5	19	1	2	8	8					15	6	21		1.105	4.20	4.42	1.385	0.500
63	(Czech Republic) Aleš Dryml, Jr.	TOR	9	37	3	4	15	11	3			1	32	7	39		1.054	4.33	4.22	1.190	0.875
64	(Poland) Robert Miśkowiak	LES	10	34	2	5	11	16					27	7	34		1.000	3.40	4.00	0.875	1.111
65	(Poland) Mateusz Jurga	LES	2	4	1		1	2					4		4		1.000	2.00	4.00	1.000	1.000
66	(Denmark) Patrick Hougaard	LES	1	2			1	1					1	1	2		1.000	2.00	4.00		1.000
67	(Sweden) Ricky Kling	ZIE	6	21	3	2	3	13					16	3	19		0.905	3.17	3.62	1.167	0.800
68	(Sweden) Sebastian Aldén	ZIE	2	8		2	2	3			1		6	1	7		0.875	3.50	3.50	1.250	0.500
69	(Poland) Adam Kajoch	LES	10	35	2	7	6	19			1		26	4	30		0.857	3.00	3.43	1.000	0.706
70	(Germany) Kevin Wölbert	ZIE	10	24	3	3	4	13			1		19	1	20		0.833	2.00	3.33	1.462	0.091
71	(Russia) Daniil Ivanov	TAR	5	22		3	9	8		1		1	15	3	18		0.818	3.60	3.27	0.833	0.800
72	(Denmark) Nicolai Klindt	WRO	3	15	1	1	4	9					9	3	12		0.800	4.00	3.20	0.000	1.091
73	(Poland) Andrzej Głuchy	TAR	8	26	1	2	5	11	2	3	1	1	12	2	14		0.538	1.75	2.15	0.889	0.353
74	(Poland) Dawid Lampart	RZE	10	30	1	1	7	12	2	1	4	2	12	4	16		0.533	1.60	2.13	0.722	0.250
75	(Poland) Mateusz Szostek	RZE	5	10	1	1		8					5		5		0.500	1.00	2.00	0.333	2.000
76	(United States) Billy Hamill	ZIE	1	4		1		2	1				2		2		0.500	2.00	2.00		0.500
77	(Poland) Maciej Janowski	WRO	6	7			3	4					3		3		0.429	0.50	1.71	0.667	0.250
78	(Sweden) Andreas Messing	RZE	7	24		2	5	12	3		1	1	9	1	10		0.417	1.43	1.67	0.556	0.333
79	(Poland) Damian Stachowiak	TOR	1	5			2	3					2		2		0.400	2.00	1.60		0.400
80	(Poland) Marcin Rempała	TAR	8	31	1	1	5	19	5				10	2	12		0.387	1.50	1.55	0.571	0.235
81	(Poland) Piotr Korbel	WRO	12	12			4	6		1		1	4		4		0.333	0.33	1.33	0.286	0.400
82	(United Kingdom) Lewis Bridger	CZE	6	9	1			8					3		3		0.333	0.50	1.33	0.000	0.500
83	(Czech Republic) Hynek Stichauer	TAR	3	5			1	3				1	1		1		0.200	0.33	0.80	0.500	0.000
84	(Australia) Travis McGowan	LES	2	4				2	1		1		0		0		0.000	0.00	0.00	0.000
85	(Poland) Damian Celmer	TOR	1	3				3					0		0		0.000	0.00	0.00		0.000
86	(Poland) Marcin Piekarski	CZE	1	3				3					0		0		0.000	0.00	0.00	0.000
87	(Australia) Steve Johnston	TOR	1	2				2					0		0		0.000	0.00	0.00	0.000
88	(Poland) Szymon Kiełbasa	TAR	1	2				2					0		0		0.000	0.00	0.00	0.000
89	(Poland) Mateusz Jaworski	WRO	1	1				1					0		0		0.000	0.00	0.00		0.000
Pos	Name	Club	Match	Heats	1st	2nd	3rd	4th	E	F	X	T	Pts	Bon	Total	Joker			CMA	Home	Away

==== 1.Liga ====
Pos	Team	P	W	D	L	Diff	Pts	BP	Total
1	Stal Gorzów Wielkopolski	14	10	0	4	212	20	3	23
2	Ostrów Wielkopolski	14	9	0	5	46	18	3	21
3	Wybrzeże Gdańsk	14	9	0	5	102	18	2	20
4	RKM Rybnik	14	7	0	7	48	14	2	16
5	PSŻ Poznań	14	7	0	7	-86	14	1	15
6	GTŻ Grudziądz	14	6	1	7	-55	13	0	13
7	TŻ Lublin	14	5	0	9	-35	10	1	11
8	Start Gniezno	14	2	1	11	-232	5	0	5

Play offs

Semi finals

- Rybnik - Gorzów Wlkp. 1–2
- Gdańsk - Ostrów Wlkp. 1–2

final

- Ostrów Wlkp. - Gorzów Wlkp. 56–36, 40–49, 41–49

==== 2.Liga ====
Pos	Team	P	W	D	L	Diff	Pts	BP	Total
1	Kolejarz Rawicz	12	9	0	3	148	18	3	21
2	Lokomotiv Daugavpils (Latvia)	12	8	2	2	150	18	2	20
3	Orzeł Łódź	12	8	0	4	119	16	3	19
4	Kolejarz Opole	12	6	0	6	83	12	1	13
5	Speedway Miskolc (Hungary)	12	4	1	7	–104	9	0	9
6	KSM Krosno	12	3	2	7	–140	8	1	9
7	AK Markéta Prague (Czech Republic)	12	1	1	10	–256	3	0	3
