= Paweł Hlib =

Polish motorcycle speedway rider (born 1986)

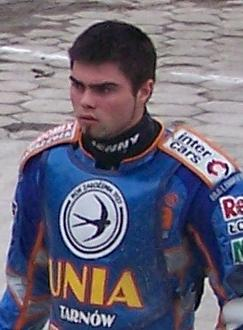
- Born: 20 February 1986 (age 40); Poland
- Nationality: Polish

Career history

Poland
- 2002–2005, 2007–2008, 2013: Gorzów
- 2006: Tarnów
- 2009: Rybnik
- 2010–2011: Gdańsk
- 2012, 2019: Krosno
- 2013: Kraków

Denmark
- 2004–2006: Brovst

Sweden
- 2005, 2007: Kaparna
- 2006: Västervik

Great Britain
- 2006: Coventry

Individual honours
- 2007: Polish Under-21 Champion

Team honours
- 2005, 2006, 2007: Team U-21 World Champion

Paweł Hlib (born 20 February 1986 in Poland) is a former motorcycle speedway rider from Poland.

== Career ==
Hlib won the Team Speedway Junior World Championship in 2005, 2006 and 2007 and became the Individual Polish Under-21 Champion in 2007.

In 2004, Hilb was due to make his debut for Eastbourne Eagles in the British leagues but changed his mind about riding for them. However in 2006, he joined Coventry Bees for the 2006 Elite League speedway season.

In December 2008, Hilb joined the Poland national team. He stated that he would like to join the German team because he has German citizenship as well.

Hilb returned to ride in Poland during 2019, for Wilki Krosno. It was his final season in Poland.

== Results ==
=== World Championship ===
- Individual U-21 World Championship
  - 2006 - bronze medal
  - 2007 - Champion
- Team U-21 World Championship (Under-21 World Cup)
  - 2005 - World Champion (12 points in Semi-Final)
  - 2006 - World Champion (12 points)
  - 2007 - World Champion (10 points)

=== European Championship ===
- Individual U-19 European Championship
  - 2003 - 11th place
  - 2005 - 4th place

=== Polish competitions ===
- Individual U-21 Polish Championship
  - 2006 - Bronze medal
  - 2007 - Polish Champion
- Silver Helmet (U-21)
  - 2004 - Silver medal
  - 2005 - Silver medal

== See also ==
- Poland national speedway team
- Speedway in Poland
