= Marian Rose =

Polish speedway rider

- Born: 15 August 1933; Toruń, Poland
- Died: 19 April 1970 (aged 36); Rzeszów, Poland
- Nationality: Polish

Career history
- 1958-1970: KS Toruń

Team honours
- 1966: Speedway World Team Cup gold medal

Marian Rose (1933-1970) was an international motorcycle speedway rider from Poland.

== Speedway career ==
Rose won a gold medal in the Speedway World Team Cup in the 1966 Speedway World Team Cup. Also in 1966, he competed in Continental Speedway final during the 1966 Individual Speedway World Championship.

Rose was killed in a race at the Stal Rzeszów Speedway Circuit on 19 April 1970, following a combination of hitting his head when falling off his bike and another rider crashing into him at the same time.

The Motoarena Toruń im. Mariana Rosego in Poland is named after Rose and in 2023 a book was published about his life.

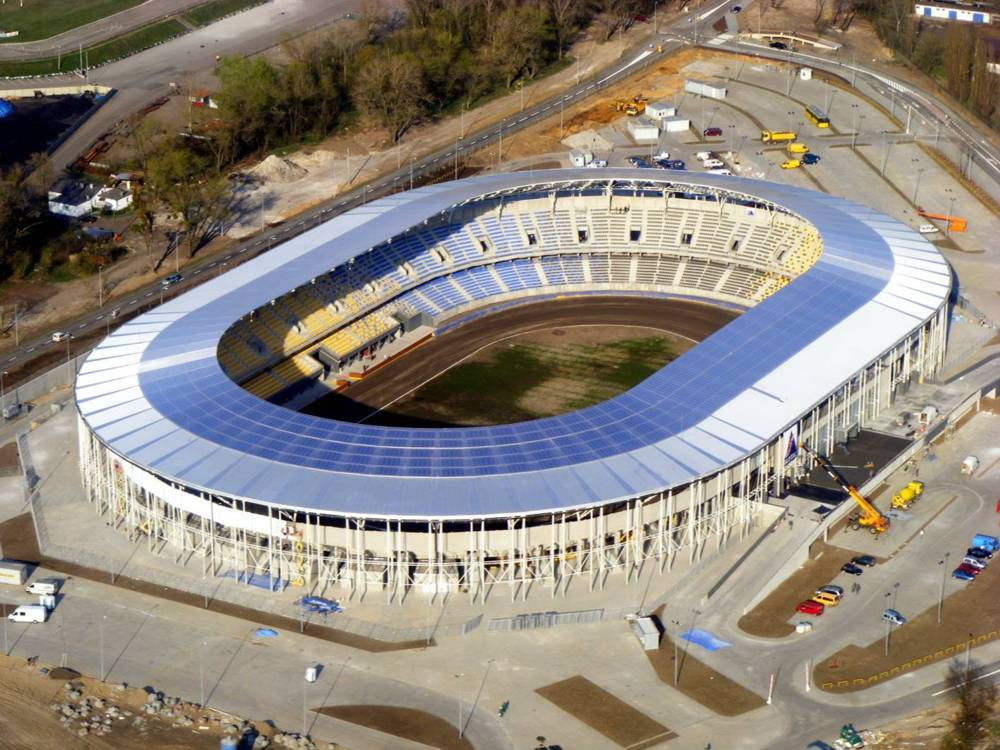
The Motoarena Toruń im. Mariana Rosego is named after him

== World final appearances ==
=== Individual World Championship ===
- 1965 - (England) London, Wembley Stadium - Reserve - Did not ride

=== World Team Cup ===
- 1964 - (West Germany) Abensberg, Abensberg Stadion (with Andrzej Wyglenda / Andrzej Pogorzelski / Zbigniew Podlecki / Marian Kaiser) - 4th - 16pts (2)
- 1966 - (Poland) Wrocław, Olympic Stadium (with Andrzej Pogorzelski / Andrzej Wyglenda / Antoni Woryna / Edmund Migoś) - Winner - 41pts (10)

== See also ==
Rider deaths in motorcycle speedway
