= Team Speedway Junior Polish Championship =

The Team Speedway Polish Championship (Polish: Drużynowe Mistrzostwa Polski, DMP) is an annual speedway event held each year in different Polish clubs organized by the Polish Motor Union (PZM) since 1978.

The team winning the league is awarded a gold medal and declared Polish Team Champions. Teams finishing second and third are awarded silver and bronze medals respectively.

== PZM Cup Winners ==
Year		Winners	2nd place	3rd place
1976	Bydgoszcz	Polonia Bydgoszcz	Kolejarz Opole	Motor Lublin
1977	Opole	Unia Leszno	Kolejarz Opole	Polonia Bydgoszcz

== Previous winners ==
Year		Winners	2nd place	3rd place
1978	Bydgoszcz; Częstochowa; Leszno; Gdańsk	Unia Leszno	Wybrzeże Gdańsk	Polonia Bydgoszcz
1979	Zielona Góra; Toruń; Leszno; Rzeszów	Unia Leszno	Stal Toruń	Falubaz Zielona Góra
1980	Gniezno; Wrocław; Zielona Góra; Gdańsk	Falubaz Zielona Góra	Wybrzeże Gdańsk	Start Gniezno
1983	Tarnów	Wybrzeże Gdańsk	Unia Leszno	Unia Tarnów
1984	Lublin	Motor Lublin	ROW Rybnik	Wybrzeże Gdańsk
1985	Toruń	Apator Toruń	Unia Leszno	Stal Gorzów Wlkp.
1986	Zielona Góra	Stal Gorzów Wlkp.	Polonia Bydgoszcz	Falubaz Zielona Góra
1987	Gorzów Wlkp.	Falubaz Zielona Góra	Stal Gorzów Wlkp.	Polonia Bydgoszcz
1988	Bydgoszcz	Falubaz Zielona Góra	Polonia Bydgoszcz	Apator Toruń
1989	Rzeszów	Polonia Bydgoszcz	Apator Toruń	Stal Rzeszów
1990	Tarnów	Apator Toruń	Unia Tarnów	Motor Lublin
Year		Winners	2nd place	3rd place
1991	Grudziądz	Unia-Rolnicki Tarnów	GKM Grudziądz	Stal Gorzów Wlkp.
1992	Bydgoszcz	Apator Toruń	Polonia Bydgoszcz	Sparta-Aspro Wrocław
1993	Wrocław	Unia Tarnów	Apator-Elektrim Toruń	Sparta-Polsat Wrocław
1994	Rzeszów	Stal Rzeszów	Stal-Brunat Gorzów Wlkp.	Apator-Elektrim Toruń
1995	Gorzów Wlkp.	Stal-Van Pur Rzeszów	Polonia Piła	Stal-Michael Gorzów Wlkp.
1996	Częstochowa	Włókniarz-Malma Częstochowa	Stal-Van Pur Rzeszów	Unia Leszno
1997	Grudziądz	BB-GKM Grudziądz	Polonia-Philips Piła	Unia Leszno
1998	Gniezno	Trilux-Start Gniezno	Polonia Piła	Kuntersztyn-GKM Grudziądz
1999	Piła	Pergo Gorzów Wlkp.	Ludwik-Polonia Piła	Apator-Netia Toruń
2000	Rybnik	Radson-Malma Włókniarz Częstochowa	RKM Rybnik	ZKŻ Polmos Zielona Góra
Year		Winners	2nd place	3rd place
2001	Leszno	Unia Leszno	BGŻ S.A.-Polonia Piła	RKM Rybnik
2002	Bydgoszcz	RKM Rybnik	BGŻ S.A.-Polonia Piła	Point'S-Polonia Bydgoszcz
2003	Zielona Góra	Polonia Piła	Top Secret-Włókniarz Częstochowa	ZKŻ Quick-mix Zielona Góra
2004	Tarnów	Apator-Adriana Toruń	Stal-TeleNet Strabag Gorzów Wlkp.	Unia Tarnów
2005	Rzeszów	Apator-Adriana Toruń	Unia Tarnów	ZKŻ Kronopol Zielona Góra
2006	Rzeszów	Marma Polskie Folie Rzeszów	Unia Leszno	RKM Rybnik
2007	Rybnik	RKM Rybnik	Stal Gorzów Wlkp.	Marma Polskie Folie Rzeszów
2008	Leszno	Unia Leszno	RKM Rybnik	Złomrex Włókniarz Częstochowa
2009	Toruń	Unibax Toruń	Caelum Stal Gorzów Wlkp.	Unia Leszno
2010	TBD			
Year		Winners	2nd place	3rd place
