= 2008 Polish speedway season =

Motorcycle racing competition

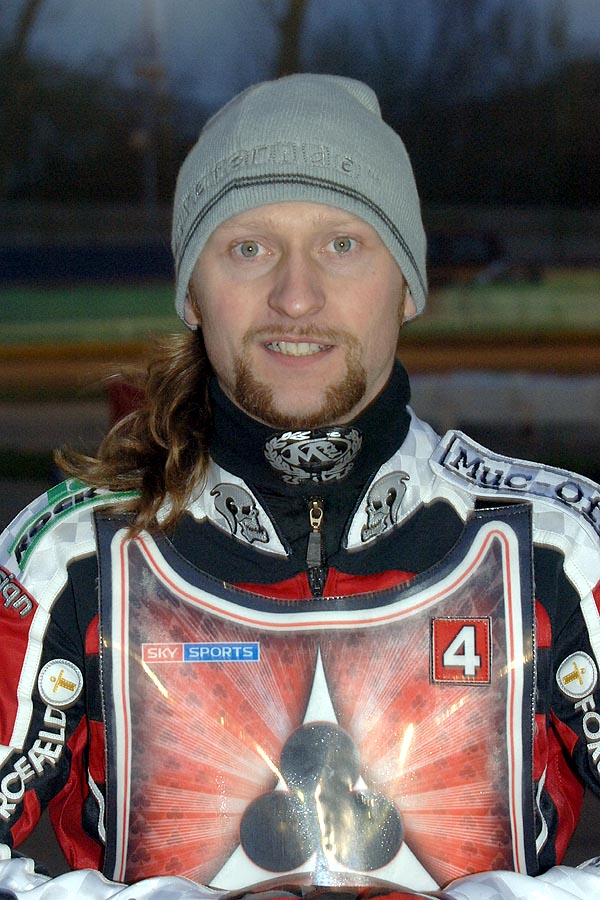
- Adam Skórnicki became the Polish champion

The 2008 Polish Speedway season was the 2008 season of motorcycle speedway in Poland.

== Individual ==
=== Silver Helmet ===
- winner - Maciej Janowski

=== Bronze Helmet ===
- winner - Artur Mroczka

== Pairs ==
=== Polish Pairs Speedway Championship ===
The 2008 Polish Pairs Speedway Championship was the 2008 edition of the Polish Pairs Speedway Championship. The final was held on 5 September at Toruń.

Pos	Team	Pts	Riders
1	Unibax Toruń	24	Wiesław Jaguś 12, Robert Kościecha 12
2	Unia Leszno	23+3	Damian Baliński 9, Krzysztof Kasprzak 14+3
3	ZKŻ Zielona Góra	23+2	Grzegorz Walasek 16+2, Grzegorz Zengota 7
4	Włókniarz Częstochowa	21	Sebastian Ułamek 14, Michał Szczepaniak 7
5	PSŻ Poznań	15	Adam Skórnicki 14, Alan Marcinkowski 0, Daniel Pytel 1
6	GTŻ Grudziądz	10	Mariusz Puszakowski 6, Paweł Staszek 1, Kamil Brzozowski 3
7	RKM Rybnik	9	Michał Mitko 1, Maciej Kuciapa 8

== Team ==
=== Team Speedway Polish Championship ===
The 2008 Team Speedway Polish Championship was the 2008 edition of the Team Polish Championship. Unibax Toruń won the gold medal.

==== 1.Liga ====
Pos	Club	M	W	D	L	Pts	Bon	Total	+/-
1	Polonia Bydgoszcz	20	16	0	4	32	10	42	+298
2	Lotos Gdańsk	20	13	1	6	27	6	33	+145
3	Ostrów Wlkp. (-7 pts)	20	13	0	7	26	7	26	+161
4	PSŻ Poznań	20	8	1	11	17	4	21	-88
5	Lokomotiv Daugavpils (Latvia)	20	11	0	9	22	4	26	+5
6	RKM Rybnik	20	9	0	11	18	6	24	+72
7	GTŻ Grudziądz	20	8	0	12	16	3	19	-126
8	Kolejarz Rawicz	20	1	0	19	2	-	2	-467

==== 2.Liga ====
Pos	Club	M	W	D	L	Pts	Bon	Total	+/-
1	Start Gniezno	16	12	1	3	25	7	32	+278
2	Speedway Miskolc (Hungary)	16	10	0	6	20	6	26	+70
3	Rivne Speedway (Ukraine)	16	9	0	7	18	3	21	-53
4	Orzeł Łódź	16	4	1	11	9	3	12	-89
5	Kolejarz Opole	10	3	0	7	6	1	7	-51
6	KSM Krosno	10	3	0	7	6	-	6	-155

==== Play-offs ====
Ekstraliga and First League

- October 12: Gdańsk - Rzeszów 54:37
- October 19: Rzeszów - Gdańsk 47:45
- Rzeszów - Gdańsk 84:99

First League and Second League

- October 12: Miskolc - Grudziądz 0:60 (wo)
- October 19: Grudziądz - Miskolc 60:0 (wo)
- Grudziądz - Miskolc 120:0

==== Amateur League ====
Pos	Team	Match	Points	+/-
1	AKŻ Lublin	6	10	+80
2	CKM Włókniarz Częstochowa	6	8	+35
3	AKS Leszczyńskie Byki Leszno	6	4	-59
4	AKŻ Old Boys Speedway Bydgoszcz	6	2	-56
