= KS Toruń =

Polish motorcycle speedway team

Club information
- Track address: MotoArena Toruń im. Mariana Rose
- Country: Poland
- Founded: 1962
- Team manager: Piotr Baron
- Team captain: Robert Lambert
- League: Ekstraliga
- Website: speedway.torun.pl

Club facts
- Colours: Yellow, Blue, White
- Track size: 318 metres (348 yd)
- Track record time: 56.50 second
- Track record date: 20 August 2017
- Track record holder: Jack Holder

Major team honours
Team champions	1986, 1990, 2001, 2008, 2025, 2026
Pairs champions	1986, 2004, 2008, 2010

KS Toruń, currently competing as PRES Grupa Deweloperska Toruń, is a Polish motorcycle speedway team from Toruń. The team currently competes in the Ekstraliga (the highest division) and have won the Team Speedway Polish Championship six times (as of 2026).

== Team information ==
- Name: Klub Sportowy Toruń SA
- Address: 87-100 Toruń, ul. Pera Jonssona 7
- Home track: Pera Jonssona 7, Toruń
- Home arena capacity: 15,500

== History ==
=== 1930 to 1945 ===
Speedway motorcycles came to Toruń as early as the 1930, where they raced in classes according to engine size. The sport, called "Dirt-track" at the time, carried on in Toruń up until World War II.

=== 1946 to 1956 ===
Immediately after the war, racing resumed and the Toruń's Motorcycle Club (Toruński Klub Motocyklowy) was formed. The speedway team saw its first race in 1950, when races were moved from the Bema street Municipal Stadium to the then Military Stadium at Ulica Broniewskiego.

=== 1957 to 1961 ===
In 1957, due to regulatory requirements, a major renovation took place and the new facilities opened on 20 October 1957. The stadium was now named after Zbigniew Raniszewski, a Toruń speedway rider who lost his life in a race in Vienna on 21 April 1956. From 1957, the speedway club operated under the Friends of Soldiers League (Liga Przyjaciół Żołnierza), and one year later Toruń officially raced under the league and won with Unia Leszno. During the 1959 Polish speedway season, the riders from Copernicus's birthplace appeared in the third league placing second to last (7th). In 1960, they continued to race as LPŻ Toruń but placed last and in 1961 a team called MKŻ Toruń finished 7th.

=== 1962 to 1975 ===
In 1962, a speedway club named Stal Toruń was founded and competed in the second league. In 1966, their leading rider Marian Rose won the silver medal at the Polish Individual Speedway Championship. Rose helped riders like Jan Ząbik, Janusz Plewiński, Roman Kościecha and Bogdan Szuluk, but he died after a crash during a match at the Stal Rzeszów Municipal Stadium on 19 April 1970. Meanwhile the club continued to compete in the second division for 14 years.

=== 1976 to 1985 ===
In 1976 the first league was rebuilt into ten teams and Toruń received a promotion. A young talented rider Kazimierz Araszewicz died in a crash during the 1976 season. The team began to race as Apator Toruń after the Apator Sports Club and continued to compete in the highest division. They won a silver medal in the pairs during 1981 and the team gained their first honours in 1983, after taking the team championship bronze medal. Wojciech Żabiałowicz won the 1985 Golden Helmet.

=== 1986 to 1999 ===
In 1986, KS Apator Toruń won their first Polish champion title, overtaking rivals Polonia Bydgoszcz at the end of the season. The team consisted of riders such as Zabiałowicz, Eugeniusz Miastkowski, Grzegorz Śniegowski and Stanisław Miedziński. Zabiałowicz and Śniegowski also won the pairs championship. The team grew to become one of the best speedway teams in Poland, winning the 1990 gold medal with a team that included Żabiałowicz, Jacek Krzyżaniak, Mirosław Kowalik and Robert Sawina.

They then won four consecutive bronze medals followed by two silver medals from 1991 to 1996. The 1990 world champion Per Jonsson was instrumental in much of the success. In-between in 1994, the stadium was renamed again, taking the name of Marian Rose.

=== 2000 to 2008 ===
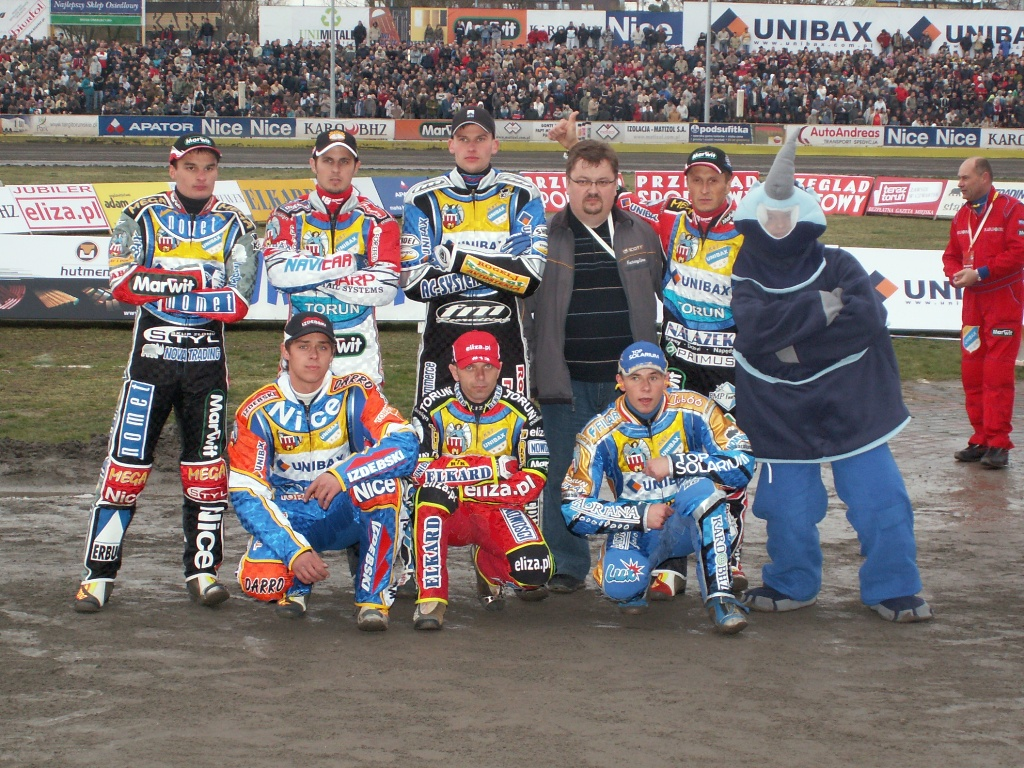
2007 Toruń team

Toruń were inaugural members of the Ekstraliga in 2000 and in 2001, signed Tony Rickardsson, which instantly saw success as Toruń won their third gold medal. The Polish championship title in 2001 lasted to the final heat of the final match against Atlas Wrocław, with Toruń's riders winning the heat 5-1. They secured two silver medals in 2003 and 2007 but in between the team was bought by a trader Roman Karkosik and the name was changed to Unibax Toruń.

Plans for a new speedway stadium arose in 2008 and the last league match held at the KS Apator Stadium was a league match against Unia Leszno during the 2008 season, played on 19 October. A fourth gold medal was won during the 2008 season and Wiesław Jaguś and Robert Kościecha also won the pairs.

=== 2009 to 2020 ===
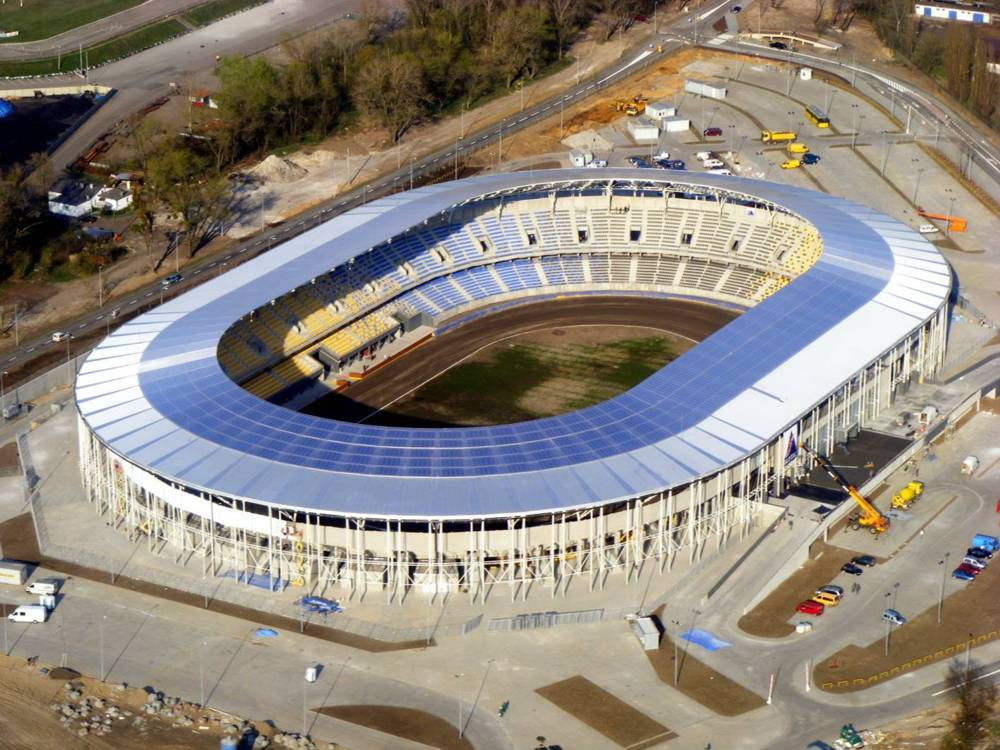
MotoArena Toruń, the team's home venue since 2009

Racing from a new home, the MotoArena Toruń, the club won three more silver medals and two more bronze medals but in 2019, the club suffered its first relegation after 44 successive years in the top league. However, the team won the 2020 1.Liga to gain a quick promotion back to the Ekstraliga.

=== 2021 to present ===
From 2021 until 2024 the team qualified for the play offs, with Robert Lambert and Patryk Dudek leading the way. For the 2025 Polish speedway season, Emil Sayfutdinov and Mikkel Michelsen were added to the squad and Toruń became champions of Poland for the fifth time.

== Notable riders ==
- (Australia) Jason Crump
- (Australia) Jason Doyle
- (Poland) Patryk Dudek
- (United States) Greg Hancock
- (Australia) Chris Holder
- (Australia) Jack Holder
- (Poland) Wiesław Jaguś
- (Sweden) Per Jonsson
- (Poland) Mirosław Kowalik
- (Poland) Jacek Krzyżaniak
- (United Kingdom) Robert Lambert
- (United Kingdom) Mark Loram
- (Poland) Adrian Miedziński
- (Denmark) Mikkel Michelsen
- (Sweden) Tony Rickardsson
- (Poland) Marian Rose
- (Russia) Emil Sayfutdinov
- (Australia) Ryan Sullivan
- (Australia) Darcy Ward
- (Poland) Jan Ząbik
- (Poland) Karol Ząbik
- (Poland) Wojciech Żabiałowicz

== Honours ==
Competitions	Total	Golden medals		Silver medals		Bronze medals
Competitions	Total	Total	Years	Total	Years	Total	Years
Team (DMP) (since 1948)	22	6	1986, 1990, 2001, 2008, 2025, 2026	7	1995, 1996, 2003, 2007, 2009, 2013, 2016	9	1983, 1991, 1992, 1993, 1994, 2010, 2012, 2023, 2024
Team U-21 (MDMP) (since 1978)	14	6	1985, 1990, 1992, 2004, 2005, 2009	4	1979, 1989, 1993, 2026	4	1988, 1994, 1999, 2017
Pairs (MPPK) (since 1974)	17	4	1986, 2004, 2008, 2010	5	1981, 1997, 2002, 2014, 2024	8	1991, 1992, 1993, 1995, 1996, 2003, 2016, 2025
Pairs U-21 (MMPPK) (1980 U-23; since 1983)	14	5	1990, 1991, 1992, 1993, 2007	3	1980, 2010, 2013	6	1994, 1995, 2000, 2004, 2014, 2017
Individual (IMP) (since 1948)	12	3	1987, 1997, 2025	6	1966, 1986, 1993, 1994, 2006, 2024	3	1992, 1998, 2023
Individual U-21 (MIMP) (since 1967)	20	5	1993, 1996, 2005, 2006, 2018	8	1969, 1992, 2000, 2003, 2006, 2007, 2013, 2016	7	1967, 1971, 1980, 1991, 1993, 1999, 2005
Total Polish Championship medals: 99		Gold: 29		Silver: 33		Bronze: 37
Competitions	Total	I place		II place		III place
Competitions	Total	Total	Years	Total	Years	Total	Years
European Club (KPE) (since 1998)	2			1	2009	1	2002
Team Cup (DPP) (?)	5	4	1993, 1996, 1997, 1998	1	1999
Golden Helmet (ZK) (since 1961)	15	3	1985, 2004, 2011	5	1982, 1986, 1987, 2010, 2013	7	1981, 1992, 1994, 1995, 2008, 2021, 2022
Silver Helmet U-21 (SK) (since 1966)	10	3	1996, 2004, 2006	1	1992	6	1967, 1980, 1991, 1992, 1994, 2000
Bronze Helmet U-19 (BK) (1976-81; since 1983)	6	2	1994, 2004	2	1993, 1999	2	1977, 1988

== Team and sponsor names ==
- TKM Toruń (1926–1939)
- TKM Toruń (1946–1949)
- Gwardia Toruń (1949–1954)
- TKM LPŻ Toruń (1954–1960)
- MKŻ LPŻ Toruń (1961)
- KS Stal przy PZWANN (1962–?)
  - Sekcja Żużlowa Apator
- KS Stal-Apator (?–1980)
- KS Apator (1980–2005)
  - Apator Toruń (1980–1993)
  - Apator Elektrim Toruń (1993–1996)
  - Apator DGG Toruń (1996–1998)
  - Apator Netia Toruń (1999–2000)
  - Apator Adriana Toruń (2001–2005)
- KS Toruń (2005–2006)
  - Adriana Toruń (2006)
- KS Toruń Unibax SA (2006–2014)
- KS Toruń SA (2014–)
  - KS Toruń (2015)
  - Get Well Toruń (2016–2019)
  - eWinner Apator Toruń (2020–2021)
  - For Nature Solutions Apator Toruń (2022)
  - For Nature Solutions KS Apator Toruń (2023)
  - KS Apator Toruń (2024)
  - PRES Grupa Deweloperska Toruń (2025–)
