= Włókniarz Częstochowa =

Polish motorcycle speedway team

Club information
- Track address: Arena Częstochowa; Częstochowa
- Country: Poland
- Founded: 1946
- Team manager: Lech Kedziora
- Team captain: Leon Madsen
- League: Ekstraliga
- Website: Official Website

Club facts
- Colours: White and Green
- Nickname: Lions
- Track size: 359 metres (393 yd)
- Track record time: 61.26 seconds
- Track record date: 7 August 2020
- Track record holder: Martin Vaculik

Major team honours
Team Polish Champions	1959, 1974, 1996, 2003
tier 2 champions	1956, 1964, 1965, 1965/66, 1999
Pairs champions	2006
European Cup	1 time (2004)
Individual Polish Champion	5 times (most recent 2004)
Team Polish Cup	1 time (1994)

Włókniarz Częstochowa is a motorcycle speedway team based in Częstochowa, Poland. They were established in 1946 and the team's home track is at the Arena Częstochowa, which has a capacity of over 16,850 people. The team currently competes in the Ekstraliga (the highest division) and have won the Team Speedway Polish Championship four times.

== History ==
=== 1948 to 1955 ===
The first club in the city was CTCiM Częstochowa who competed in the inaugural 1948 Polish speedway season and 1949 season. During the 1950 Polish speedway season the club appeared in the second division under the name used today. In 1951, they were selected to compete in a single division. However, in 1953 they were effectively relegated as one of four teams that would form part of the new second league.

=== 1956 to 1969 ===
During the 1956 Polish speedway season the team won their first honours by becoming the second division champions and this would kick start a golden period for the club. In 1959, the team won the gold medal for the Team Speedway Polish Championship and Stefan Kwoczała won the Polish Individual Speedway Championship.

In 1961, the team suffered relegation but won the second division in 1964 and 1965. Bizarrely the team were not promoted until after the 1966 season because there was a system in place at the time that collated results from 1963 and 1964 combined and then 1965 and 1966 combined to determine promotion. Relegation ensued in 1969.

=== 1970 to 1999 ===
After promotion in 1971 the club began to grow in prominences. In 1974, the team won their second gold medal and then won successive silver medals in 1975 and 1976 and Marek Cieślak won the gold medal in the 1976 Golden Helmet. Bronze medals were won in 1977 and 1978 ending a period of continued success. The entire decade of the 1980s passed without success and it was not until 1991 that Sławomir Drabik won the double of Polish champion and Golden Helmet winner. Drabik spearheaded the team when they won the 1996 play offs during the 1996 Polish speedway season to win the gold medal for the third time. Drabik won the Polish title again and the team also included Joe Screen and Sebastian Ułamek. After relegation in 1997 the team were promoted in 1999.

=== 2000 to present ===
Włókniarz Częstochow were inaugural members of the Ekstraliga in 2000. In 2003, their fourth gold medal and Rune Holta won the Polish title. The 2003 team contained the likes of Holta, Ryan Sullivan, Andreas Jonsson and Grzegorz Walasek. The team won the European Club Cup once in 2004.

Ulamek and Drabik won the 2006 Polish Pairs Speedway Championship and the club continued to compete in the Ekstraliga until 2015 when they failed to compete in the Polish leagues for the first time in their history. In 2016, they returned in the second tier but in 2017 they returned to the Ekstraliga. They won bronze medals in 2019 and 2022.

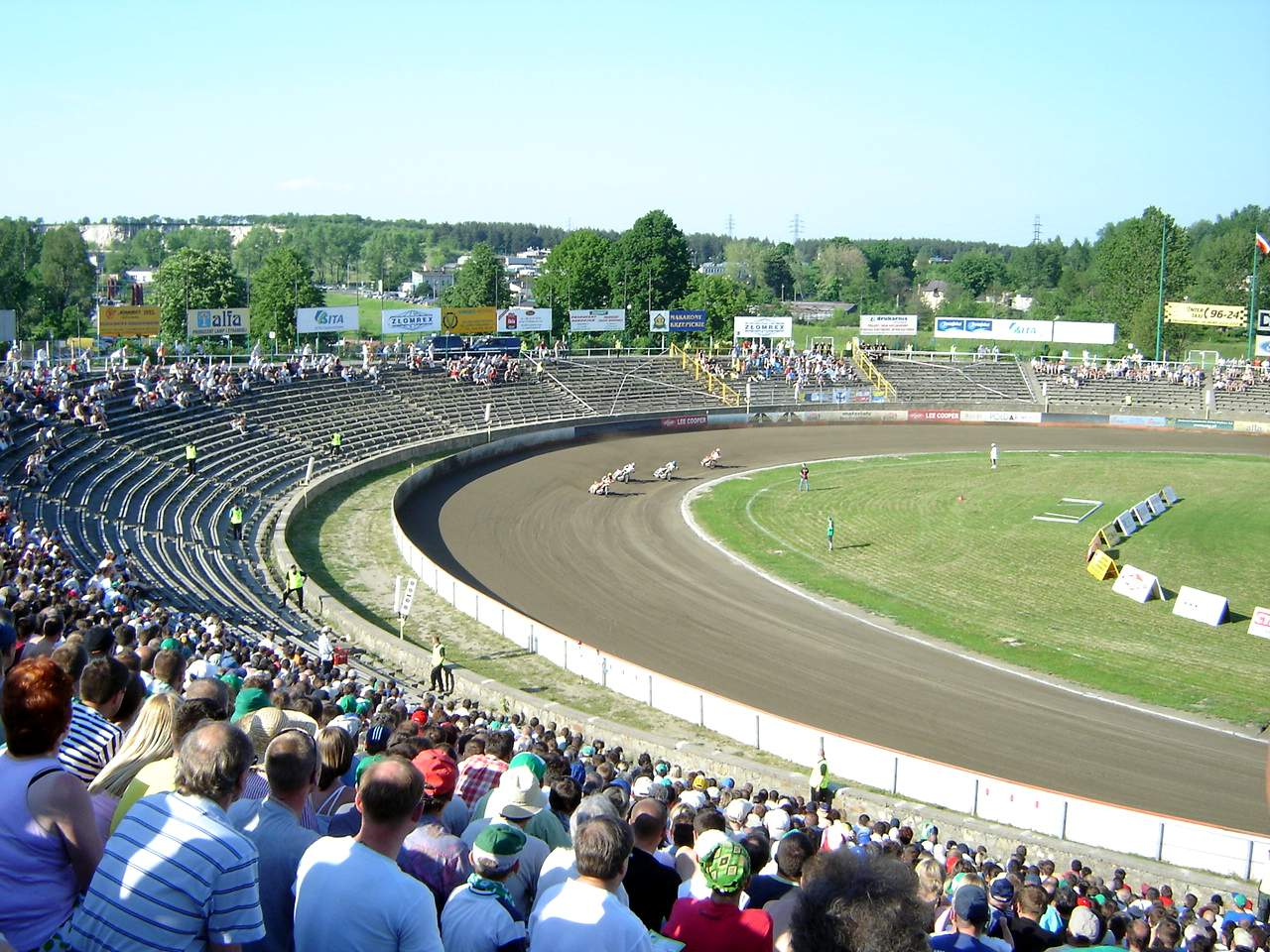
2005 Włókniarz match

== Previous teams ==
Extended content

2022 team

- (Denmark) Leon Madsen
- (Denmark) Jonas Jeppesen
- (Sweden) Fredrik Lindgren
- (Poland) Bartosz Smektała
- (Poland) Kacper Woryna
- (Poland) Mateusz Świdnicki
- (Poland) Jakub Miśkowiak
- (Poland) Kajetan Kupiec

2023 team

- (Denmark) Leon Madsen
- (Poland) Kacper Woryna
- (Poland) Jakub Miśkowiak
- (Poland) Kajetan Kupiec

== Notable riders ==
- (Poland) Marek Cieślak
- (Poland) Sławomir Drabik
- (Norway) Rune Holta
- (Sweden) Andreas Jonsson
- (Poland) Andrzej Jurczyński
- (Poland) Stefan Kwoczała
- (Denmark) Leon Madsen
- (England) Joe Screen
- (Australia) Ryan Sullivan
- (Poland) Sebastian Ułamek
- (Poland) Grzegorz Walasek

== Honours ==
Competitions	Total	Golden medals		Silver medals		Bronze medals
Competitions	Total	Total	Years	Total	Years	Total	Years
Team (DMP) (since 1948)	13	4	1959, 1974, 1996, 2003	3	1975, 1976, 2006	6	1977, 1978, 2004, 2005, 2009, 2019
Team U-21 (MDMP) (since 1978)	9	4	1996, 2000, 2017, 2021	3	2003, 2019, 2020	2	2008, 2016
Pairs (MPPK) (since 1974)	8	1	2006	1	1977	6	1976, 2000, 2001, 2002, 2018, 2021
Pairs U-21 (MMPPK) (1980 U-23; since 1983)	8	1	2013	4	1995, 2003, 2020, 2021	3	1996, 2016, 2019
Individual (IMP) (since 1948)	10	5	1959, 1991, 1996, 2003, 2004	2	1975, 1997	3	1960, 2004, 2006
Individual U-21 (MIMP) (since 1967)	4	1	2019	0		3	1973, 1986, 2003
Total Polish Championship medals: 52		Gold: 16		Silver: 13		Bronze: 23
Competitions	Total	I place		II place		III place
Competitions	Total	Total	Years	Total	Years	Total	Years
European Club (KPE) (since 1998)	1	1	2004	0		0
Team Cup (DPP) (?)	1	1	1994	0		0
Golden Helmet (ZK) (since 1961)	8	2	1976, 1991	2	2006, 2012	4	1972, 1997, 2004, 2014
Silver Helmet U-21 (SK) (since 1966)	4	0		4	1966, 1969, 1995, 2019	0
Bronze Helmet U-19 (BK) (1976-81; since 1983)	5	3	1979, 2006, 2019	0		2	1984, 2001
