= Stal Rzeszów (motorcycle speedway) =

Polish sporting venue

Club information
- Track address: Stadion Miejski w Rzeszowie
- Country: Poland
- Founded: 1944; 81 years ago (sports club); 1951; 74 years ago (motorcycle speedway section)
- Team manager: Paweł Piskorz
- League: Ekstraliga 2
- Website: Official website

Club facts
- Colours: Blue & White
- Track size: 395m
- Track record time: 64.54
- Track record date: 30 April 2023
- Track record holder: Jacob Thorssell

Major team honours
Team Championship	1960, 1961
silver medal	1962, 1963
bronze medal	1966, 1998
Pairs Championship	2005

Stal Rzeszów is a Polish motorcycle speedway club. The team currently competes in the Polish Speedway Second League (2. Liga) and have won the Team Speedway Polish Championship twice.

== History ==
=== 1948 to 1959 ===
The first speedway in Rzeszów was held at the Resovia stadium in 1948. The club made their league debut during the 1949 Polish speedway season under the name RTKM-Gwardia Rzeszów.

As Stal Rzeszów the team returned to league action in 1955 and in 1956, two clubs from Rzeszów competed in the league, with Resovia Rzeszów competing in addition to Stal.

Towards the end of the 1950s the team won the second division twice in 1957 and 1959. The 1959 success was a precursor of things to come.

=== 1960 to 1969 ===
The 1960s proved to be a golden period for the club, as Stal Rzeszów won the gold medal in the Team Speedway Polish Championship in 1960 and 1961. They also secured silver medals in 1962 and 1963. Florian Kapała was the star rider winning Polish Individual Speedway Championship in 1961 and 1962 and the Golden Helmet in 1962. A further medal was won in 1966, when the team won the bronze medal.

=== 1970 to 1999 ===
The 1970s and 1980s proved to be a low point because the success of the previous decade could not be reproduced. The team failed to win anything until 1981 and that was a second division title. Another barren spell ensued, until 1991 and another second division title success. The team had their best season for over 30 years, when they won a bronze medal during the 1998 Polish speedway season.

=== 2000 to present ===
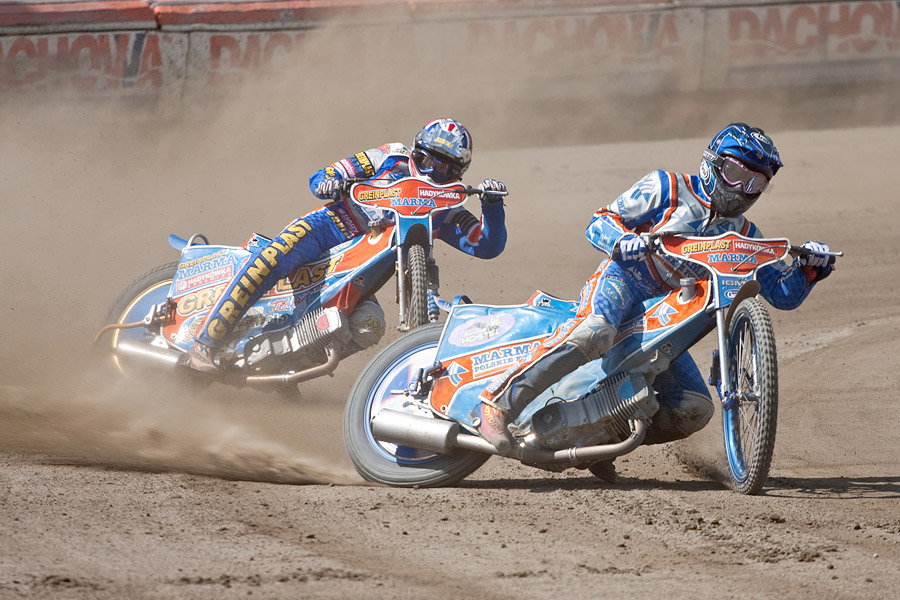
Stal Rzeszów in action during 2009

When the Ekstraliga was introduced in 2000, Rzeszów were in 1. Liga.

In 2005, the club provided a major shock when winning the Polish Pairs Speedway Championship as a second tier club, although they also won the second division too. The pairs success was achieved by Dariusz Śledz and Maciej Kuciapa.

In recent years the team has competed in the lower divisions winning 1. Liga in 2010 and 2014 and the 2. Liga in 2018.

== Previous teams ==
Extended content

2022 team'

- (Czech Republic) Eduard Krčmář
- (Germany) Kevin Wölbert
- (Poland) Dawid Lampart
- (Finland) Timi Salonen
- (Poland) Hubert Legowik
- (Poland) Paweł Miesiąc
- (Poland) Szymon Bandur

2023 team

- (Sweden) Jacob Thorssell
- (Denmark) Peter Kildemand
- (Denmark) Jonas Jeppesen
- (Poland) Marcin Nowak
- (Czech Republic) Eduard Krčmář
- (Germany) Kevin Wölbert
- (Poland) Mateusz Tudzieź
- (Poland) Rafał Karczmarz
- (Slovenia) Anže Grmek
- (Sweden) Philip Hellström Bängs
- (England) Anders Rowe
- (Poland) Mateusz Majcher

== Notable riders ==
- (Poland) Florian Kapała
- (Poland) Jan Krzystyniak
- (Poland) Maciej Kuciapa
- (Poland) Jan Malinowski
- (Poland) Dariusz Śledź

== Honours ==
Polish Championship Competition	Gold medals		Silver medals		Bronze medals
Polish Championship Competition	Total	Years	Total	Years	Total	Years
Team Championship	2	1960, 1961	2	1962, 1963	2	1966, 1998
Team Junior Championship	3	1994, 1995, 2006	1	1996	2	1989, 2007
National Individual Championship	2	1961, 1962	3	1959, 1989, 2012	2	1959, 1986
Individual Championship	0		2	1970, 1997	1	2009
Pairs Championship	1	2005	3	1989, 1990, 2010	0
Junior Pairs Championship	1	2006	1	1993	2	1997, 2008
Total medals: 30	Gold: 9		Silver: 12		Bronze: 9
Other National Competitions	Gold medals		Silver medals		Bronze medals
Other National Competitions	Total	Years	Total	Years	Total	Years
Golden Helmet Tournament	1	1961	3	1962, 2007, 2015	3	1989, 1993, 1998
Silver Helmet Tournament	1	1971	1	2005	2	1993, 2002
Bronze Helmet Championship	0		1	1989	0
Individual Polish Cup	0		0		1	1986
PZM Speedway Cup	0		2	1963, 1964	1	1965
Team Junior League Championship	0		1	2008	1	2015
Individual International Ekstraliga Championship	0		0		1	2015
Total medals: 19	Gold: 2		Silver: 8		Bronze: 9
World and European Championships	Gold		Silver		Bronze
World and European Championships	Total	Years	Total	Years	Total	Years
World Cup Team Championship	1	1961	0		1	1962
Junior World Team Championship	2	2006, 2009	0		0
Junior European Team Championship	3	2009, 2012, 2015	0		0
European Pairs Championship	1	2015	0		0
Total medals: 8	Gold: 7		Silver: 0		Bronze: 1
