= 2010 Speedway Grand Prix of Nordic =

(Denmark) 2010 Speedway Grand Prix of Nordic
- 2010 FIM Dansk Metal Nordic Speedway Grand Prix

Information
- Date: 11 September 2010
- City: (Denmark) Vojens
- Event: 9 of 11 (131)
- Jury President: (Finland) Ilkka Teromaa

Stadium details
- Stadium: Vojens Speedway Center
- Capacity: 22,000
- Length: 300 m (330 yd)

SGP Results
- Best Time
- (gold) Winner: (Poland) Tomasz Gollob
- (silver) Runner-up: (Denmark) Kenneth Bjerre
- (bronze) 3rd place: (Australia) Jason Crump

The 2010 FIM Dansk Metal Nordic Speedway Grand Prix was the ninth race of the 2010 Speedway Grand Prix season. It took place on 11 September at the Vojens Speedway Center in Vojens, Denmark.

The Nordic Grand Prix was won by Championship leader Pole Tomasz Gollob who scoring maximum 24 points and he beat Dane Kenneth Bjere, World Champion Australian Jason Crump and Dane Nicki Pedersen in the Final.

== Riders ==
The Speedway Grand Prix Commission nominated Niels Kristian Iversen as Wild Card, and Nicolai Klindt and Patrick Hougaard both as Track Reserves. Injured Emil Sayfutdinov will be replaced by second Qualified Substitutes rider Davey Watt. The Draw was made on September 10 by the FIM Jury President Ilkka Teromaa.

(3) (Russia) Emil Sayfutdinov → (20) (Australia) Davey Watt

== Heat details ==
Placing	Draw	Rider	Total	1	2	3	4	5	6	7	8	9	10	11	12	13	14	15	16	17	18	19	20	Pts	Pos	21	22	23
1	9	(Poland) (2) Tomasz Gollob	24			3		3						3					3		3			15	1	3		3
2	16	(Denmark) (8) Kenneth Bjerre	17				2				2	2						2			2			10	5		3	2
3	5	(Australia) (1) Jason Crump	15		1			2					3					3					2	11	2		2	1
4	10	(Denmark) (6) Nicki Pedersen	12			2			2						3			0		3				10	4	2		0
5	3	(Poland) (13) Jarosław Hampel	11	2						3				2				1				3		11	3		R3
6	8	(Australia) (12) Chris Holder	10		3						3			0			1			2				9	6	1
7	7	(Sweden) (5) Andreas Jonsson	9		2					2					2	1					1			8	8		1
8	11	(Sweden) (11) Magnus Zetterström	8			1				1		3					3						0	8	7	0
9	2	(Denmark) (10) Hans N. Andersen	7	0					3				2				2				0			7	9
10	15	(Denmark) (16) Niels Kristian Iversen	6				3			0			1						2	0				6	10
11	14	(Poland) (7) Rune Holta	6				X		0					1		2							3	6	11
12	4	(United States) (4) Greg Hancock	6	3							1				0				1				1	6	12
13	12	(Sweden) (9) Fredrik Lindgren	5			Fx					0		0			3						2		5	13
14	1	(United Kingdom) (14) Chris Harris	4	1				1				1				0				1				4	14
15	13	(United Kingdom) (15) Tai Woffinden	2				1	0							1		0					Rx		2	15
16	6	(Australia) (20) Davey Watt	1		0				1			0							0			Fx		1	16
17	17	(Denmark) (17) Nicolai Klindt	-																					-	17
18	18	(Denmark) (18) Patrick Hougaard	-																					-	18
Placing	Draw	Rider	Total	1	2	3	4	5	6	7	8	9	10	11	12	13	14	15	16	17	18	19	20	Pts	Pos	21	22	23

e: retired or mechanical failure • m: exclusion for exceeding two minute time allowance • t: exclusion for touching the tapes • x: other exclusion • f: fell
ns: non-starter • nc: non-classify
Semi-finals: Heat 21: Riders placed 1st, 4th, 6th & 7th in the intermediate classification (after 20 heats)
Heat 22: Riders placed 2nd, 3rd, 5th & 8th in the intermediate classification (after 20 heats)
Big Final (heat 23): The first and second placed riders in each of the Semi-Finals

gate A – inside	gate B	gate C	gate D – outside

=== Heat after heat ===
1. Hancock, Hampel, Harris, Andersen
2. Holder, Jonsson, Crump, Watt
3. Gollob, Pedersen, Zetterström, Lindgren (Fxu)
4. Iversen, Bjerre, Woffinden, Holta (X)
5. Gollob, Crump, Harris, Woffinden
6. Andersen, Pedersen, Watt, Holta
7. Hampel, Jonsson, ZetterströmIversen
8. Holder, Bjerre, Hancock, Lindgren
9. Zetterström, Bjerre, Harris, Watt
10. Crump, Andersen, Iversen, Lindgren
11. Gollob, Hampel, Holta, Holder
12. Pedersen, Jonsson, Woffinden, Hancock
13. Lindgren, Holta, Jonsson, Harris
14. Zetterström, Andersen, Holder, Woffinden
15. Crump, Bjerre, Hampel, Pedersen
16. Gollob, Iversen, Hancock, Watt
17. Pedersen, Holder, Harris, Iversen
18. Gollob, Bjerre, Jonsson, Andersen
19. Hampel, Lindgren, Watt (Fx) Woffinden (Rx)
20. Holta, Crump, Hancock, Zetterström
  Semi-Finals
21. Gollob, Pedersen, Holder, Zetterström
22. Bjerre, Crump, Jonsson, Hampel (R3)
  The Final
23. Gollob, Bjerre, Crump, Pedersen

== The intermediate classification ==
Qualifies for next season's Grand Prix series
Full-time Grand Prix rider
Wild card, track reserve or qualified reserve

Pos.	Rider	Points	EUR (Poland)	SWE (Sweden)	CZE (Czech Republic)	DEN (Denmark)	POL (Poland)	GBR (United Kingdom)	SCA (Sweden)	CRO (Croatia)	NOR (Denmark)	ITA (Italy)	PL2 (Poland)
1	(Poland) (2) Tomasz Gollob	141	6	16	17	15	24	12	17	10	24		
2	(Australia) (1) Jason Crump	122	19	7	7	10	15	17	15	17	15		
3	(Poland) (13) Jarosław Hampel	121	18	6	16	20	15	17	10	8	11		
4	(Denmark) (8) Kenneth Bjerre	98	10	20	12	13	4	7	9	6	17		
5	(Poland) (7) Rune Holta	88	10	6	7	6	19	8	20	6	6		
6	(Australia) (12) Chris Holder	83	8	11	7	9	6	19	6	7	10		
7	(United States) (4) Greg Hancock	81	4	14	7	3	6	7	12	22	6		
8	(United Kingdom) (14) Chris Harris	76	8	6	4	13	5	6	9	21	4		
9	(Denmark) (10) Hans N. Andersen	71	8	7	9	13	9	10	5	3	7		
10	(Sweden) (5) Andreas Jonsson	70	5	12	13	13	3	2	7	6	9		
11	(Sweden) (9) Fredrik Lindgren	70	8	4	7	8	6	10	11	11	5		
12	(Denmark) (6) Nicki Pedersen	67	9	8	14	5	8	7	0	4	12		
13	(Sweden) (11) Magnus Zetterström	60	4	9	11	7	6	6	3	6	8		
14	(United Kingdom) (15) Tai Woffinden	39	1	4	5	5	7	6	3	6	2		
15	(Russia) (3) Emil Sayfutdinov	33	14	8	5	–	–	–	6	–	–		
16	(Australia) (20) Davey Watt	13	–	–	–	–	–	6	–	6	1		
17	(Poland) (16) Janusz Kołodziej	12	12	–	–	–	–	–	–	–	–		
18	(Sweden) (16) Thomas H. Jonasson	8	–	–	–	–	–	–	8	–	–		
19	(Sweden) (16) Antonio Lindbäck	6	–	6	–	–	–	–	–	–	–		
20	(Poland) (16) Adrian Miedziński	6	–	–	–	–	6	–	–	–	–		
21	(Denmark) (16) Niels Kristian Iversen	6	–	–	–	–	–	–	–	–	6		
22	(Croatia) (16) Jurica Pavlic	5	–	–	–	–	–	–	–	5	–		
23	(Poland) (19) Piotr Protasiewicz	5	–	–	–	0	5	–	–	–	–		
24	(United Kingdom) (16) Scott Nicholls	4	–	–	–	–	–	4	–	–	–		
25	(Czech Republic) (16) Matěj Kůs	3	–	–	3	–	–	–	–	–	–		
26	(Denmark) (16) Leon Madsen	3	–	–	–	3	–	–	–	–	–		
27	(Sweden) (18) Ludvig Lindgren	2	–	–	–	–	–	–	2	–	–		
28	(Denmark) (17) Nicolai Klindt	1	–	–	–	1	–	–	–	–	ns		
29	(Sweden) (17) Linus Sundström	1	–	–	–	–	–	–	1	–	–		
30	(Czech Republic) (17) Luboš Tomíček, Jr.	0	–	–	0	–	–	–	–	–	–		
31	(Poland) (17) Artur Mroczka	0	–	–	–	–	0	–	–	–	–		
32	(Slovenia) (17) Matija Duh	0	–	–	–	–	–	–	–	0	–		
33	(Czech Republic) (18) Zdeněk Simota	0	–	–	0	–	–	–	–	–	–		
Rider(s) not classified
	(Poland) (17) Damian Baliński	—	ns	–	–	–	–	–	–	–	–		
	(Sweden) (17) Simon Gustafsson	—	–	ns	–	–	–	–	–	–	–		
	(United Kingdom) (17) Ben Barker	—	–	–	–	–	–	ns	–	–	–		
	(Poland) (18) Maciej Janowski	—	ns	–	–	–	ns	–	–	–	–		
	(Sweden) (18) Dennis Andersson	—	–	ns	–	–	–	–	–	–	–		
	(Denmark) (18) Patrick Hougaard	—	–	–	–	ns	–	–	–	–	ns		
	(United Kingdom) (18) Daniel King	—	–	–	–	–	–	ns	–	–	–		
	(Hungary) (18) József Tabaka	—	–	–	–	–	–	–	–	ns	–		
Pos.	Rider	Points	EUR (Poland)	SWE (Sweden)	CZE (Czech Republic)	DEN (Denmark)	POL (Poland)	GBR (United Kingdom)	SCA (Sweden)	CRO (Croatia)	NOR (Denmark)	ITA (Italy)	PL2 (Poland)

== See also ==
- Motorcycle speedway
