= 2010 Speedway Grand Prix of Italy =

- 2010 FIM Nice Italian Speedway Grand Prix

Information
- Date: 25 September 2010
- City: (Italy) Terenzano
- Event: 10 of 11 (132)
- Referee: (Poland) Wojciech Grodzki
- Jury President: (Germany) Wolfgang Glas

Stadium details
- Stadium: Pista Olimpia Terenzano
- Length: 400 m (440 yd)

SGP Results
- Best Time
- (gold) Winner: (Poland) Tomasz Gollob
- (silver) Runner-up: (United Kingdom) Chris Harris
- (bronze) 3rd place: (United States) Greg Hancock

The 2010 FIM Nice Italian Speedway Grand Prix was the ninth race of the 2010 Speedway Grand Prix season. It took place on 11 September at the Pista Olimpia Terenzano in Terenzano, Italy.

The Italian Grand Prix was won by World Championship leader Tomasz Gollob, who become 2010 World Champion. Gollob won last year SGP also. Tomasz Gollob beat Chris Harris, Greg Hancock and Nicki Pedersen in the final heat.

== Riders ==
The Speedway Grand Prix Commission nominated Mattia Carpanese as Wild Card, and Mattia Cavicchioli and Andrea Maida both as Track Reserves. Injured Emil Sayfutdinov will be replaced by second Qualified Substitutes rider Davey Watt. The Draw was made on September 24 by Nicola Turello, Mayor of Pozzuolo del Friuli.

(3) (Russia) Emil Sayfutdinov → (20) (Australia) Davey Watt

== Heat details ==
Placing	Draw	Rider	Total	1	2	3	4	5	6	7	8	9	10	11	12	13	14	15	16	17	18	19	20	Pts	Pos	21	22	23
1	16	(Poland) (2) Tomasz Gollob	22				1				3	3						3			3			13	1	3		3
2	7	(United Kingdom) (14) Chris Harris	18		3					2					3	3					1			12	2		2	2
3	13	(United States) (4) Greg Hancock	14				3	3							2		F2x					1		9	3		3	1
4	1	(Denmark) (6) Nicki Pedersen	11	3				1				1				1				3				9	4	2		0
5	6	(Poland) (13) Jarosław Hampel	10		2				1			2							1			3		9	5		1
6	14	(Poland) (7) Rune Holta	9				0		3					R4		2							3	8	6	1
7	3	(Sweden) (5) Andreas Jonsson	8	0						1				3				2				2		8	7	0
8	2	(Denmark) (10) Hans N. Andersen	8	1					X				2				3				2			8	8		0
9	11	(Australia) (1) Jason Crump	7			0				3		R					2						2	7	9
10	15	(Australia) (12) Chris Holder	7				2			0			F3x						3	2				7	10
11	9	(Sweden) (11) Magnus Zetterström	7			2		2						1					2		0			7	11
12	10	(Australia) (20) Davey Watt	6			3			2						0			1		0				6	12
13	12	(Sweden) (9) Fredrik Lindgren	6			1					2		3			0						0		6	13
14	8	(United Kingdom) (15) Tai Woffinden	6		1						1			2			1			1				6	14
15	4	(Denmark) (8) Kenneth Bjerre	4	2							0				1				0				1	4	15
16	5	(Italy) (16) Mattia Carpanese	1		F4			0					1					0					0	1	16
17	17	(Italy) (17) Mattia Cavicchioli	-																					-	17
18	18	(Italy) (18) Andrea Maida	-																					-	18
Placing	Draw	Rider	Total	1	2	3	4	5	6	7	8	9	10	11	12	13	14	15	16	17	18	19	20	Pts	Pos	21	22	23

e: retired or mechanical failure • m: exclusion for exceeding two minute time allowance • t: exclusion for touching the tapes • x: other exclusion • f: fell
ns: non-starter • nc: non-classify
Semi-finals: Heat 21: Riders placed 1st, 4th, 6th & 7th in the intermediate classification (after 20 heats)
Heat 22: Riders placed 2nd, 3rd, 5th & 8th in the intermediate classification (after 20 heats)
Big Final (heat 23): The first and second placed riders in each of the Semi-Finals

gate A – inside	gate B	gate C	gate D – outside

=== Heat after heat ===
1. Pedersen, Bjerre, Andersen, Jonsson
2. Harris, Hampel, Woffinden, Carpanese (F4)
3. Watt, Zetterström, Lindgren, Crump
4. Hancock, Holder, Gollob, Holta
5. Hancock, Zetterström, Pedersen, Carpanese
6. Holta, Watt, Hampel, Andersen (X)
7. Crump, Harris, Jonsson, Holder
8. Gollob, Lindgren, Woffinden, Bjerre
9. Gollob, Hampel, Pedersen, Crump (R/start)
10. Lindgren, Andersen, Carpanese, Holder (F3x)
11. Jonsson, Woffinden, Zetterström, Holta (R4)
12. Harris, Hancock, Bjerre, Watt
13. Harris, Holta, Pedersen, Lindgren
14. Andersen, Crump, Woffinden, Hancock (F2x)
15. Gollob, Jonsson, Watt, Carpanese
16. Holder, Zetterström, Hampel, Bjerre
17. Pedersen, Holder, Woffinden, Watt
18. Gollob, Andersen, Harris, Zetterström
19. Hampel, Jonsson, Hancock, Lindgren
20. Holta, Crump, Bjerre, Carpanese
  Semi-Finals:
21. Gollob, Pedersen, Holta, Jonsson
22. Hancock, Harris, Hampel, Andersen
  The Final:
23. Gollob (6 pts), Harris (4 pts), Hancock (2 pts), Pedersen (0 pts)

== The intermediate classification ==
Qualifies for next season's Grand Prix series
Full-time Grand Prix rider
Wild card, track reserve or qualified reserve

Pos.	Rider	Points	EUR (Poland)	SWE (Sweden)	CZE (Czech Republic)	DEN (Denmark)	POL (Poland)	GBR (United Kingdom)	SCA (Sweden)	CRO (Croatia)	NOR (Denmark)	ITA (Italy)	PL2 (Poland)
Gold	(Poland) (2) Tomasz Gollob	163	6	16	17	15	24	12	17	10	24	22	
2	(Poland) (13) Jarosław Hampel	131	18	6	16	20	15	17	10	8	11	10	
3	(Australia) (1) Jason Crump	129	19	7	7	10	15	17	15	17	15	7	
4	(Denmark) (8) Kenneth Bjerre	102	10	20	12	13	4	7	9	6	17	4	
5	(Poland) (7) Rune Holta	97	10	6	7	6	19	8	20	6	6	9	
6	(United States) (4) Greg Hancock	95	4	14	7	3	6	7	12	22	6	14	
7	(United Kingdom) (14) Chris Harris	94	8	6	4	13	5	6	9	21	4	18	
8	(Australia) (12) Chris Holder	90	8	11	7	9	6	19	6	7	10	7	
9	(Denmark) (10) Hans N. Andersen	79	8	7	9	13	9	10	5	3	7	8	
10	(Sweden) (5) Andreas Jonsson	78	5	12	13	13	3	2	7	6	9	8	
11	(Denmark) (6) Nicki Pedersen	78	9	8	14	5	8	7	0	4	12	11	
12	(Sweden) (9) Fredrik Lindgren	76	8	4	7	8	6	10	11	11	5	6	
13	(Sweden) (11) Magnus Zetterström	67	4	9	11	7	6	6	3	6	8	7	
14	(United Kingdom) (15) Tai Woffinden	45	1	4	5	5	7	6	3	6	2	6	
15	(Russia) (3) Emil Sayfutdinov	33	14	8	5	–	–	–	6	–	–	–	
16	(Australia) (20) Davey Watt	19	–	–	–	–	–	6	–	6	1	6	
17	(Poland) (16) Janusz Kołodziej	12	12	–	–	–	–	–	–	–	–	–	
18	(Sweden) (16) Thomas H. Jonasson	8	–	–	–	–	–	–	8	–	–	–	
19	(Sweden) (16) Antonio Lindbäck	6	–	6	–	–	–	–	–	–	–	–	
20	(Poland) (16) Adrian Miedziński	6	–	–	–	–	6	–	–	–	–	–	
21	(Denmark) (16) Niels Kristian Iversen	6	–	–	–	–	–	–	–	–	6	–	
22	(Croatia) (16) Jurica Pavlic	5	–	–	–	–	–	–	–	5	–	–	
23	(Poland) (19) Piotr Protasiewicz	5	–	–	–	0	5	–	–	–	–	–	
24	(United Kingdom) (16) Scott Nicholls	4	–	–	–	–	–	4	–	–	–	–	
25	(Czech Republic) (16) Matěj Kůs	3	–	–	3	–	–	–	–	–	–	–	
26	(Denmark) (16) Leon Madsen	3	–	–	–	3	–	–	–	–	–	–	
27	(Sweden) (18) Ludvig Lindgren	2	–	–	–	–	–	–	2	–	–	–	
28	(Italy) (16) Mattia Carpanese	1	–	–	–	–	–	–	–	–	–	1	
29	(Denmark) (17) Nicolai Klindt	1	–	–	–	1	–	–	–	–	ns	–	
30	(Sweden) (17) Linus Sundström	1	–	–	–	–	–	–	1	–	–	–	
31	(Czech Republic) (17) Luboš Tomíček, Jr.	0	–	–	0	–	–	–	–	–	–	–	
32	(Poland) (17) Artur Mroczka	0	–	–	–	–	0	–	–	–	–	–	
33	(Slovenia) (17) Matija Duh	0	–	–	–	–	–	–	–	0	–	–	
34	(Czech Republic) (18) Zdeněk Simota	0	–	–	0	–	–	–	–	–	–	–	
Rider(s) not classified
	(Poland) (17) Damian Baliński	—	ns	–	–	–	–	–	–	–	–	–	
	(Sweden) (17) Simon Gustafsson	—	–	ns	–	–	–	–	–	–	–	–	
	(United Kingdom) (17) Ben Barker	—	–	–	–	–	–	ns	–	–	–	–	
	(Italy) (17) Mattia Cavicchioli	—	–	–	–	–	–	–	–	–	–	ns	
	(Poland) (18) Maciej Janowski	—	ns	–	–	–	ns	–	–	–	–	–	
	(Sweden) (18) Dennis Andersson	—	–	ns	–	–	–	–	–	–	–	–	
	(Denmark) (18) Patrick Hougaard	—	–	–	–	ns	–	–	–	–	ns	–	
	(United Kingdom) (18) Daniel King	—	–	–	–	–	–	ns	–	–	–	–	
	(Hungary) (18) József Tabaka	—	–	–	–	–	–	–	–	ns	–	–	
	(Italy) (18) Andrea Maida	—	–	–	–	–	–	–	–	–	–	ns	
Pos.	Rider	Points	EUR (Poland)	SWE (Sweden)	CZE (Czech Republic)	DEN (Denmark)	POL (Poland)	GBR (United Kingdom)	SCA (Sweden)	CRO (Croatia)	NOR (Denmark)	ITA (Italy)	PL2 (Poland)

== See also ==
- Motorcycle speedway
