= 2010 Speedway Grand Prix of Poland II =

Racing event

- 2010 FIM Bydgoszcz Speedway Grand Prix of Poland

Information
- Date: 9 October 2010
- City: (Poland) Bydgoszcz
- Event: 11 of 11 (133)
- Referee: (United Kingdom) Tony Steele
- Jury President: (Sweden) Christer Bergstrom

Stadium details
- Stadium: Polonia Stadium
- Length: 348 m (381 yd)

SGP Results
- Best Time: (Sweden) Andreas Jonsson; 63.84 secs (in Heat 23)
- (gold) Winner: (Sweden) Andreas Jonsson
- (silver) Runner-up: (United Kingdom) Chris Harris
- (bronze) 3rd place: (Poland) Janusz Kolodziej

The 2010 FIM Bydgoszcz Speedway Grand Prix of Poland was the eleventh and final race of the 2010 Speedway Grand Prix season. It took place on October 9 at the Polonia Stadium in Bydgoszcz, Poland.

The Bydgoszcz Grand Prix was won by Polonia' rider Andreas Jonsson who beat Chris Harris, wild card Janusz Kołodziej and Rune Holta in the Final.

There was a second time, when two Grand Prix event in Poland was named of Poland after 1999' Wrocław and Bydgoszcz meetings.

== Riders ==
The Speedway Grand Prix Commission nominated Janusz Kołodziej as Wild Card, and Przemysław Pawlicki and Artur Mroczka both as Track Reserves. Injured Emil Sayfutdinov will be replaced by first Qualified Substitutes rider Piotr Protasiewicz. The Draw was made on September 24 at 13:00 CEST by Deputy President of Bydgoszcz Maciej Grześkowiak.

(3) (Russia) Emil Sayfutdinov → (19) (Poland) Piotr Protasiewicz

== Heat details ==
Placing	Draw	Rider	Total	1	2	3	4	5	6	7	8	9	10	11	12	13	14	15	16	17	18	19	20	Pts	Pos	21	22	23
1	3	(Sweden) (5) Andreas Jonsson	17	0						3				1				3				2		9	4	2		3
2	6	(United Kingdom) (14) Chris Harris	13		0				3			1							0			3		7	8		2	2
3	2	(Poland) (16) Janusz Kołodziej	14	1					2				3				2				1			9	6	3		1
4	1	(Poland) (7) Rune Holta	12	2				1				2				3				1				9	5		3	0
5	16	(Denmark) (6) Nicki Pedersen	13				2				3	3						2			2			12	1	1
6	13	(United States) (4) Greg Hancock	12				3	2							2		3					1		11	3		1
7	7	(Sweden) (9) Fredrik Lindgren	11		2					2					3	1					3			11	2		0
8	9	(Poland) (19) Piotr Protasiewicz	8			0		3						3					2		0			8	7	0
9	12	(Sweden) (11) Magnus Zetterström	7			3					2		2			0						0		7	9
10	8	(Denmark) (10) Hans N. Andersen	7		1						1			2			0			3				7	10
11	11	(Australia) (1) Jason Crump	6			1				1		0					1						3	6	11
12	14	(Australia) (12) Chris Holder	6				1		1					0		2							2	6	12
13	10	(Poland) (13) Jarosław Hampel	6			2			0						1			1		2				6	13
14	15	(United Kingdom) (15) Tai Woffinden	4				0			0			1						3	0				4	14
15	4	(Denmark) (8) Kenneth Bjerre	4	3							0				0				1				R	4	15
16	5	(Poland) (2) Tomasz Gollob	3		3			R					R					-					-	3	16
17	18	(Poland) (18) Artur Mroczka	1																				1	1	17
18	17	(Poland) (17) Przemysław Pawlicki	0															0						0	18
Placing	Draw	Rider	Total	1	2	3	4	5	6	7	8	9	10	11	12	13	14	15	16	17	18	19	20	Pts	Pos	21	22	23

e: retired or mechanical failure • m: exclusion for exceeding two minute time allowance • t: exclusion for touching the tapes • x: other exclusion • f: fell
ns: non-starter • nc: non-classify
Semi-finals: Heat 21: Riders placed 1st, 4th, 6th & 7th in the intermediate classification (after 20 heats)
Heat 22: Riders placed 2nd, 3rd, 5th & 8th in the intermediate classification (after 20 heats)
Big Final (heat 23): The first and second placed riders in each of the Semi-Finals

gate A – inside	gate B	gate C	gate D – outside

=== Heat after heat ===
1. (64.57) Bjerre, Holta, Kołodziej, Jonsson
2. (64.62) Gollob, Lindgren, Andersen, Harris
3. (64.44) Zetterstroem, Hampel, Crump, Protasiewicz
4. (64.60) Hancock, Pedersen, Holder, Woffinden
5. (65.96) Protasiewicz, Hancock, Holta, Gollob (d)
6. (66.38) Harris, Kołodziej, Holder, Hampel
7. (65.98) Jonsson, Lindgren, Crump, Woffinden
8. (65.60) Pedersen, Zetterstroem, Andersen, Bjerre
9. (65.41) Pedersen, Holta, Harris, Crump
10. (64.58) Kołodziej, Zetterstroem, Woffinden, Gollob (d)
11. (65.01) Protasiewicz, Andersen, Jonsson, Holder
12. (65.07) Lindgren, Hancock, Hampel, Bjerre
13. (64.62) Holta, Holder, Lindgren, Zetterstroem
14. (64.55) Hancock, Kołodziej, Crump, Andersen
15. (64.29) Jonsson, Pedersen, Hampel, Pawlicki
16. (64.87) Woffinden, Protasiewicz, Bjerre, Harris
17. (65.09) Andersen, Hampel, Holta, Woffinden
18. (64.26) Lindgren, Pedersen, Kołodziej, Protasiewicz
19. (64.25) Harris, Jonsson, Hancock, Zetterstroem
20. (64.28) Crump, Holder, Mroczka, Bjerre (d)
  Semi-Finals:
21. (64.54) Kołodziej, Jonsson, Pedersen, Protasiewicz
22. (64.16) Holta, Harris, Hancock, Lindgren
  The Final:
23. (63.84) Jonsson, Harris, Kołodziej, Holta

== The intermediate classification ==
Qualifies for next season's Grand Prix series
Full-time Grand Prix rider
Wild card, track reserve or qualified reserve

Pos.	Rider	Points	EUR (Poland)	SWE (Sweden)	CZE (Czech Republic)	DEN (Denmark)	POL (Poland)	GBR (United Kingdom)	SCA (Sweden)	CRO (Croatia)	NOR (Denmark)	ITA (Italy)	PL2 (Poland)
Gold	(Poland) (2) Tomasz Gollob	166	6	16	17	15	24	12	17	10	24	22	3
Silver	(Poland) (13) Jarosław Hampel	137	18	6	16	20	15	17	10	8	11	10	6
Bronze	(Australia) (1) Jason Crump	135	19	7	7	10	15	17	15	17	15	7	6
4	(Poland) (7) Rune Holta	109	10	6	7	6	19	8	20	6	6	9	12
5	(United States) (4) Greg Hancock	107	4	14	7	3	6	7	12	22	6	14	12
6	(United Kingdom) (14) Chris Harris	107	8	6	4	13	5	6	9	21	4	18	13
7	(Denmark) (8) Kenneth Bjerre	106	10	20	12	13	4	7	9	6	17	4	4
8	(Australia) (12) Chris Holder	96	8	11	7	9	6	19	6	7	10	7	6
9	(Sweden) (5) Andreas Jonsson	95	5	12	13	13	3	2	7	6	9	8	17
10	(Denmark) (6) Nicki Pedersen	91	9	8	14	5	8	7	0	4	12	11	13
11	(Sweden) (9) Fredrik Lindgren	87	8	4	7	8	6	10	11	11	5	6	11
12	(Denmark) (10) Hans N. Andersen	86	8	7	9	13	9	10	5	3	7	8	7
13	(Sweden) (11) Magnus Zetterström	74	4	9	11	7	6	6	3	6	8	7	7
14	(United Kingdom) (15) Tai Woffinden	49	1	4	5	5	7	6	3	6	2	6	4
15	(Russia) (3) Emil Sayfutdinov	33	14	8	5	–	–	–	6	–	–	–	–
16	(Poland) (16) Janusz Kołodziej	26	12	–	–	–	–	–	–	–	–	–	14
17	(Australia) (20) Davey Watt	19	–	–	–	–	–	6	–	6	1	6	–
18	(Poland) (19) Piotr Protasiewicz	13	–	–	–	0	5	–	–	–	–	–	8
19	(Sweden) (16) Thomas H. Jonasson	8	–	–	–	–	–	–	8	–	–	–	–
20	(Sweden) (16) Antonio Lindbäck	6	–	6	–	–	–	–	–	–	–	–	–
21	(Poland) (16) Adrian Miedziński	6	–	–	–	–	6	–	–	–	–	–	–
22	(Denmark) (16) Niels Kristian Iversen	6	–	–	–	–	–	–	–	–	6	–	–
23	(Croatia) (16) Jurica Pavlic	5	–	–	–	–	–	–	–	5	–	–	–
24	(United Kingdom) (16) Scott Nicholls	4	–	–	–	–	–	4	–	–	–	–	–
25	(Czech Republic) (16) Matěj Kůs	3	–	–	3	–	–	–	–	–	–	–	–
26	(Denmark) (16) Leon Madsen	3	–	–	–	3	–	–	–	–	–	–	–
27	(Sweden) (18) Ludvig Lindgren	2	–	–	–	–	–	–	2	–	–	–	–
28	(Italy) (16) Mattia Carpanese	1	–	–	–	–	–	–	–	–	–	1	–
29	(Denmark) (17) Nicolai Klindt	1	–	–	–	1	–	–	–	–	ns	–	–
30	(Poland) (17)(18) Artur Mroczka	1	–	–	–	–	0	–	–	–	–	–	1
31	(Sweden) (17) Linus Sundström	1	–	–	–	–	–	–	1	–	–	–	–
32	(Czech Republic) (17) Luboš Tomíček, Jr.	0	–	–	0	–	–	–	–	–	–	–	–
33	(Slovenia) (17) Matija Duh	0	–	–	–	–	–	–	–	0	–	–	–
34	(Poland) (17) Przemysław Pawlicki	0	–	–	–	–	–	–	–	–	–	–	0
35	(Czech Republic) (18) Zdeněk Simota	0	–	–	0	–	–	–	–	–	–	–	–
Rider(s) not classified
	(Poland) (17) Damian Baliński	—	ns	–	–	–	–	–	–	–	–	–	–
	(Sweden) (17) Simon Gustafsson	—	–	ns	–	–	–	–	–	–	–	–	–
	(United Kingdom) (17) Ben Barker	—	–	–	–	–	–	ns	–	–	–	–	–
	(Italy) (17) Mattia Cavicchioli	—	–	–	–	–	–	–	–	–	–	ns	–
	(Poland) (18) Maciej Janowski	—	ns	–	–	–	ns	–	–	–	–	–	–
	(Sweden) (18) Dennis Andersson	—	–	ns	–	–	–	–	–	–	–	–	–
	(Denmark) (18) Patrick Hougaard	—	–	–	–	ns	–	–	–	–	ns	–	–
	(United Kingdom) (18) Daniel King	—	–	–	–	–	–	ns	–	–	–	–	–
	(Hungary) (18) József Tabaka	—	–	–	–	–	–	–	–	ns	–	–	–
	(Italy) (18) Andrea Maida	—	–	–	–	–	–	–	–	–	–	ns	–
Pos.	Rider	Points	EUR (Poland)	SWE (Sweden)	CZE (Czech Republic)	DEN (Denmark)	POL (Poland)	GBR (United Kingdom)	SCA (Sweden)	CRO (Croatia)	NOR (Denmark)	ITA (Italy)	PL2 (Poland)

== See also ==
- Motorcycle speedway
