= 2010 Speedway Grand Prix of Croatia =

- 2010 FIM Croatian Speedway Grand Prix

Information
- Date: 29 August 2010
- City: (Croatia) Donji Kraljevec (Goričan)
- Event: 8 of 11 (130)
- Referee: (Poland) Wojciech Grodzki
- Jury President: (Sweden) Christer Bergstrøm

Stadium details
- Stadium: Stadium Milenium
- Capacity: 8,000
- Length: 305 m (334 yd)

SGP Results
- Attendance: 6,000
- Best Time: (United Kingdom) Chris Harris; 59.54 secs (in Heat 12)
- (gold) Winner: (United States) Greg Hancock
- (silver) Runner-up: (United Kingdom) Chris Harris
- (bronze) 3rd place: (Australia) Jason Crump

The 2010 FIM Valvoline Croatian Speedway Grand Prix was the eighth race of the 2010 Speedway Grand Prix season. It took place on August 29 at the Stadium Milenium in Donji Kraljevec, Croatia.

Though scheduled to take place on August 28, the meeting was delayed as the track was deemed unsuitable by the FIM Jury due to adverse weather conditions. The event will be re-staged on the next day at 12 p.m. It was the second Grand Prix meeting which was re-staged at Sunday, after 1997 Speedway Grand Prix of Germany.

The first-ever Croatian Grand Prix was won by Greg Hancock from the United States, who beat British Chris Harris, World Champion Jason Crump and Fredrik Lindgren of Sweden in the Final. It was his eleventh Grand Prix winning. Hancock also won first-ever British (1995), Czech Republic (1997), Australian (2002) and Latvian (2006) Grands Prix. Croatian Grand Prix was 130th-ever Grand Prix meeting in history. Today winner, Greg Hancock is the only rider who started in all 130 events. It was first final in the 2010 season without any Pole.

== Riders ==
The Speedway Grand Prix Commission nominated Jurica Pavlic as Wild Card, and Matija Duh and József Tabaka both as Track Reserves. Injured Emil Sayfutdinov will be replaced by second Qualified Substitutes rider Davey Watt. The Draw was made on August 27 at 13:00 CEST by the Deputy-Mayor of Međimurje County.

(3) (Russia) Emil Sayfutdinov → (20) (Australia) Davey Watt

It was the SGP debut for Matija Duh of Slovenia. Duh replaced Holder in Heat 19 and finished 4th scoring 0 points.

== Heat details ==
Placing	Draw	Rider	Total	1	2	3	4	5	6	7	8	9	10	11	12	13	14	15	16	17	18	19	20	Pts	Pos	21	22	23
1	7	(United States) (4) Greg Hancock	22		2					3					2	3					3			13	2		3	3
2	10	(United Kingdom) (14) Chris Harris	21			3			2						3			3		3				14	1	3		2
3	14	(Australia) (1) Jason Crump	17				3		3					2		2							3	13	3		2	1
4	1	(Sweden) (9) Fredrik Lindgren	11	3				3				2				1				0				9	4	2		0
5	3	(Poland) (2) Tomasz Gollob	10	1						0				3				2				3		9	5		1
6	6	(Poland) (13) Jarosław Hampel	8		0				0			3							3			1		7	6	1
7	13	(Australia) (12) Chris Holder	7				2	1							1		3					M/-		7	7	0
8	5	(Poland) (7) Rune Holta	6		3			0					3					0					0	6	8		F4
9	16	(Denmark) (8) Kenneth Bjerre	6				0				3	0						1			2			6	9
10	4	(United Kingdom) (15) Tai Woffinden	6	0							2				0				2				2	6	10
11	15	(Australia) (20) Davey Watt	6				1			1			2						0	2				6	11
12	12	(Sweden) (5) Andreas Jonsson	6			2					1		1			X						2		6	12
13	9	(Sweden) (11) Magnus Zetterström	6			1		2						1					1		1			6	13
14	11	(Croatia) (16) Jurica Pavlic	5			0				2		1					1						1	5	14
15	8	(Denmark) (6) Nicki Pedersen	4		1						0			0			2			1				4	15
16	2	(Denmark) (10) Hans N. Andersen	3	2					1				0				0				0			3	16
17	17	(Slovenia) (17) Matija Duh	0																			0		0	17
18	18	(Hungary) (18) József Tabaka	-																					-	18
Placing	Draw	Rider	Total	1	2	3	4	5	6	7	8	9	10	11	12	13	14	15	16	17	18	19	20	Pts	Pos	21	22	23

e: retired or mechanical failure • m: exclusion for exceeding two minute time allowance • t: exclusion for touching the tapes • x: other exclusion • f: fell
ns: non-starter • nc: non-classify
Semi-finals: Heat 21: Riders placed 1st, 4th, 6th & 7th in the intermediate classification (after 20 heats)
Heat 22: Riders placed 2nd, 3rd, 5th & 8th in the intermediate classification (after 20 heats)
Big Final (heat 23): The first and second placed riders in each of the Semi-Finals

gate A – inside	gate B	gate C	gate D – outside

=== Heat after heat ===
1. Lindgren, Andersen, Gollob, Woffinden
2. Holta, Hancock, Pedersen, Hampel
3. Harris, Jonsson, Zetterstroem, Pavlic
4. Crump, Holder, Watt, Bjerre
5. Lindgren, Zetterstroem, Holder, Holta
6. Crump, Harris, Andersen, Hampel
7. Hancock, Pavlic, Watt, Gollob
8. Bjerre, Woffinden, Jonsson, Pedersen
9. Hampel, Lindgren, Pavlic, Bjerre
10. Holta, Watt, Jonsson, Andersen
11. Gollob, Crump, Zetterstroem, Pedersen
12. Harris, Hancock, Holder, Woffinden
13. Hancock, Crump, Lindgren, Jonsson (X)
14. Holder, Pedersen, Pavlic, Andersen
15. Harris, Gollob, Bjerre, Holta
16. Hampel, Woffinden, Zetterstroem, Watt
17. Harris, Watt, Pedersen, Lindgren
18. Hancock, Bjerre, Zetterstroem, Andersen
19. Gollob, Jonsson, Hampel, Duh (Holder - M)
20. Crump, Woffinden, Pavlic, Holta
  Semi-Finals:
21. Harris, Lindgren, Hampel, Holder
22. Hancock, Crump, Gollob, Holta (F4)
  The Final:
23. Hancock, Harris, Crump, Lindgren

== The intermediate classification ==
Qualifies for next season's Grand Prix series
Full-time Grand Prix rider
Wild card, track reserve or qualified reserve

Pos.	Rider	Points	EUR (Poland)	SWE (Sweden)	CZE (Czech Republic)	DEN (Denmark)	POL (Poland)	GBR (United Kingdom)	SCA (Sweden)	CRO (Croatia)	NOR (Denmark)	ITA (Italy)	PL2 (Poland)
1	(Poland) (2) Tomasz Gollob	117	6	16	17	15	24	12	17	10			
2	(Poland) (13) Jarosław Hampel	110	18	6	16	20	15	17	10	8			
3	(Australia) (1) Jason Crump	107	19	7	7	10	15	17	15	17			
4	(Poland) (7) Rune Holta	82	10	6	7	6	19	8	20	6			
5	(Denmark) (8) Kenneth Bjerre	81	10	20	12	13	4	7	9	6			
6	(United States) (4) Greg Hancock	75	4	14	7	3	6	7	12	22			
7	(Australia) (12) Chris Holder	73	8	11	7	9	6	19	6	7			
8	(United Kingdom) (14) Chris Harris	72	8	6	4	13	5	6	9	21			
9	(Sweden) (9) Fredrik Lindgren	65	8	4	7	8	6	10	11	11			
10	(Denmark) (10) Hans N. Andersen	64	8	7	9	13	9	10	5	3			
11	(Sweden) (5) Andreas Jonsson	61	5	12	13	13	3	2	7	6			
12	(Denmark) (6) Nicki Pedersen	55	9	8	14	5	8	7	0	4			
13	(Sweden) (11) Magnus Zetterström	52	4	9	11	7	6	6	3	6			
14	(United Kingdom) (15) Tai Woffinden	37	1	4	5	5	7	6	3	6			
15	(Russia) (3) Emil Sayfutdinov	33	14	8	5	–	–	–	6	–			
16	(Poland) (16) Janusz Kołodziej	12	12	–	–	–	–	–	–	–			
17	(Australia) (20) Davey Watt	12	–	–	–	–	–	6	–	6			
18	(Sweden) (16) Thomas H. Jonasson	8	–	–	–	–	–	–	8	–			
19	(Sweden) (16) Antonio Lindbäck	6	–	6	–	–	–	–	–	–			
20	(Poland) (16) Adrian Miedziński	6	–	–	–	–	6	–	–	–			
21	(Croatia) (16) Jurica Pavlic	5	–	–	–	–	–	–	–	5			
22	(Poland) (19) Piotr Protasiewicz	5	–	–	–	0	5	–	–	–			
23	(United Kingdom) (16) Scott Nicholls	4	–	–	–	–	–	4	–	–			
24	(Czech Republic) (16) Matěj Kůs	3	–	–	3	–	–	–	–	–			
25	(Denmark) (16) Leon Madsen	3	–	–	–	3	–	–	–	–			
26	(Sweden) (18) Ludvig Lindgren	2	–	–	–	–	–	–	2	–			
27	(Denmark) (17) Nicolai Klindt	1	–	–	–	1	–	–	–	–			
28	(Sweden) (17) Linus Sundström	1	–	–	–	–	–	–	1	–			
29	(Czech Republic) (17) Luboš Tomíček, Jr.	0	–	–	0	–	–	–	–	–			
30	(Poland) (17) Artur Mroczka	0	–	–	–	–	0	–	–	–			
31	(Slovenia) (17) Matija Duh	0	–	–	–	–	–	–	–	0			
32	(Czech Republic) (18) Zdeněk Simota	0	–	–	0	–	–	–	–	–			
Rider(s) not classified
	(Poland) (17) Damian Baliński	—	ns	–	–	–	–	–	–	–			
	(Sweden) (17) Simon Gustafsson	—	–	ns	–	–	–	–	–	–			
	(United Kingdom) (17) Ben Barker	—	–	–	–	–	–	ns	–	–			
	(Poland) (18) Maciej Janowski	—	ns	–	–	–	ns	–	–	–			
	(Sweden) (18) Dennis Andersson	—	–	ns	–	–	–	–	–	–			
	(Denmark) (18) Patrick Hougaard	—	–	–	–	ns	–	–	–	–			
	(United Kingdom) (18) Daniel King	—	–	–	–	–	–	ns	–	–			
	(Hungary) (18) József Tabaka	—	–	–	–	–	–	–	–	ns			
Pos.	Rider	Points	EUR (Poland)	SWE (Sweden)	CZE (Czech Republic)	DEN (Denmark)	POL (Poland)	GBR (United Kingdom)	SCA (Sweden)	CRO (Croatia)	NOR (Denmark)	ITA (Italy)	PL2 (Poland)

== See also ==
- motorcycle speedway
