= 2010 Speedway Grand Prix of Great Britain =

Speedway race in Cardiff, Wales

(United Kingdom) 2010 Speedway Grand Prix of Great Britain
- 2010 FIM British Speedway Grand Prix

Information
- Date: 10 July 2010
- City: (United Kingdom) Cardiff
- Event: 6 of 11 (128)
- Referee: (Sweden) Krister Gardell
- Jury President: (Finland) Ilkaa Teromaa

Stadium details
- Stadium: Millennium Stadium
- Length: 277 m (303 yd)

SGP Results
- Best Time
- (gold) Winner: (Australia) Chris Holder
- (silver) Runner-up: (Australia) Jason Crump
- (bronze) 3rd place: (Poland) Jaroslaw Hampel

The 2010 FIM British Speedway Grand Prix was the sixth race of the 2010 Speedway Grand Prix season. It took place on 10 July at the Millennium Stadium in Cardiff, Great Britain.

The British Grand Prix was won by Australian Chris Holder, who beat World Champion Jason Crump, Pole Jarosław Hampel and Dane Hans Andersen in the Final. It was first ever Holder' GP winning.

== Riders ==
The Speedway Grand Prix Commission nominated Scott Nicholls as Wild Card, and Ben Barker and Daniel King both as Track Reserves. Injured Emil Sayfutdinov was replaced by second Qualified Substitutes Davey Watt. The Draw was made on 9 July at 13:00 CEST by four-time World Champion Barry Briggs of New Zealand.

(3) (Russia) Emil Sayfutdinov → (20) (Australia) Davey Watt

== Heat details ==
Placing	Draw	Rider	Total	1	2	3	4	5	6	7	8	9	10	11	12	13	14	15	16	17	18	19	20	Pts	Pos	21	22	23
1	2	(Australia) (12) Chris Holder	19	3					2				2				1				2			10	4	3		3
2	11	(Australia) (1) Jason Crump	17			3				3		3					2						0	11	3		2	2
3	14	(Poland) (13) Jarosław Hampel	17				3		3					2		3							1	12	2		3	1
4	12	(Denmark) (10) Hans N. Andersen	10			1					1		3			1						2		8	6	2		0
5	4	(Poland) (2) Tomasz Gollob	12	1							3				2				3				3	12	1	R
6	10	(Sweden) (9) Fredrik Lindgren	10			2			1						3			3		0				9	5		1
7	1	(Poland) (7) Rune Holta	8	2				2				0				0				3				7	7	1
8	3	(Denmark) (6) Nicki Pedersen	7	0						1				3				2				1		7	8		0
9	9	(Denmark) (8) Kenneth Bjerre	7			0		1						1					2		3			7	9
10	7	(United States) (4) Greg Hancock	7		3					0					1	2					1			7	10
11	13	(Australia) (20) Davey Watt	6				0	3							0		3					F3x		6	11
12	6	(United Kingdom) (15) Tai Woffinden	6		0				0			2							1			3		6	12
13	15	(United Kingdom) (14) Chris Harris	6				2			2			0						0	2				6	13
14	5	(Sweden) (11) Magnus Zetterström	6		2			0					1					1					2	6	14
15	16	(United Kingdom) (16) Scott Nicholls	4				1				2	1						0			0			4	15
16	8	(Sweden) (5) Andreas Jonsson	2		1						0			0			0			1				2	16
17	17	(United Kingdom) (17) Ben Barker	-																					-	17
18	18	(United Kingdom) (18) Daniel King	-																					-	18
Placing	Draw	Rider	Total	1	2	3	4	5	6	7	8	9	10	11	12	13	14	15	16	17	18	19	20	Pts	Pos	21	22	23

e: retired or mechanical failure • m: exclusion for exceeding two minute time allowance • t: exclusion for touching the tapes • x: other exclusion • f: fell
ns: non-starter • nc: non-classify
Semi-finals: Heat 21: Riders placed 1st, 4th, 6th & 7th in the intermediate classification (after 20 heats)
Heat 22: Riders placed 2nd, 3rd, 5th & 8th in the intermediate classification (after 20 heats)
Big Final (heat 23): The first and second placed riders in each of the Semi-Finals

gate A – inside	gate B	gate C	gate D – outside

=== Heat after heat ===
1. Holder, Holta, Gollob, Pedersen
2. Hancock, Zetterström, Jonsson, Woffinden
3. Crump, Lindgren, Andersen, Bjerre
4. Hampel, Harris, Nicholls, Watt
5. Watt, Holta, Bjerre, Zetterström
6. Hampel, Holder, Lindgren, Woffinden
7. Crump, Harris, Pedersen, Hancock
8. Gollob, Nicholls, Andersen, Jonsson
9. Crump, Woffinden, Nicholls, Holta
10. Andersen, Holder, Zetterström, Harris
11. Pedersen, Hampel, Bjerre, Jonsson
12. Lindgren, Gollob, Hancock, Watt
13. Hampel, Hancock, Andersen, Holta
14. Watt, Crump, Holder, Jonsson
15. Lindgren, Pedersen, Zetterström, Nicholls
16. Gollob, Bjerre, Woffinden, Harris
17. Holta, Harris, Jonsson, Lindgren
18. Bjerre, Holder, Hancock, Nicholls
19. Woffinden, Andersen, Pedersen, Watt (F3x)
20. Gollob, Zetterström, Hampel, Crump
  Semi-Finals
21. Holder, Andersen, Holta, Gollob (R)
22. Hampel, Crump, Lindgren, Pedersen
  The Final
23. Holder, Crump, Hampel, Andersen

== The intermediate classification ==
Qualifies for next season's Grand Prix series
Full-time Grand Prix rider
Wild card, track reserve or qualified reserve

Pos.	Rider	Points	EUR (Poland)	SWE (Sweden)	CZE (Czech Republic)	DEN (Denmark)	POL (Poland)	GBR (United Kingdom)	SCA (Sweden)	CRO (Croatia)	NOR (Denmark)	ITA (Italy)	PL2 (Poland)
1	(Poland) (13) Jarosław Hampel	92	18	6	16	20	15	17					
2	(Poland) (2) Tomasz Gollob	90	6	16	17	15	24	12					
3	(Australia) (1) Jason Crump	75	19	7	7	10	15	17					
4	(Denmark) (8) Kenneth Bjerre	66	10	20	12	13	4	7					
5	(Australia) (12) Chris Holder	60	8	11	7	9	6	19					
6	(Poland) (7) Rune Holta	56	10	6	7	6	19	8					
7	(Denmark) (10) Hans N. Andersen	56	8	7	9	13	9	10					
8	(Denmark) (6) Nicki Pedersen	51	9	8	14	5	8	7					
9	(Sweden) (5) Andreas Jonsson	48	5	12	13	13	3	2					
10	(Sweden) (9) Fredrik Lindgren	43	8	4	7	8	6	10					
11	(Sweden) (11) Magnus Zetterström	43	4	9	11	7	6	6					
12	(United Kingdom) (14) Chris Harris	42	8	6	4	13	5	6					
13	(United States) (4) Greg Hancock	41	4	14	7	3	6	7					
14	(United Kingdom) (15) Tai Woffinden	28	1	4	5	5	7	6					
15	(Russia) (3) Emil Sayfutdinov	27	14	8	5	–	–	–					
16	(Poland) (16) Janusz Kołodziej	12	12	–	–	–	–	–					
17	(Sweden) (16) Antonio Lindbäck	6	–	6	–	–	–	–					
18	(Poland) (16) Adrian Miedziński	6	–	–	–	–	6	–					
19	(Australia) (20) Davey Watt	6	–	–	–	–	–	6					
20	(Poland) (19) Piotr Protasiewicz	5	–	–	–	0	5	–					
21	(United Kingdom) (16) Scott Nicholls	4	–	–	–	–	–	4					
22	(Czech Republic) (16) Matěj Kůs	3	–	–	3	–	–	–					
23	(Denmark) (16) Leon Madsen	3	–	–	–	3	–	–					
24	(Denmark) (17) Nicolai Klindt	1	–	–	–	1	–	–					
25	(Czech Republic) (17) Luboš Tomíček, Jr.	0	–	–	0	–	–	–					
26	(Poland) (17) Artur Mroczka	0	–	–	–	–	0	–					
27	(Czech Republic) (18) Zdeněk Simota	0	–	–	0	–	–	–					
Rider(s) not classified
	(Poland) (17) Damian Baliński	—	ns	–	–	–	–	–					
	(Sweden) (17) Simon Gustafsson	—	–	ns	–	–	–	–					
	(United Kingdom) (17) Ben Barker	—	–	–	–	–	–	ns					
	(Poland) (18) Maciej Janowski	—	ns	–	–	–	ns	–					
	(Sweden) (18) Dennis Andersson	—	–	ns	–	–	–	–					
	(Denmark) (18) Patrick Hougaard	—	–	–	–	ns	–	–					
	(United Kingdom) (18) Daniel King	—	–	–	–	–	–	ns					
Pos.	Rider	Points	EUR (Poland)	SWE (Sweden)	CZE (Czech Republic)	DEN (Denmark)	POL (Poland)	GBR (United Kingdom)	SCA (Sweden)	CRO (Croatia)	NOR (Denmark)	ITA (Italy)	PL2 (Poland)

== See also ==
- motorcycle speedway
