= 2010 Speedway Grand Prix of Poland =

- 2010 FIM Toruń Speedway Grand Prix of Poland

Information
- Date: 19 June 2010
- City: (Poland) Toruń
- Event: 5 of 11 (127)
- Referee: (Germany) Frank Ziegler
- Jury President: (Denmark) Jorgen L. Jensen

Stadium details
- Stadium: MotoArena Toruń
- Length: 325 m (355 yd)

SGP Results
- Best Time
- (gold) Winner: (Poland) Tomasz Gollob
- (silver) Runner-up: (Poland) Rune Holta
- (bronze) 3rd place: (Poland) Jaroslaw Hampel

The 2010 FIM Toruń Speedway Grand Prix of Poland was the fifth race of the 2010 Speedway Grand Prix season. It took place on 19 June at the MotoArena Toruń in Toruń, Poland.

The Polish Grand Prix, first hosted in Toruń, was won by Pole Tomasz Gollob, who beat Poles Rune Holta and Jarosław Hampel and Jason Crump of Australia. This was the first time in SGP history that the podium was won by riders from the same country.

== Riders ==
The Speedway Grand Prix Commission nominated Adrian Miedziński as a wild card, and Artur Mroczka and Maciej Janowski as track reserves. The injured Emil Sayfutdinov was replaced by first qualified substitutes Piotr Protasiewicz again. The draw was made on 18 June at 13:00 CEST by Michał Zalewski, president (mayor) of Toruń.

(3) (Russia) Emil Sayfutdinov → (19) (Poland) Piotr Protasiewicz

Hans N. Andersen, Chris Holder and Adrian Miedziński all rode for Unibax Toruń, whose home track is at the Motoarena, in the 2010 season in Poland.

== Heat details ==
Placing	Draw	Rider	Total	1	2	3	4	5	6	7	8	9	10	11	12	13	14	15	16	17	18	19	20	Pts	Pos	21	22	23
1	5	(Poland) (2) Tomasz Gollob	24		3			3					3					3					3	15	1	3		3
2	2	(Poland) (7) Rune Holta	19	3					3				2				3				1			12	3		3	2
3	12	(Poland) (13) Jarosław Hampel	15			3					3		1			3						1		11	4	2		1
4	13	(Australia) (1) Jason Crump	15				3	2							3		2					3		13	2		2	0
5	6	(Denmark) (10) Hans N. Andersen	9		1				2			2							1			2		8	5		1
6	7	(Denmark) (6) Nicki Pedersen	8		Fx					1					2	2					2			7	7	1
7	15	(United Kingdom) (15) Tai Woffinden	7				2			0			0						3	2				7	6	0
8	1	(Poland) (16) Adrian Miedziński	6	2				1				0				Fx				3				6	8		0
9	11	(Australia) (12) Chris Holder	6			1				2		3					Fx						-	6	9
10	14	(Sweden) (11) Magnus Zetterström	6				1		0					3		1							1	6	10
11	4	(Sweden) (9) Fredrik Lindgren	6	1							2				1				0				2	6	11
12	8	(United States) (4) Greg Hancock	6		2						1			2			1			0				6	12
13	9	(Poland) (19) Piotr Protasiewicz	5			0		0						0					2		3			5	13
14	10	(United Kingdom) (14) Chris Harris	5			2			1						0			1		1				5	14
15	3	(Denmark) (8) Kenneth Bjerre	4	0						3				1				0				0		4	15
16	16	(Sweden) (5) Andreas Jonsson	3				0				0	1						2			0			3	16
17	17	(Poland) (17) Artur Mroczka	0																				Fx	0	17
18	18	(Poland) (18) Maciej Janowski	-																					-	18
Placing	Draw	Rider	Total	1	2	3	4	5	6	7	8	9	10	11	12	13	14	15	16	17	18	19	20	Pts	Pos	21	22	23

e: retired or mechanical failure • m: exclusion for exceeding two minute time allowance • t: exclusion for touching the tapes • x: other exclusion • f: fell
ns: non-starter • nc: non-classify
Semi-finals: Heat 21: Riders placed 1st, 4th, 6th & 7th in the intermediate classification (after 20 heats)
Heat 22: Riders placed 2nd, 3rd, 5th & 8th in the intermediate classification (after 20 heats)
Big Final (heat 23): The first and second placed riders in each of the Semi-Finals

gate A – inside	gate B	gate C	gate D – outside

=== Heat after heat ===
1. Holta, Miedziński, Lindgren, Bjerre
2. Gollob, Hancock, Andersen, Pedersen (Fx)
3. Hampel, Harris, Holder, Protasiewicz
4. Crump, Woffinden, Zetterström, Jonsson
5. Gollob, Crump, Miedziński, Protasiewicz
6. Holta, Andersen, Harris, Zetterström
7. Bjerre, Holder, Pedersen, Woffinden
8. Hampel, Lindgren, Hancock, Jonsson
9. Holder, Andersen, Jonsson, Miedziński
10. Gollob, Holta, Hampel, Woffinden
11. Zetterström, Hancock, Bjerre, Protasiewicz
12. Crump, Pedersen, Lindgren, Harris
13. Hampel, Pedersen, Zetterström, Miedziński (Fx)
14. Holta, Crump, Hancock, Holder (Fx)
15. Gollob, Jonsson, Harris, Bjerre
16. Woffinden, Protasiewicz, Andersen, Lindgren
17. Miedziński, Woffinden, Harris, Hancock
18. Protasiewicz, Pedersen, Holta, Jonsson
19. Crump, Andersen, Hampel, Bjerre
20. Gollob, Lindgren, Zetterström, Mroczka (Fx)
  Semi-Finals:
21. Gollob, Hampel, Pedersen, Woffinden
22. Holta, Crump, Andersen, Miedziński
  the Final:
23. Gollob, Holta, Hampel, Crump

== The intermediate classification ==
Qualifies for next season's Grand Prix series
Full-time Grand Prix rider
Wild card, track reserve or qualified reserve

Pos.	Rider	Points	EUR (Poland)	SWE (Sweden)	CZE (Czech Republic)	DEN (Denmark)	POL (Poland)	GBR (United Kingdom)	SCA (Sweden)	CRO (Croatia)	NOR (Denmark)	ITA (Italy)	PL2 (Poland)
1	(Poland) (2) Tomasz Gollob	78	6	16	17	15	24						
2	(Poland) (13) Jarosław Hampel	75	18	6	16	20	15						
3	(Denmark) (8) Kenneth Bjerre	59	10	20	12	13	4						
4	(Australia) (1) Jason Crump	58	19	7	7	10	15						
5	(Poland) (7) Rune Holta	48	10	6	7	6	19						
6	(Sweden) (5) Andreas Jonsson	46	5	12	13	13	3						
7	(Denmark) (10) Hans N. Andersen	46	8	7	9	13	9						
8	(Denmark) (6) Nicki Pedersen	44	9	8	14	5	8						
9	(Australia) (12) Chris Holder	41	8	11	7	9	6						
10	(Sweden) (11) Magnus Zetterström	37	4	9	11	7	6						
11	(United Kingdom) (14) Chris Harris	36	8	6	4	13	5						
12	(United States) (4) Greg Hancock	34	4	14	7	3	6						
13	(Sweden) (9) Fredrik Lindgren	33	8	4	7	8	6						
14	(Russia) (3) Emil Sayfutdinov	27	14	8	5	–	–						
15	(United Kingdom) (15) Tai Woffinden	22	1	4	5	5	7						
16	(Poland) (16) Janusz Kołodziej	12	12	–	–	–	–						
17	(Sweden) (16) Antonio Lindbäck	6	–	6	–	–	–						
18	(Poland) (16) Adrian Miedziński	6	–	–	–	–	6						
19	(Poland) (19) Piotr Protasiewicz	5	–	–	–	0	5						
20	(Czech Republic) (16) Matěj Kůs	3	–	–	3	–	–						
21	(Denmark) (16) Leon Madsen	3	–	–	–	3	–						
22	(Denmark) (17) Nicolai Klindt	1	–	–	–	1	–						
23	(Czech Republic) (17) Luboš Tomíček, Jr.	0	–	–	0	–	–						
24	(Poland) (17) Artur Mroczka	0	–	–	–	–	0						
25	(Czech Republic) (18) Zdeněk Simota	0	–	–	0	–	–						
Rider(s) not classified
	(Poland) (17) Damian Baliński	—	ns	–	–	–	–						
	(Sweden) (17) Simon Gustafsson	—	–	ns	–	–	–						
	(Poland) (18) Maciej Janowski	—	ns	–	–	–	ns						
	(Sweden) (18) Dennis Andersson	—	–	ns	–	–	–						
	(Denmark) (18) Patrick Hougaard	—	–	–	–	ns	–						
Pos.	Rider	Points	EUR (Poland)	SWE (Sweden)	CZE (Czech Republic)	DEN (Denmark)	POL (Poland)	GBR (United Kingdom)	SCA (Sweden)	CRO (Croatia)	NOR (Denmark)	ITA (Italy)	PL2 (Poland)

== See also ==
- Motorcycle speedway
