= 2010 Speedway Grand Prix of Scandinavia =

(Sweden) 2010 Speedway Grand Prix of Scandinavia
- 2010 FIM Scandinavian Speedway Grand Prix

Information
- Date: 14 August 2010
- City: (Sweden) Målilla
- Event: 7 of 11 (129)
- Jury President: (Denmark) Jørgen L. Jensen

Stadium details
- Stadium: G&B Arena
- Length: 305 m (334 yd)

SGP Results
- Best Time
- (gold) Winner: (Poland) Rune Holta
- (silver) Runner-up: (Australia) Jason Crump
- (bronze) 3rd place: (Poland) Tomasz Gollob

The 2010 FIM Scandinavian Speedway Grand Prix was the seventh race of the 2010 Speedway Grand Prix season. It took place on 14 August at the G&B Arena in Målilla, Sweden.

The Grand Prix was won by Pole Rune Holta who beat World Champion Jason Crump, new Grand Prix leader Tomasz Gollob and host rider Fredrik Lindgren. It was second GP winning by Holta, after 2008 Swedish Grand Prix in Gothenburg.

== Riders ==
The Speedway Grand Prix Commission nominated Thomas H. Jonasson as Wild Card, and Linus Sundström and Ludvig Lindgren both as Track Reserves. The draw was made on 13 August by the Jury President Jørgen L. Jensen.

== Heat details ==
Placing	Draw	Rider	Total	1	2	3	4	5	6	7	8	9	10	11	12	13	14	15	16	17	18	19	20	Pts	Pos	21	22	23
1	3	(Poland) (7) Rune Holta	20	1						3				3				2				2		11	3		3	3
2	16	(Australia) (1) Jason Crump	15				3				2	0						1			3			9	6	2		2
3	10	(Poland) (2) Tomasz Gollob	17			3			3						3			3		X				12	1	3		1
4	15	(Sweden) (9) Fredrik Lindgren	11				2			1			1						3	2				9	8		2	R4
5	2	(United States) (4) Greg Hancock	12	3					2				3				3				0			11	2		1
6	6	(Poland) (13) Jarosław Hampel	10		3				1			3							2			0		9	4	1
7	1	(Denmark) (8) Kenneth Bjerre	9	2				3				1				0				3				9	5		0
8	11	(United Kingdom) (14) Chris Harris	9			1				2		2					1						3	9	7	0
9	13	(Sweden) (16) Thomas H. Jonasson	8				1	2							2		F4					3		8	9
10	9	(Sweden) (5) Andreas Jonsson	7			2		1						1					1		2			7	10
11	12	(Australia) (12) Chris Holder	6			0					0		2			3						1		6	11
12	8	(Russia) (3) Emil Sayfutdinov	6		1						1			2			2			F/-				6	12
13	7	(Denmark) (10) Hans N. Andersen	5		2					0					1	1					1			5	13
14	4	(Sweden) (11) Magnus Zetterström	3	0							3				0				0				0	3	14
15	14	(United Kingdom) (15) Tai Woffinden	3				0		0					0		2							1	3	15
16	18	(Sweden) (18) Ludvig Lindgren	2															0					2	2	16
17	17	(Sweden) (17) Linus Sundström	1										0							1				1	17
18	5	(Denmark) (6) Nicki Pedersen	0		Fx			R4					-					-					-	0	18
Placing	Draw	Rider	Total	1	2	3	4	5	6	7	8	9	10	11	12	13	14	15	16	17	18	19	20	Pts	Pos	21	22	23

e: retired or mechanical failure • m: exclusion for exceeding two minute time allowance • t: exclusion for touching the tapes • x: other exclusion • f: fell
ns: non-starter • nc: non-classify
Semi-finals: Heat 21: Riders placed 1st, 4th, 6th & 7th in the intermediate classification (after 20 heats)
Heat 22: Riders placed 2nd, 3rd, 5th & 8th in the intermediate classification (after 20 heats)
Big Final (heat 23): The first and second placed riders in each of the Semi-Finals

gate A – inside	gate B	gate C	gate D – outside

=== Heat after heat ===
1. Hancock, Bjerre, Holta, Zetterström
2. Hampel, Andersen, Sayfutdinov, Pedersen (F3x)
3. Gollob, Jonsson, Harris, Holder
4. Crump, F.Lindgren, Jonasson, Woffinden
5. Bjerre, Jonasson, Jonsson, Pedersen (R4)
6. Gollob, Hancock, Hampel, Woffinden
7. Holta, Harris, F.Lindgren, Andersen
8. Zetterström, Crump, Sayfutdinov, Holder
9. Hampel, Harris, Bjerre, Crump
10. Hancock, Holder, F.Lindgren, Sundström
11. Holta, Sayfutdinov, Jonsson, Woffinden
12. Gollob, Jonasson, Andersen, Zetterström
13. Holder, Woffinden, Andersen, Bjerre
14. Hancock, Sayfutdinov, Harris, Jonasson (R4)
15. Gollob, Holta, Crump, L.Lindgren
16. F.Lindgren, Hampel, Jonsson, Zetterström
17. Bjerre, F.Lindgren, Sundström, Sayfutdinov (F/-) Gollob (X)
18. Crump, Jonsson, Andersenm, Hancock
19. Jonasson, Holta, Holder, Hampel
20. Harris, L.Lindgren, Woffinden, Zetterström
  Semi-Finals:
21. Gollob, Crump, Hampel, Harris
22. Holta, F.Lindgren, Hancock, Bjerre
  The Final:
23. Holta (6 pts), Crump (4 pts), Gollob (2 pts), F.Lindgren (R4) (0 pts)

== The intermediate classification ==
Qualifies for next season's Grand Prix series
Full-time Grand Prix rider
Wild card, track reserve or qualified reserve

Pos.	Rider	Points	EUR (Poland)	SWE (Sweden)	CZE (Czech Republic)	DEN (Denmark)	POL (Poland)	GBR (United Kingdom)	SCA (Sweden)	CRO (Croatia)	NOR (Denmark)	ITA (Italy)	PL2 (Poland)
1	(Poland) (2) Tomasz Gollob	107	6	16	17	15	24	12	17				
2	(Poland) (13) Jarosław Hampel	102	18	6	16	20	15	17	10				
3	(Australia) (1) Jason Crump	90	19	7	7	10	15	17	15				
4	(Poland) (7) Rune Holta	76	10	6	7	6	19	8	20				
5	(Denmark) (8) Kenneth Bjerre	75	10	20	12	13	4	7	9				
6	(Australia) (12) Chris Holder	66	8	11	7	9	6	19	6				
7	(Denmark) (10) Hans N. Andersen	61	8	7	9	13	9	10	5				
8	(Sweden) (5) Andreas Jonsson	55	5	12	13	13	3	2	7				
9	(Sweden) (9) Fredrik Lindgren	54	8	4	7	8	6	10	11				
10	(United States) (4) Greg Hancock	53	4	14	7	3	6	7	12				
11	(Denmark) (6) Nicki Pedersen	51	9	8	14	5	8	7	0				
12	(United Kingdom) (14) Chris Harris	51	8	6	4	13	5	6	9				
13	(Sweden) (11) Magnus Zetterström	46	4	9	11	7	6	6	3				
14	(Russia) (3) Emil Sayfutdinov	33	14	8	5	–	–	–	6				
15	(United Kingdom) (15) Tai Woffinden	31	1	4	5	5	7	6	3				
16	(Poland) (16) Janusz Kołodziej	12	12	–	–	–	–	–	–				
17	(Sweden) (16) Thomas H. Jonasson	8	–	–	–	–	–	–	8				
18	(Sweden) (16) Antonio Lindbäck	6	–	6	–	–	–	–	–				
19	(Poland) (16) Adrian Miedziński	6	–	–	–	–	6	–	–				
20	(Australia) (20) Davey Watt	6	–	–	–	–	–	6	–				
21	(Poland) (19) Piotr Protasiewicz	5	–	–	–	0	5	–	–				
22	(United Kingdom) (16) Scott Nicholls	4	–	–	–	–	–	4	–				
23	(Czech Republic) (16) Matěj Kůs	3	–	–	3	–	–	–	–				
24	(Denmark) (16) Leon Madsen	3	–	–	–	3	–	–	–				
25	(Sweden) (18) Ludvig Lindgren	2	–	–	–	–	–	–	2				
26	(Denmark) (17) Nicolai Klindt	1	–	–	–	1	–	–	–				
27	(Sweden) (17) Linus Sundström	1	–	–	–	–	–	–	1				
28	(Czech Republic) (17) Luboš Tomíček, Jr.	0	–	–	0	–	–	–	–				
29	(Poland) (17) Artur Mroczka	0	–	–	–	–	0	–	–				
30	(Czech Republic) (18) Zdeněk Simota	0	–	–	0	–	–	–	–				
Rider(s) not classified
	(Poland) (17) Damian Baliński	—	ns	–	–	–	–	–	–				
	(Sweden) (17) Simon Gustafsson	—	–	ns	–	–	–	–	–				
	(United Kingdom) (17) Ben Barker	—	–	–	–	–	–	ns	–				
	(Poland) (18) Maciej Janowski	—	ns	–	–	–	ns	–	–				
	(Sweden) (18) Dennis Andersson	—	–	ns	–	–	–	–	–				
	(Denmark) (18) Patrick Hougaard	—	–	–	–	ns	–	–	–				
	(United Kingdom) (18) Daniel King	—	–	–	–	–	–	ns	–				
Pos.	Rider	Points	EUR (Poland)	SWE (Sweden)	CZE (Czech Republic)	DEN (Denmark)	POL (Poland)	GBR (United Kingdom)	SCA (Sweden)	CRO (Croatia)	NOR (Denmark)	ITA (Italy)	PL2 (Poland)

== See also ==
- motorcycle speedway
