= 2010 Speedway Grand Prix of Czech Republic =

- 2010 FIM Czech Republic Speedway Grand Prix

Information
- Date: 22 May 2010
- City: (Czech Republic) Prague
- Event: 3 of 11 (125)
- Referee: (Poland) Wojciech Grodzki
- Jury President: (Germany) Wolfgang Glas

Stadium details
- Stadium: Stadium Marketa
- Length: 353 m (386 yd)

SGP Results
- Best Time
- (gold) Winner: (Poland) Tomasz Gollob
- (silver) Runner-up: (Denmark) Nicki Pedersen
- (bronze) 3rd place: (Poland) Jaroslaw Hampel

The 2010 FIM Czech Republic Speedway Grand Prix was the third race of the 2010 Speedway Grand Prix season. It took place on 22 May at the Stadium Marketa in Prague, Czech Republic.

The Grand Prix was won by Pole Tomasz Gollob, who beat Nicki Pedersen, Jarosław Hampel and Magnus Zetterström in the final.

== Starting positions draw ==
The Speedway Grand Prix Commission nominated Matěj Kůs as Wild Card, and Luboš Tomíček, Jr. and Zdeněk Simota both as Track Reserves. The Draw was made on 21 May at 13:00 CEST by Tomáš Chalupa, the Mayor of the municipal district Prague 6.

== Heat details ==
Placing	Draw	Rider	Total	1	2	3	4	5	6	7	8	9	10	11	12	13	14	15	16	17	18	19	20	Pts	Pos	21	22	23
1	13	(Poland) (2) Tomasz Gollob	17				1	1							3		3					0		8	6	3		3
2	14	(Denmark) (6) Nicki Pedersen	14				0		3					2		T/-							3	8	5		2	2
3	6	(Poland) (13) Jarosław Hampel	16		2				2			3							3			1		11	3		3	1
4	10	(Sweden) (11) Magnus Zetterström	11			2			1						2			2		2				9	4	2		0
5	8	(Sweden) (5) Andreas Jonsson	13		3						2			3			2			3				13	1	F3x
6	12	(Denmark) (8) Kenneth Bjerre	12			3					0		3			3						2		11	2		1
7	1	(Denmark) (10) Hans N. Andersen	9	2				2				2				1				1				8	7	1
8	3	(Australia) (1) Jason Crump	7	0						1				F2				3				3		7	8		0
9	7	(Poland) (7) Rune Holta	7		0					2					0	2					3			7	9
10	15	(Sweden) (9) Fredrik Lindgren	7				3			0			2						2	T/-				7	10
11	9	(Australia) (12) Chris Holder	7			0		3						1					1		2			7	11
12	11	(United States) (4) Greg Hancock	7			1				3		1					1						1	7	12
13	16	(Russia) (3) Emil Sayfutdinov	5				2				3	0						F4x			-			5	13
14	4	(United Kingdom) (15) Tai Woffinden	5	3							1				1				0				0	5	14
15	5	(United Kingdom) (14) Chris Harris	4		1			R					0					1					2	4	15
16	2	(Czech Republic) (16) Matěj Kůs	3	1					0				1				0				1			3	16
17	17	(Czech Republic) (17) Luboš Tomíček, Jr.	0													0					F3x			0	17
18	18	(Czech Republic) (18) Zdeněk Simota	0																	0				0	18
Placing	Draw	Rider	Total	1	2	3	4	5	6	7	8	9	10	11	12	13	14	15	16	17	18	19	20	Pts	Pos	21	22	23

e: retired or mechanical failure • m: exclusion for exceeding two minute time allowance • t: exclusion for touching the tapes • x: other exclusion • f: fell
ns: non-starter • nc: non-classify
Semi-finals: Heat 21: Riders placed 1st, 4th, 6th & 7th in the intermediate classification (after 20 heats)
Heat 22: Riders placed 2nd, 3rd, 5th & 8th in the intermediate classification (after 20 heats)
Big Final (heat 23): The first and second placed riders in each of the Semi-Finals

gate A – inside	gate B	gate C	gate D – outside

=== Heat after heat ===
1. Woffinden, Andersen, Kůs, Crump
2. Jonsson, Hampel, Harris, Holta
3. Bjerre, Zetterström, Hancock, Holder
4. Lindgren, Sayfutdinov, Gollob, Pedersen
5. Holder, Andersen, Gollob, Harris (T/start)
6. Pedersen, Hampel, Zetterström, Kůs
7. Hancock, Holta, Crump, Lindgren
8. Sayfutdinov, Jonsson, Woffinden, Bjerre
9. Hampel, Andersen, Hancock, Sayfutdinov
10. Bjerre, Lindgren, Kůs, Harris
11. Jonsson, Pedersen, Holder, Crump (F2)
12. Gollob, Zetterström, Woffinden, Holta
13. Bjerre, Holta, Andersen, Tomíček (Pedersen - T)
14. Gollob, Jonsson, Hancock, Kůs
15. Crump, Zetterström, Harris, Sayfutdinov (F4x)
16. Hampel, Lindgren, Holder, Woffinden
17. Jonsson, Zetterström, Andersen, Simota (Lindgren - T)
18. Holta, Holder, Kůs, Tomíček (F3x)
19. Crump, Bjerre, Hampel, Gollob
20. Pedersen, Harris, Hancock, Woffinden
  Semi-Finals:
21. Gollob, Zetterström, Andersen, Jonsson (F3x)
22. Hampel, Pedersen, Bjerre, Crump
  The Final:
23. Gollob, Pedersen, Hampel, Zetterström

== The intermediate classification ==
Qualifies for next season's Grand Prix series
Full-time Grand Prix rider
Wild card, track reserve or qualified reserve

Pos.	Rider	Points	EUR (Poland)	SWE (Sweden)	CZE (Czech Republic)	DEN (Denmark)	POL (Poland)	GBR (United Kingdom)	SCA (Sweden)	CRO (Croatia)	NOR (Denmark)	ITA (Italy)	PL2 (Poland)
1	(Denmark) (8) Kenneth Bjerre	42	10	20	12								
2	(Poland) (13) Jarosław Hampel	40	18	6	16								
3	(Poland) (2) Tomasz Gollob	39	6	16	17								
4	(Australia) (1) Jason Crump	33	19	7	7								
5	(Denmark) (6) Nicki Pedersen	31	9	8	14								
6	(Sweden) (5) Andreas Jonsson	30	5	12	13								
7	(Russia) (3) Emil Sayfutdinov	27	14	8	5								
8	(Australia) (12) Chris Holder	26	8	11	7								
9	(United States) (4) Greg Hancock	25	4	14	7								
10	(Denmark) (10) Hans N. Andersen	24	8	7	9								
11	(Sweden) (11) Magnus Zetterström	24	4	9	11								
12	(Poland) (7) Rune Holta	23	10	6	7								
13	(Sweden) (9) Fredrik Lindgren	19	8	4	7								
14	(United Kingdom) (14) Chris Harris	18	8	6	4								
15	(Poland) (16) Janusz Kołodziej	12	12	–	–								
16	(United Kingdom) (15) Tai Woffinden	10	1	4	5								
17	(Sweden) (16) Antonio Lindbäck	6	–	6	–								
18	(Czech Republic) (16) Matěj Kůs	3	–	–	3								
19	(Czech Republic) (17) Luboš Tomíček, Jr.	0	–	–	0								
20	(Czech Republic) (18) Zdeněk Simota	0	–	–	0								
Rider(s) not classified
	(Poland) (17) Damian Baliński	—	ns	–	–								
	(Sweden) (17) Simon Gustafsson	—	–	ns	–								
	(Poland) (18) Maciej Janowski	—	ns	–	–								
	(Sweden) (18) Dennis Andersson	—	–	ns	–								
Pos.	Rider	Points	EUR (Poland)	SWE (Sweden)	CZE (Czech Republic)	DEN (Denmark)	POL (Poland)	GBR (United Kingdom)	SCA (Sweden)	CRO (Croatia)	NOR (Denmark)	ITA (Italy)	PL2 (Poland)

== See also ==
- motorcycle speedway
