= 2010 Speedway Grand Prix of Denmark =

- 2010 FIM Dansk Metal Danish Speedway Grand Prix

Information
- Date: 5 June 2010
- City: (Denmark) Copenhagen
- Event: 4 of 11 (126)
- Referee: (United Kingdom) Tony Steele
- Jury President: (Sweden) Christer Bergstrøm

Stadium details
- Stadium: Parken Stadium
- Length: 275 m (301 yd)

SGP Results
- Best Time
- (gold) Winner: (Poland) Jarosław Hampel
- (silver) Runner-up: (Poland) Tomasz Gollob
- (bronze) 3rd place: (United Kingdom) Chris Harris

The 2010 FIM Dansk Metal Danish Speedway Grand Prix was the fourth race of the 2010 Speedway Grand Prix season. It took place on 5 June at the Parken Stadium in Copenhagen, Denmark.

The Danish Grand Prix was won by Pole Jarosław Hampel, who beat Tomasz Gollob, Chris Harris and Hans N. Andersen in the final.

== Riders ==
Injured Emil Sayfutdinov will be replaced by first Qualified Substitutes Piotr Protasiewicz. The Speedway Grand Prix Commission nominated Leon Madsen as Wild Card, and Nicolai Klindt and Patrick Hougaard both as Track Reserves. The Draw was made on 4 June at 13:00 CEST by Hans Christian Schmidt, Danish Ministry of Transport.

(3) (Russia) Emil Sayfutdinov → (19) (Poland) Piotr Protasiewicz

== Heat details ==
Placing	Draw	Rider	Total	1	2	3	4	5	6	7	8	9	10	11	12	13	14	15	16	17	18	19	20	Pts	Pos	21	22	23
1	4	(Poland) (13) Jarosław Hampel	20	3							2				3				3				0	11	3		3	3
2	13	(Poland) (2) Tomasz Gollob	15				3	1							0		2					3		9	5		2	2
3	14	(United Kingdom) (14) Chris Harris	13				1		3					2		2							1	9	7	2		1
4	15	(Denmark) (10) Hans N. Andersen	13				0			2			3						2	3				10	4	3		0
5	11	(Sweden) (5) Andreas Jonsson	13			3				3		2					3						2	13	1	0
6	7	(Denmark) (8) Kenneth Bjerre	13		3					1					2	3					3			12	2		1
7	5	(Australia) (1) Jason Crump	10		1			0					2					3					3	9	6	1
8	12	(Australia) (12) Chris Holder	9			2					3		1			1						2		9	8		F4x
9	16	(Sweden) (9) Fredrik Lindgren	8				2				Fx	3						2			1			8	9
10	8	(Sweden) (11) Magnus Zetterström	7		2						1			3			0			1				7	10
11	10	(Poland) (7) Rune Holta	6			T/-			2						1			1		2				6	11
12	1	(United Kingdom) (15) Tai Woffinden	5	2				3				0				0				F4x				5	12
13	9	(Denmark) (6) Nicki Pedersen	5			0		2						1					0		2			5	13
14	2	(Denmark) (16) Leon Madsen	3	1					1				0				1				0			3	14
15	6	(United States) (4) Greg Hancock	3		0				0			1							1			1		3	15
16	17	(Denmark) (17) Nicolai Klindt	1			1																		1	16
17	3	(Poland) (19) Piotr Protasiewicz	0	0						0				0				0				0		0	17
18	18	(Denmark) (18) Patrick Hougaard	-																					-	18
Placing	Draw	Rider	Total	1	2	3	4	5	6	7	8	9	10	11	12	13	14	15	16	17	18	19	20	Pts	Pos	21	22	23

e: retired or mechanical failure • m: exclusion for exceeding two minute time allowance • t: exclusion for touching the tapes • x: other exclusion • f: fell
ns: non-starter • nc: non-classify
Semi-finals: Heat 21: Riders placed 1st, 4th, 6th & 7th in the intermediate classification (after 20 heats)
Heat 22: Riders placed 2nd, 3rd, 5th & 8th in the intermediate classification (after 20 heats)
Big Final (heat 23): The first and second placed riders in each of the Semi-Finals

gate A – inside	gate B	gate C	gate D – outside

=== Heat after heat ===
1. Hampel, Woffinden, Madsen, Protasiewicz
2. Bjerre, Zetterstroem, Crump, Hancock
3. Jonsson, Holder, Klindt, Pedersen (Holta - t)
4. Gollob, Lindgren, Harris, Andersen
5. Woffinden, Pedersen, Gollob, Crump
6. Harris, Holta, Madsen, Hancock
7. Jonsson, Andersen, Bjerre, Protasiewicz
8. Holder, Hampel, Zetterstroem, Lindgren (Fx)
9. Lindgren, Jonsson, Hancock, Woffinden
10. Andersen, Crump, Holder, Madsen
11. Zetterstroem, Harris, Pedersen, Protasiewicz
12. Hampel, Bjerre, Holta, Gollob
13. Bjerre, Harris, Holder, Woffinden
14. Jonsson, Gollob, Madsen, Zetterstroem
15. Crump, Lindgren, Holta, Protasiewicz
16. Hampel, Andersen, Hancock, Pedersen
17. Andersen, Holta, Zetterstroem, Woffinden (F4x)
18. Bjerre, Pedersen, Lindgren, Madsen
19. Gollob, Holder, Hancock, Protasiewicz
20. Crump, Jonsson, Harris, Hampel
  Semi-finals:
21. Andersen, Harris, Crump, Jonsson
22. Hampel, Gollob, Bjerre, Holder (F4x)
  the Final
23. Hampel, Gollob, Harris, Andersen

== The intermediate classification ==
Qualifies for next season's Grand Prix series
Full-time Grand Prix rider
Wild card, track reserve or qualified reserve

Pos.	Rider	Points	EUR (Poland)	SWE (Sweden)	CZE (Czech Republic)	DEN (Denmark)	POL (Poland)	GBR (United Kingdom)	SCA (Sweden)	CRO (Croatia)	NOR (Denmark)	ITA (Italy)	PL2 (Poland)
1	(Poland) (13) Jarosław Hampel	60	18	6	16	20							
2	(Denmark) (8) Kenneth Bjerre	55	10	20	12	13							
3	(Poland) (2) Tomasz Gollob	54	6	16	17	15							
4	(Australia) (1) Jason Crump	43	19	7	7	10							
5	(Sweden) (5) Andreas Jonsson	43	5	12	13	13							
6	(Denmark) (10) Hans N. Andersen	37	8	7	9	13							
7	(Denmark) (6) Nicki Pedersen	36	9	8	14	5							
8	(Australia) (12) Chris Holder	35	8	11	7	9							
9	(Sweden) (11) Magnus Zetterström	31	4	9	11	7							
10	(United Kingdom) (14) Chris Harris	31	8	6	4	13							
11	(Poland) (7) Rune Holta	29	10	6	7	6							
12	(United States) (4) Greg Hancock	28	4	14	7	3							
13	(Russia) (3) Emil Sayfutdinov	27	14	8	5	–							
14	(Sweden) (9) Fredrik Lindgren	27	8	4	7	8							
15	(United Kingdom) (15) Tai Woffinden	15	1	4	5	5							
16	(Poland) (16) Janusz Kołodziej	12	12	–	–	–							
17	(Sweden) (16) Antonio Lindbäck	6	–	6	–	–							
18	(Czech Republic) (16) Matěj Kůs	3	–	–	3	–							
19	(Denmark) (16) Leon Madsen	3	–	–	–	3							
20	(Denmark) (17) Nicolai Klindt	1	–	–	–	1							
21	(Czech Republic) (17) Luboš Tomíček, Jr.	0	–	–	0	–							
22	(Czech Republic) (18) Zdeněk Simota	0	–	–	0	–							
23	(Poland) (19) Piotr Protasiewicz	0	–	–	–	0							
Rider(s) not classified
	(Poland) (17) Damian Baliński	—	ns	–	–	–							
	(Sweden) (17) Simon Gustafsson	—	–	ns	–	–							
	(Poland) (18) Maciej Janowski	—	ns	–	–	–							
	(Sweden) (18) Dennis Andersson	—	–	ns	–	–							
	(Denmark) (18) Patrick Hougaard	—	–	–	–	ns							
Pos.	Rider	Points	EUR (Poland)	SWE (Sweden)	CZE (Czech Republic)	DEN (Denmark)	POL (Poland)	GBR (United Kingdom)	SCA (Sweden)	CRO (Croatia)	NOR (Denmark)	ITA (Italy)	PL2 (Poland)

== See also ==
- motorcycle speedway
