= 2010 Speedway Grand Prix of Sweden =

- 2010 FIM Dig Deep Streetwear Swedish Grand Prix

Information
- Date: 8 May 2010
- City: (Sweden) Gothenburg
- Event: 2 of 11 (124)
- Referee: (Germany) Frank Ziegler
- Jury President: (Finland) Illka Teromaa

Stadium details
- Stadium: Ullevi
- Length: 400 m (440 yd)

SGP Results
- Best Time: (Denmark) Kenneth Bjerre; 69.6 secs (in Heat 22)
- (gold) Winner: (Denmark) Kenneth Bjerre
- (silver) Runner-up: (Poland) Tomasz Gollob
- (bronze) 3rd place: (Sweden) Andreas Jonsson

The 2010 FIM Dig Deep Streetwear Swedish Grand Prix was the second race of the 2010 Speedway Grand Prix season. It took place on 8 May 2010 at the Ullevi stadium in Gothenburg, Sweden. The Swedish Grand Prix was won by Dane Kenneth Bjerre who beat Tomasz Gollob, Andreas Jonsson and Greg Hancock in the final. It was first GP winning for Bjerre.

== Riders ==
The Speedway Grand Prix Commission nominated Antonio Lindbäck as Wild Card, and Simon Gustafsson and Dennis Andersson both as Track Reserves. The Draw was made on May 7 at 13:00 CEST.

== Heat details ==
Placing	Draw	Rider	Total	1	2	3	4	5	6	7	8	9	10	11	12	13	14	15	16	17	18	19	20	Pts	Pos	21	22	23
1	6	(Denmark) (8) Kenneth Bjerre	20		1				3			3							2			2		11	2		3	3
2	14	(Poland) (2) Tomasz Gollob	16				1		2					3		1							2	9	4	3		2
3	10	(Sweden) (5) Andreas Jonsson	12			3			0						0			3		2				8	5		2	1
4	8	(United States) (4) Greg Hancock	14		3						1			2			3			3				12	1	2		0
5	16	(Australia) (12) Chris Holder	11				3				2	1						2			2			10	3		1
6	12	(Sweden) (11) Magnus Zetterström	9			2					3		3			0						0		8	6	1
7	11	(Russia) (3) Emil Sayfutdinov	8			0				3		2					0						3	8	7	0
8	13	(Denmark) (6) Nicki Pedersen	8				0	2							3		2					1		8	8		F3
9	9	(Australia) (1) Jason Crump	7			1		0						0					3		3			7	9
10	1	(Denmark) (10) Hans N. Andersen	7	3				1				0				3				Fx				7	10
11	5	(Poland) (7) Rune Holta	6		2			3					0					1					0	6	11
12	3	(Sweden) (16) Antonio Lindbäck	6	1						1				1				0				3		6	12
13	7	(Poland) (13) Jarosław Hampel	6		0					2					2	2					0			6	13
14	15	(United Kingdom) (14) Chris Harris	6				2			F4			2						1	1				6	14
15	4	(Sweden) (9) Fredrik Lindgren	4	2							0				1				0				1	4	15
16	2	(United Kingdom) (15) Tai Woffinden	4	0					1				1				1				1			4	16
17	17	(Sweden) (17) Simon Gustafsson	-																					-	17
18	18	(Sweden) (18) Dennis Andersson	-																					-	18
Placing	Draw	Rider	Total	1	2	3	4	5	6	7	8	9	10	11	12	13	14	15	16	17	18	19	20	Pts	Pos	21	22	23

e: retired or mechanical failure • m: exclusion for exceeding two minute time allowance • t: exclusion for touching the tapes • x: other exclusion • f: fell
ns: non-starter • nc: non-classify
Semi-finals: Heat 21: Riders placed 1st, 4th, 6th & 7th in the intermediate classification (after 20 heats)
Heat 22: Riders placed 2nd, 3rd, 5th & 8th in the intermediate classification (after 20 heats)
Big Final (heat 23): The first and second placed riders in each of the Semi-Finals

gate A – inside	gate B	gate C	gate D – outside

=== Heat after heat ===
1. (69.9) Andersen, Lindgren, Lindbäck, Woffinden
2. (71.0) Hancock, Holta, Bjerre, Hampel
3. (71.1) Jonsson, Zetterström, Crump, Sayfutdinov
4. (71.0) Holder, Harris, Gollob, Pedersen
5. (72.6) Holta, Pedersen, Andersen, Crump
6. (72.6) Bjerre, Gollob, Woffinden, Jonsson
7. (72.8) Sayfutdinov, Hampel, Lindbäck, Harris (F3)
8. (72.5) Zetterström, Holder, Hancock, Lindgren
9. (72.6) Bjerre, Sayfutdinov, Holder, Andersen
10. (72.2) Zetterström, Harris, Woffinden, Holta
11. (72.0) Gollob, Hancock, Lindbäck, Crump
12. (72.1) Pedersen, Hampel, Lindgren, Jonsson
13. (71.6) Andersen, Hampel, Gollob, Zetterström
14. (71.2) Hancock, Pedersen, Woffinden, Sayfutdinov
15. (71.1) Jonsson, Holder, Holta, Lindbäck
16. (71.1) Crump, Bjerre, Harris, Lindgren
17. (70.7) Hancock, Jonsson, Harris, Andersen (Fx)
18. (70.7) Crump, Holder, Woffinden, Hampel
19. (70.6) Lindbäck, Bjerre, Pedersen, Zetterström
20. (70.2) Sayfutdinov, Gollob, Lindgren, Holta
  Semi-Finals:
21. (70.1) Gollob, Hancock, Zetterström, Sayfutdinov
22. (69.6) Bjerre, Jonsson, Holder, Pedersen (F4)
  The Final:
23. (70.0) Bjerre, Gollob, Jonsson, Hancock

== The intermediate classification ==
Qualifies for next season's Grand Prix series
Full-time Grand Prix rider
Wild card, track reserve or qualified reserve

Pos.	Rider	Points	EUR (Poland)	SWE (Sweden)	CZE (Czech Republic)	DEN (Denmark)	POL (Poland)	GBR (United Kingdom)	SCA (Sweden)	CRO (Croatia)	NOR (Denmark)	ITA (Italy)	PL2 (Poland)
1	(Denmark) (8) Kenneth Bjerre	30	10	20									
2	(Australia) (1) Jason Crump	26	19	7									
3	(Poland) (13) Jarosław Hampel	24	18	6									
4	(Poland) (2) Tomasz Gollob	22	6	16									
5	(Russia) (3) Emil Sayfutdinov	22	14	8									
6	(Australia) (12) Chris Holder	19	8	11									
7	(United States) (4) Greg Hancock	18	4	14									
8	(Sweden) (5) Andreas Jonsson	17	5	12									
9	(Denmark) (6) Nicki Pedersen	17	9	8									
10	(Poland) (7) Rune Holta	16	10	6									
11	(Denmark) (10) Hans N. Andersen	15	8	7									
12	(United Kingdom) (14) Chris Harris	14	8	6									
13	(Sweden) (11) Magnus Zetterström	13	4	9									
14	(Sweden) (9) Fredrik Lindgren	12	8	4									
15	(Poland) (16) Janusz Kołodziej	12	12	–									
16	(Sweden) (16) Antonio Lindbäck	6	–	6									
17	(United Kingdom) (15) Tai Woffinden	5	1	4									
Rider(s) not classified
	(Poland) (17) Damian Baliński	—	ns	–									
	(Sweden) (17) Simon Gustafsson	—	–	ns									
	(Poland) (18) Maciej Janowski	—	ns	–									
	(Sweden) (18) Dennis Andersson	—	–	ns									
Pos.	Rider	Points	EUR (Poland)	SWE (Sweden)	CZE (Czech Republic)	DEN (Denmark)	POL (Poland)	GBR (United Kingdom)	SCA (Sweden)	CRO (Croatia)	NOR (Denmark)	ITA (Italy)	PL2 (Poland)

== See also ==
- Motorcycle speedway
