= 2010 Speedway Grand Prix =

16th season of the Speedway Grand Prix

Season details
- Dates: April 24 – October 9
- Events: 11
- Cities: 11
- Countries: 7
- Riders: 15 permanents 1 wild card(s); 2 track reserves
- Heats: 253 (in 11 events)

Winners
- Champion: POL Tomasz Gollob
- Runner-up: POL Jarosław Hampel
- 3rd place: AUS Jason Crump

The 2010 Speedway Grand Prix was the 65th edition of the official World Championship and the 16th season of the Speedway Grand Prix era, deciding the FIM Speedway World Championship. It was the tenth series under the promotion of Benfield Sports International, an IMG company. The series began on 24 April in Leszno and finished on 9 October in Bydgoszcz.

The only rider to win more than one round, Tomasz Gollob claimed his first Speedway Grand Prix title after over a decade in the sport. Jarosław Hampel completed a Polish 1–2, claiming his first SGP win in Denmark ahead of Gollob. Reigning champion Jason Crump finished third in the standings; the tenth successive season in which Crump finished in the top three places.

== Qualification ==
For the 2010 season there was 15 permanent riders, joined at each Grand Prix by one wild card and two track reserves.

=== 2009 Grand Prix ===
The top eight riders from the 2009 championship qualified as of right:

- (Australia) (1) Jason Crump
- (Poland) (2) Tomasz Gollob
- (Russia) (3) Emil Sayfutdinov
- (United States) (4) Greg Hancock
- (Sweden) (5) Andreas Jonsson
- (Denmark) (6) Nicki Pedersen
- (Poland) (7) Rune Holta
- (Denmark) (8) Kenneth Bjerre

=== Grand Prix Challenge ===
The top eight riders from the 2009 championship were joined by three riders who qualified via the Grand Prix Challenge.

- (Sweden) (11) Magnus Zetterström
- (Australia) (12) Chris Holder
- (Poland) (13) Jarosław Hampel

=== Nominations ===
The final four riders were nominated by series promoters, Benfield Sports International, following the completion of the 2009 season. Riders were nominated after the season ended on October 13, 2009.

- (Sweden) (9) Fredrik Lindgren (9th placed in 2009 Grand Prix and 4th in Grand Prix Challenge)
- (Denmark) (10) Hans N. Andersen (10th placed in 2009 Grand Prix)
- (United Kingdom) (14) Chris Harris (14th placed in 2009 Grand Prix and 5th in Grand Prix Challenge)
- (United Kingdom) (15) Tai Woffinden

=== Qualified Substitutes ===
- (Poland) (19) Piotr Protasiewicz
- (Australia) (20) Davey Watt
- (Germany) (21) Martin Smolinski
- (Poland) (22) Adrian Miedziński
- (Poland) (23) Grzegorz Walasek
- (Czech Republic) (24) Lukáš Dryml

== Calendar ==
Round	Date	City and venue	Winner	Runner-up	3rd placed	4th placed	Results
1	April 24	Leszno , Poland; Alfred Smoczyk Stadium	(Australia) Jason Crump	(Poland) Jarosław Hampel	(Russia) Emil Sayfutdinov	(Poland) Janusz Kołodziej	results
2	May 8	(Sweden) Gothenburg , Sweden; Ullevi	(Denmark) Kenneth Bjerre	(Poland) Tomasz Gollob	(Sweden) Andreas Jonsson	(United States) Greg Hancock	results
3	May 22	(Czech Republic) Prague , Czech Republic; Markéta Stadium	(Poland) Tomasz Gollob	(Denmark) Nicki Pedersen	(Poland) Jarosław Hampel	(Sweden) Magnus Zetterström	results
4	June 5	(Denmark) Copenhagen , Denmark; Parken Stadium	(Poland) Jarosław Hampel	(Poland) Tomasz Gollob	(United Kingdom) Chris Harris	(Denmark) Hans N. Andersen	results
5	June 19	(Poland) Toruń , Poland; MotoArena Toruń	(Poland) Tomasz Gollob	(Poland) Rune Holta	(Poland) Jarosław Hampel	(Australia) Jason Crump	results
6	July 10	(United Kingdom) Cardiff , Great Britain; Millennium Stadium	(Australia) Chris Holder	(Australia) Jason Crump	(Poland) Jarosław Hampel	(Denmark) Hans N. Andersen	results
7	August 14	Målilla , Sweden; G&B Stadium	(Poland) Rune Holta	(Australia) Jason Crump	(Poland) Tomasz Gollob	(Sweden) Fredrik Lindgren	results
8	~~August 28~~; August 29	(Croatia) Goričan , Croatia; Stadium Milenium	(United States) Greg Hancock	(United Kingdom) Chris Harris	(Australia) Jason Crump	(Sweden) Fredrik Lindgren	results
9	September 11	(Denmark) Vojens , Denmark; Speedway Center	(Poland) Tomasz Gollob	(Denmark) Kenneth Bjerre	(Australia) Jason Crump	(Denmark) Nicki Pedersen	results
10	September 25	(Italy) Terenzano , Italy; Pista Olimpia Terenzano	(Poland) Tomasz Gollob	(United Kingdom) Chris Harris	(United States) Greg Hancock	(Denmark) Nicki Pedersen	results
11	October 9	Bydgoszcz , Poland; Polonia Stadium	(Sweden) Andreas Jonsson	(United Kingdom) Chris Harris	(Poland) Janusz Kołodziej	(Poland) Rune Holta	results

== Classification ==
Qualifies for next season's Grand Prix series
Full-time Grand Prix rider
Wild card, track reserve or qualified reserve

Pos.	Rider	Points	EUR (Poland)	SWE (Sweden)	CZE (Czech Republic)	DEN (Denmark)	POL (Poland)	GBR (United Kingdom)	SCA (Sweden)	CRO (Croatia)	NOR (Denmark)	ITA (Italy)	PL2 (Poland)
Gold	(Poland) (2) Tomasz Gollob	166	6	16	17	15	24	12	17	10	24	22	3
Silver	(Poland) (13) Jarosław Hampel	137	18	6	16	20	15	17	10	8	11	10	6
Bronze	(Australia) (1) Jason Crump	135	19	7	7	10	15	17	15	17	15	7	6
4	(Poland) (7) Rune Holta	109	10	6	7	6	19	8	20	6	6	9	12
5	(United States) (4) Greg Hancock	107	4	14	7	3	6	7	12	22	6	14	12
6	(United Kingdom) (14) Chris Harris	107	8	6	4	13	5	6	9	21	4	18	13
7	(Denmark) (8) Kenneth Bjerre	106	10	20	12	13	4	7	9	6	17	4	4
8	(Australia) (12) Chris Holder	96	8	11	7	9	6	19	6	7	10	7	6
9	(Sweden) (5) Andreas Jonsson	95	5	12	13	13	3	2	7	6	9	8	17
10	(Denmark) (6) Nicki Pedersen	91	9	8	14	5	8	7	0	4	12	11	13
11	(Sweden) (9) Fredrik Lindgren	87	8	4	7	8	6	10	11	11	5	6	11
12	(Denmark) (10) Hans N. Andersen	86	8	7	9	13	9	10	5	3	7	8	7
13	(Sweden) (11) Magnus Zetterström	74	4	9	11	7	6	6	3	6	8	7	7
14	(United Kingdom) (15) Tai Woffinden	49	1	4	5	5	7	6	3	6	2	6	4
15	(Russia) (3) Emil Sayfutdinov	33	14	8	5	–	–	–	6	–	–	–	–
16	(Poland) (16) Janusz Kołodziej	26	12	–	–	–	–	–	–	–	–	–	14
17	(Australia) (20) Davey Watt	19	–	–	–	–	–	6	–	6	1	6	–
18	(Poland) (19) Piotr Protasiewicz	13	–	–	–	0	5	–	–	–	–	–	8
19	(Sweden) (16) Thomas H. Jonasson	8	–	–	–	–	–	–	8	–	–	–	–
20	(Sweden) (16) Antonio Lindbäck	6	–	6	–	–	–	–	–	–	–	–	–
21	(Poland) (16) Adrian Miedziński	6	–	–	–	–	6	–	–	–	–	–	–
22	(Denmark) (16) Niels Kristian Iversen	6	–	–	–	–	–	–	–	–	6	–	–
23	(Croatia) (16) Jurica Pavlic	5	–	–	–	–	–	–	–	5	–	–	–
24	(United Kingdom) (16) Scott Nicholls	4	–	–	–	–	–	4	–	–	–	–	–
25	(Czech Republic) (16) Matěj Kůs	3	–	–	3	–	–	–	–	–	–	–	–
26	(Denmark) (16) Leon Madsen	3	–	–	–	3	–	–	–	–	–	–	–
27	(Sweden) (18) Ludvig Lindgren	2	–	–	–	–	–	–	2	–	–	–	–
28	(Italy) (16) Mattia Carpanese	1	–	–	–	–	–	–	–	–	–	1	–
29	(Denmark) (17) Nicolai Klindt	1	–	–	–	1	–	–	–	–	ns	–	–
30	(Poland) (17)(18) Artur Mroczka	1	–	–	–	–	0	–	–	–	–	–	1
31	(Sweden) (17) Linus Sundström	1	–	–	–	–	–	–	1	–	–	–	–
32	(Czech Republic) (17) Luboš Tomíček, Jr.	0	–	–	0	–	–	–	–	–	–	–	–
33	(Slovenia) (17) Matija Duh	0	–	–	–	–	–	–	–	0	–	–	–
34	(Poland) (17) Przemysław Pawlicki	0	–	–	–	–	–	–	–	–	–	–	0
35	(Czech Republic) (18) Zdeněk Simota	0	–	–	0	–	–	–	–	–	–	–	–
Rider(s) not classified
	(Poland) (17) Damian Baliński	—	ns	–	–	–	–	–	–	–	–	–	–
	(Sweden) (17) Simon Gustafsson	—	–	ns	–	–	–	–	–	–	–	–	–
	(United Kingdom) (17) Ben Barker	—	–	–	–	–	–	ns	–	–	–	–	–
	(Italy) (17) Mattia Cavicchioli	—	–	–	–	–	–	–	–	–	–	ns	–
	(Poland) (18) Maciej Janowski	—	ns	–	–	–	ns	–	–	–	–	–	–
	(Sweden) (18) Dennis Andersson	—	–	ns	–	–	–	–	–	–	–	–	–
	(Denmark) (18) Patrick Hougaard	—	–	–	–	ns	–	–	–	–	ns	–	–
	(United Kingdom) (18) Daniel King	—	–	–	–	–	–	ns	–	–	–	–	–
	(Hungary) (18) József Tabaka	—	–	–	–	–	–	–	–	ns	–	–	–
	(Italy) (18) Andrea Maida	—	–	–	–	–	–	–	–	–	–	ns	–
Pos.	Rider	Points	EUR (Poland)	SWE (Sweden)	CZE (Czech Republic)	DEN (Denmark)	POL (Poland)	GBR (United Kingdom)	SCA (Sweden)	CRO (Croatia)	NOR (Denmark)	ITA (Italy)	PL2 (Poland)

== See also ==
- motorcycle speedway
