= 2010 Speedway Grand Prix of Europe =

Annual round of the world motorcycle speedway championship

(Poland) 2010 Speedway Grand Prix of Europe
- 2010 FIM OtoMoto.pl European Speedway Grand Prix

Information
- Date: 24 April 2010
- City: (Poland) Leszno
- Event: 1 of 11 (123)
- Referee: (Sweden) Krister Gardell
- Jury President: (Germany) Wolfgang Glas

Stadium details
- Stadium: Alfred Smoczyk Stadium
- Length: 330 m (360 yd)

SGP Results
- Attendance: 16,000
- Best Time: (Poland) Jarosław Hampel; 60.07 secs (in Heat 1)
- (gold) Winner: (Australia) Jason Crump
- (silver) Runner-up: (Poland) Jarosław Hampel
- (bronze) 3rd place: (Russia) Emil Sayfutdinov

The 2010 FIM OtoMoto.pl European Speedway Grand Prix was the first race of the 2010 Speedway Grand Prix season. It took place on 24 April at the Alfred Smoczyk Stadium in Leszno, Poland.

The Grand Prix was won by defending world champion Jason Crump from Australia, who beat Pole Jarosław Hampel, Russian Emil Sayfutdinov and Polish wild card Janusz Kołodziej.

== Riders ==
The Speedway Grand Prix Commission nominated Janusz Kołodziej as Wild Card, and Damian Baliński and Maciej Janowski both as Track Reserves. Potential candidate for wild card was Australian Leigh Adams, who is riding for Unia Leszno since 1996, and who is an honorary citizen of Leszno. The Draw was made on 23 April at 13:00 CEST by President (=Mayor) of Leszno Tomasz Malepszy.

Three Poles, Hampel, Kołodziej and Baliński are all riding for Unia Leszno, whose home track is at the Alfred Smoczyk Stadium, in the 2010 season in Poland.

== Heat details ==
Placing	Draw	Rider	Total	1	2	3	4	5	6	7	8	9	10	11	12	13	14	15	16	17	18	19	20	Pts	Pos	21	22	23
1	15	(Australia) (1) Jason Crump	19				3			3			3						1	0				10	2		3	3
2	2	(Poland) (13) Jarosław Hampel	18	3					1				2				2				3			11	1	3		2
3	12	(Russia) (3) Emil Sayfutdinov	14			3					1		1			3						2		10	3		2	1
4	6	(Poland) (16) Janusz Kołodziej	12		1				3			3							2			1		10	4	2		X
5	3	(Denmark) (8) Kenneth Bjerre	10	1						2				2				2				3		10	5		0
6	8	(Poland) (7) Rune Holta	10		2						3			1			1			2				9	6	1
7	5	(Denmark) (6) Nicki Pedersen	9		3			2					0					0					3	8	8		1
8	1	(United Kingdom) (14) Chris Harris	8	2				3				0				0				3				8	7	0
9	9	(Sweden) (9) Fredrik Lindgren	8			1		1						3					3		0			8	9
10	16	(Denmark) (10) Hans N. Andersen	8				0				2	2						3			1			8	10
11	14	(Australia) (12) Chris Holder	8				2		2					0		2							2	8	11
12	10	(Poland) (2) Tomasz Gollob	6			2			0						2			1		1				6	12
13	7	(Sweden) (5) Andreas Jonsson	5		R4					1					1	1					2			5	13
14	4	(United States) (4) Greg Hancock	4	0							0				3				0				1	4	14
15	13	(Sweden) (11) Magnus Zetterström	4				1	0							0		3					0		4	15
16	11	(United Kingdom) (15) Tai Woffinden	1			0				0		1					0						0	1	16
17	17	(Poland) (17) Damian Baliński	-																					-	17
18	18	(Poland) (18) Maciej Janowski	-																					-	18
Placing	Draw	Rider	Total	1	2	3	4	5	6	7	8	9	10	11	12	13	14	15	16	17	18	19	20	Pts	Pos	21	22	23

e: retired or mechanical failure • m: exclusion for exceeding two minute time allowance • t: exclusion for touching the tapes • x: other exclusion • f: fell
ns: non-starter • nc: non-classify
Semi-finals: Heat 21: Riders placed 1st, 4th, 6th & 7th in the intermediate classification (after 20 heats)
Heat 22: Riders placed 2nd, 3rd, 5th & 8th in the intermediate classification (after 20 heats)
Big Final (heat 23): The first and second placed riders in each of the Semi-Finals

gate A – inside	gate B	gate C	gate D – outside

=== Heat after heat ===
1. Hampel, Harris, Bjerre, Hancock
2. Pedersen, Holta, Kołodziej, Jonsson (R4)
3. Sayfutdinov, Gollob, Lindgren, Woffinden
4. Crump, Holder, Zetterström, Andersen
5. Harris, Pedersen, Lindgren, Zetterström
6. Kołodziej, Holder, Hampel, Gollob
7. Crump, Bjerre, Jonsson, Woffinden
8. Holta, Andersen, Sayfutdinov, Hancock
9. Kołodziej, Andersen, Woffinden, Harris
10. Crump, Hampel, Sayfutdinov, Pedersen
11. Lindgren, Bjerre, Holta, Holder
12. Hancock, Gollob, Jonsson, Zetterström
13. Sayfutdinov, Holder, Jonsson, Harris
14. Zetterström, Hampel, Holta, Woffinden
15. Andersen, Bjerre, Gollob, Pedersen
16. Lindgren, Kołodziej, Crump, Hancock
17. Harris, Holta, Gollob, Crump
18. Hampel, Jonsson, Andersen, Lindgren
19. Bjerre, Sayfutdinov, Kołodziej, Zetterström
20. Pedersen, Holder, Hancock, Woffinden
  Semi-Finals:
21. Hampel, Kołodziej, Holta, Harris
22. Crump, Sayfutdinov, Pedersen, Bjerre
  The Final:
23. Crump, Hampel, Sayfutdinov, Kołodziej (X)

== The intermediate classification ==
Qualifies for next season's Grand Prix series
Full-time Grand Prix rider
Wild card, track reserve or qualified reserve

Pos.	Rider	Points	EUR (Poland)	SWE (Sweden)	CZE (Czech Republic)	DEN (Denmark)	POL (Poland)	GBR (United Kingdom)	SCA (Sweden)	CRO (Croatia)	NOR (Denmark)	ITA (Italy)	PL2 (Poland)
1	(Australia) (1) Jason Crump	19	19										
2	(Poland) (13) Jarosław Hampel	18	18										
3	(Russia) (3) Emil Sayfutdinov	14	14										
4	(Poland) (16) Janusz Kołodziej	12	12										
5	(Poland) (7) Rune Holta	10	10										
6	(Denmark) (8) Kenneth Bjerre	10	10										
7	(Denmark) (6) Nicki Pedersen	9	9										
8	(Sweden) (9) Fredrik Lindgren	8	8										
9	(Denmark) (10) Hans N. Andersen	8	8										
10	(Australia) (12) Chris Holder	8	8										
11	(United Kingdom) (14) Chris Harris	8	8										
12	(Poland) (2) Tomasz Gollob	6	6										
13	(Sweden) (5) Andreas Jonsson	5	5										
14	(United States) (4) Greg Hancock	4	4										
15	(Sweden) (11) Magnus Zetterström	4	4										
16	(United Kingdom) (15) Tai Woffinden	1	1										
Rider(s) not classified
	(Poland) (17) Damian Baliński	—	ns										
	(Poland) (18) Maciej Janowski	—	ns										
Pos.	Rider	Points	EUR (Poland)	SWE (Sweden)	CZE (Czech Republic)	DEN (Denmark)	POL (Poland)	GBR (United Kingdom)	SCA (Sweden)	CRO (Croatia)	NOR (Denmark)	ITA (Italy)	PL2 (Poland)

== See also ==
- Polski Związek Motorowy
- Unia Leszno
