= Damian Baliński Jr. =

Polish speedway rider

- Born: 14 May 1989 (age 37)
- Nationality: Poland

Career history
- 2005: Leszno (POL)
- 2007: Rawicz (POL)

Team honours
- 2007: Polish Second League winner

Damian Baliński, in Polish media known as Damian Baliński Jr. (born 14 May 1989) is a former speedway rider who rode for Unia Leszno in the Speedway Ekstraliga.

== Personal life ==
Baliński's father, Dariusz (born 1965), was also a speedway rider. Damian's uncle, also named Damian (born 1977), is the 2007 Speedway World Cup winner.

== Career history ==
Baliński passed speedway licence (Licencja "Ż") in 2005, as a 16-year-old. He rode for Unia Leszno in the 2005 Speedway Ekstraliga, scoring 0 points in 5 heats (2 matches). Unia Leszno finished fifth. Before the 2007 season, he was loaned to Kolejarz Rawicz and won the Second League, scoring for his team 42 points and 6 bonus points in 37 heats (10 matches) - average 1.297. In September 2007, he declared the end of his career.

== Career details ==
=== World Championships ===
- Individual Under-21 World Championship
  - 2007 – lost in the Domestic Qualification (14th place in the Final)

=== European Championships ===
- Individual Under-19 European Championship
  - 2007 – lost in the Domestic Qualification (17th place in the Final)

=== Polish Championships ===
- Polish Pairs Under-21 Championship
  - 2007 – 5th place in the Semi-Final Two (3 pts in 3 heats) for Rawicz
- Team Polish Championship
  - 2005 – 5th place in the Ekstraliga for Unia Leszno (Average 0.000)
  - 2007 – Second League winner for Kolejarz Rawicz (Average 1.297)

=== Others competitions ===
- Under-21 Silver Helmet
  - 2007 – (Poland) Rybnik – qualify to the Final as a track reserve, but windraw
- Under-19 Bronze Helmet
  - 2007 – nominated to the Semi-Final Two, but windraw

== See also ==
- Speedway in Poland
