= Matija Duh =

Slovenian speedway rider

- Born: 3 April 1989; Slovenia
- Died: 3 February 2013 (aged 23); Bahía Blanca, Argentina
- Nationality: Slovenia

Matija Duh (3 April 1989 – 3 February 2013) was a Slovenian international motorcycle speedway rider.

== Career ==
Duh raced in Poland for KSM Krosno, Orzeł Łódź, and Ostrovia Ostrów Wielkopolski. He also represented Slovenia on several occasions. Duh appeared in two Grand Prix - the Croatian events in 2010 and 2011, where he appeared as a reserve.

== Death ==
Duh suffered multiple injuries, including skull fractures, a brain haemorrhage, and a fractured hip, in a crash while racing in an Argentine Championship meeting at the Bahía Blanca track in Argentina on 30 January 2013, and died on 3 February, at age 23.

== See also ==
- Rider deaths in motorcycle speedway
