= Davey Watt =

Australian motorcycle racer (born 1978)

David Watt
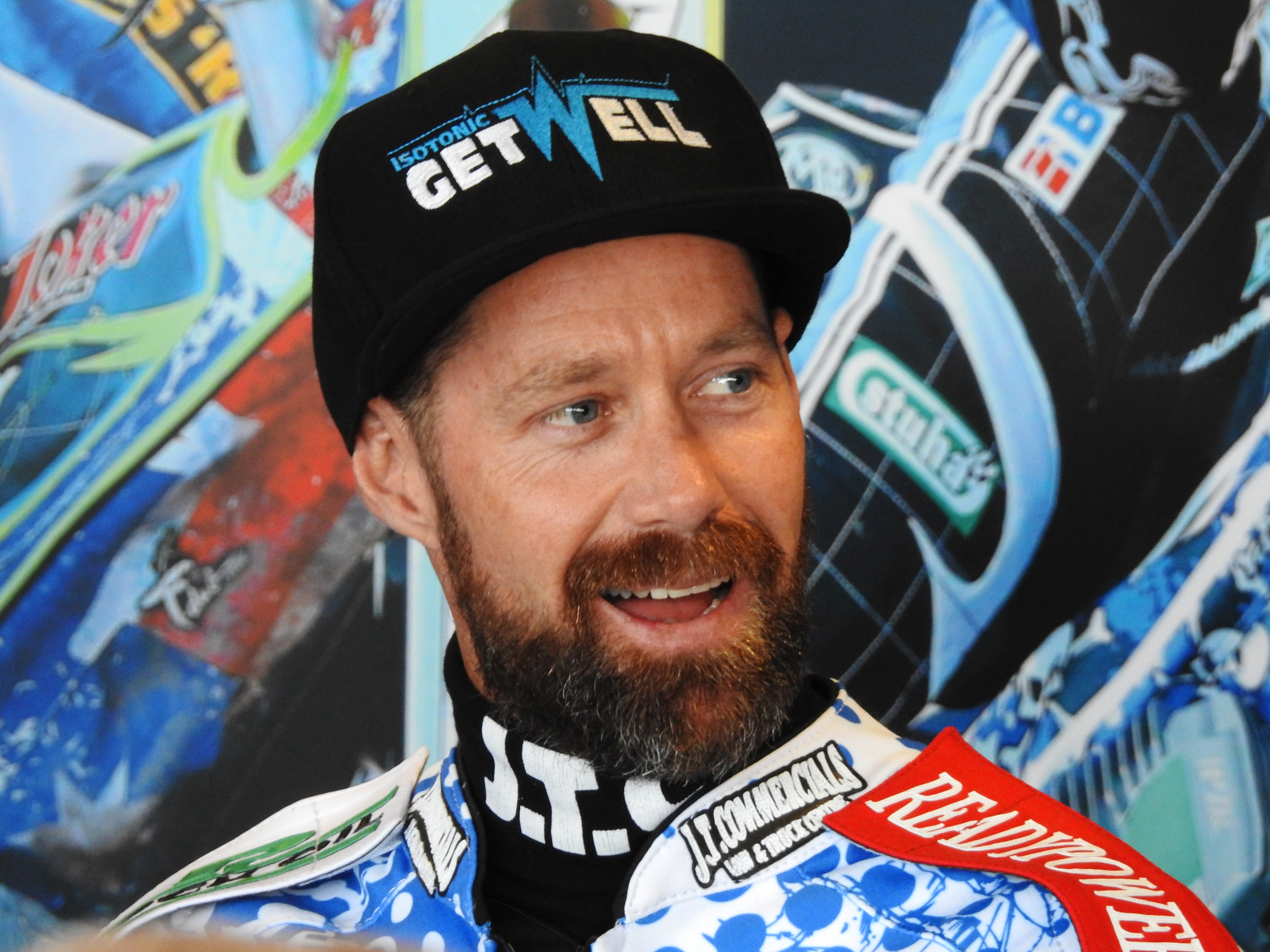
- Born: 6 January 1978 (age 48); Townsville, Queensland
- Nationality: Australian

Career history

Great Britain
- 2001: Isle of Wight Islanders
- 2002: Newcastle Diamonds
- 2003: King's Lynn Stars
- 2003–2004, 2008, 2010–2011, 2015–2016: Poole Pirates
- 2004, 2017: Rye House Rockets
- 2004–2005, 2007, 2009: Eastbourne Eagles
- 2006: Oxford Cheetahs
- 2012–2014: Lakeside Hammers
- 2016: Leicester Lions

Poland
- 2006, 2010–2012: Grudziądz
- 2007–2008, 2017: Rzeszów
- 2009: Wrocław
- 2013: Gniezno
- 2014: Lublin
- 2015: Kraków
- 2016: Daugavpils

Sweden
- 2004–2005, 2011: Valsarna
- 2006: Vargarna
- 2006–2008: Masarna
- 2009–2010: Lejonen
- 2012: Västervik

Denmark
- 2012: Grindsted

Individual honours
- 2004, 2006, 2008: Pride of the East winner
- 2005, 2017: Queensland State Champion
- 2012: Jack Young Solo Cup winner

Team honours
- 2003, 2004, 2008, 2011: Elite League Champion
- 2003: British League Cup Winner
- 2003: Craven Shield Winner

David John Watt (born 6 January 1978 in Townsville, Queensland) is a former international motorcycle speedway rider from Australia. He won the Queensland state championship in 2005 and was a member of the Australian team that finished second to Poland in the 2011 World Cup Final.

== Career summary ==
Watt started his British speedway career in 2001 when he signed for the Isle of Wight Islanders in the Premier League. He rode as a substitute reserve rider for the Oxford Cheetahs in 2001 and 2002 and was therefore a member of the Elite League title winning team in 2001. The following year, he signed for Premier League team Newcastle Diamonds. In 2002, he gained a team berth at King's Lynn Stars while also doubling up for his parent club the Poole Pirates, where he was part of the Pirates Elite League league winning team in 2003.

Watt rode for Rye House Rockets in the Premier League in 2004 and also doubled-up with Poole, but after he suffered an injury early on in the season he was replaced by Krzysztof Kasprzak. After Watt had recovered from his injury, he moved on loan to the Eastbourne Eagles in the Elite League, where he remained until 2006 when he moved to Oxford Cheetahs for a year. He returned to Eastbourne in 2007 and added 2 points to his average by the end of the season he was voted Eastbourne's Rider of the Year. He also finished fourth in the Elite League Riders Championship and won a bronze medal with Australia at the 2007 Speedway World Cup.

Watt looked set to stay with Eastbourne in 2008, but after a change of management at the club he was left without a team place. Watt returned to Poole in 2008 and won the Elite League championship.

Watt had ridden for Masarna Avesta in the Swedish Elitserien since 2006, but joined Lejonen in 2009 after Masarna were declared bankrupt and dropped out of the league. In Poland, he was a member of the GTŻ Grudziądz team in the Polish second division in 2006 before joining Polish Ekstraliga team Stal Rzeszów in 2007. Watt was made the captain of Stal Rzeszów for the 2008 season but the team were relegated. In 2009, Watt signed for WTS Wrocław in the Ekstraliga.

In April 2017, after being dropped by SGB Premiership team Rye House Rockets, Watt announced his retirement from racing, although he stated that he would fulfil his obligations to Polish team Stal Rzeszów if required.

== World final appearances ==
=== Speedway World Cup ===
- 2007 - (Poland) Leszno, Alfred Smoczyk Stadium - 3rd - 29pts
- 2008 - (Denmark) Vojens, Vojens Speedway Center - 4th - 21pts (3)
- 2009 - (Poland) Leszno, Alfred Smoczyk Stadium - 2nd - 43pts (5)
- 2011 - (Poland) Gorzów Wielkopolski, Edward Jancarz Stadium - 2nd - 45pts (3)
- 2012 - (Sweden) Målilla, G&B Stadium - 2nd - 39pts (16)

== Speedway Grand Prix results ==
Year	Position	Points	Best finish	Notes
2010	17th	19	11th	
