= Zdeněk Simota =

Czech speedway rider

- Born: 4 May 1985 (age 41); Prachatice, Czech Republic
- Nickname: Sam Simota
- Nationality: Czech

Career history

Czech Republic
- ?: PK Plzeň

Great Britain
- 2005–2007: Reading
- 2008: Peterborough
- 2014–2016: Plymouth

Poland
- 2007–2009: Łódź
- 2011: Krosno

Denmark
- 2009–2010: Brovst

Zdeněk Simota (born 4 May 1985 in Prachatice, Czech Republic) also known as Sam Simota, is a former motorcycle speedway rider from the Czech Republic. He earned 5 international caps for the Czech Republic national speedway team.

== Career ==
Simota began riding at the age of nine. The highlights of his career were becoming the Czech Under-21 Champion in 2004 and reaching the semi-final of the European Championships. He has been a meeting reserve in the Czech 2006 Speedway Grand Prix.

In 2005, Simota was introduced into the British Premier League for the Reading Racers as an injury replacement for Danny Bird. In 2007, he rode for the Racers in the Elite League.

During a race meet in Hungary in May 2008, Simota suffered serious injuries which ended his season. By 2009, he was back in training and rode for the Czech team AK Plzeň, the Polish team Orzel Lodz, and the Danish team Brovst.

Simota returned to Britain in 2014 and spent three seasons with Plymouth Devils from 2014 until 2016.
