= Damian Baliński =

Polish speedway rider

- Born: 5 August 1977 (age 49); Poland
- Nationality: Polish

Career history

Poland
- 1994-2014: Leszno
- 2015-2017: Rybnik
- 2018-2023: Rawicz

Sweden
- 2003–2004, 2007: Piraterna
- 2012: Indianerna

Great Britain
- 2007: Swindon Robins

Denmark
- 2002: Vojens
- 2004, 2008, 2010–2013, 2015: Holsted

Individual honours
- 2008: Polish Golden Helmet Winner

Team honours
- 2007: Team World Champion
- 2007: Team Polish Champion
- 2003: Allsvenskan Champion

Damian Baliński (born 5 August 1977, in Poland) is a motorcycle speedway rider from Poland. He earned two international caps for the Poland speedway team.

== Career ==
Baliński was a member of the Poland national speedway team. Remarkably, in 29 seasons of Polish speedway, he has only ridden for three clubs Unia Leszno, Rybnik and Rawicz.

Baliński only rode one season in the British leagues, with Swindon Robins in 2007.

== Family ==
Baliński's older brother Dariusz and his son Damian Jr. (Damian's nephew; b. 1989) are also speedway riders. Baliński is married to Aneta. They have two sons, Mikołaj and Filip (b. 2009).

== Speedway Grand Prix results ==
2008 SGP
| | Grand Prix | Pos. | Pts. | Heats | Draw |
|---|---|---|---|---|---|
| — | (Poland) Leszno | 17 | | | 17 |

2009 SGP
| | Grand Prix | Pos. | Pts. | Heats | Draw |
|---|---|---|---|---|---|
| — | (Poland) Leszno | 17 | | | 17 |

2010 SGP
| | Grand Prix | Pos. | Pts. | Heats | Draw |
|---|---|---|---|---|---|
| — | (Poland) Leszno | 17 | | | 17 |

| permanent speedway rider |
| wild card, track reserve or qualified reserve |
| rider not classified (track reserve who did not start) |

== Career details ==
=== World Championship ===
- Individual World Championship (Speedway Grand Prix)
  - 2008 - not classify (0 heats at European SGP)
- Individual Under-21 World Championship
  - 1996 - (Germany) Olching - track reserve
  - 1998 - (Poland) Piła - 8th place (7 points)
- Team World Championship (Speedway World Cup)
  - 2007 (Poland) Leszno - World Champion

=== European Championships ===
- Individual European Championship
  - 2005 - (Italy) Lonigo - 5th place (10 points)
  - 2006 - (Hungary) Miskolc - 7th place (8 points)
- European Pairs Championship
  - 2006 - started in Semi-Final 2 only (6 points)

=== Polish Championships ===
- Individual Polish Championship
  - 2007 - Bronze medal
  - 2008 - (Poland) Leszno - 5th place (9 points)
- Individual Under-21 Polish Championship
  - 1996 - Bronze medal
- Polish Pairs Championship
  - 1999 - Silver medal
  - 2003 - Polish Champion
  - 2007 - Bronze medal
- Polish Pairs Under-21 Championship
    - 1996 - Polish Champion
  - 1997 - Polish Champion
- Team Polish Championship
  - 2002 - Silver medal
  - 2007 - Polish Champion
- Team Under-21 Team Championship
  - 1996 - Bronze medal
  - 1997 - Bronze medal

=== Others competitions ===
- Golden Helmet
  - 2005 - Runner-up
  - 2008 - (Poland) Wrocław - Winner
- Under-19 Bronze Helmet
  - 1996 - Gold medal
- Team Speedway Polish Cup
  - 1997 - Silver medal
  - 1998 - Silver medal
- Mieczysław Połukard Criterium of Polish Speedway Leagues Aces
  - 2008 - (Poland) Bydgoszcz - 7th place (8 points)

== See also ==
- Poland national speedway team
- List of Speedway Grand Prix riders
