= Jarosław Hampel =

Polish speedway rider

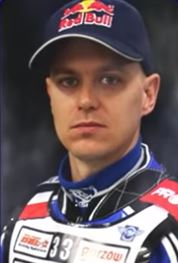
- Hampel in 2014
- Born: 17 April 1982 (age 44); Łódź, Poland
- Website: Official website

Career history

Poland
- 2001–2002: Piła
- 2003–2006: Wrocław
- 2007–2012, 2018–2019: Leszno
- 2013–2017, 2024–2025: Zielona Góra
- 2020–2023: Lublin

Sweden
- 2000, 2002–2005: Kaparna
- 2006–2015, 2017–2020: Vetlanda
- 2021–2025: Lejonen

Great Britain
- 2000–2003, 2008–2009: Ipswich Witches

Denmark
- 2004: Outrup

Speedway Grand Prix statistics
- SGP number: 33
- Starts: 96
- Finalist: 32 times
- Winner: 6 times

Individual honours
- 2010, 2013: World Championship runner-up
- 2011: Polish Champion

Team honours
- 2005, 2007, 2009, 2010, 2011, 2013: Speedway World Cup
- 2023: European Team champion
- 2022, 2023: Polish Champions
- 2003, 2024: Swedish Elitserien Champion

Jarosław "Jarek" Hampel (pronounced [ˈjarɔswaf ˈxampɛl]; born 17 April 1982 in Łódź, Poland) is a former motorcycle speedway rider from Poland. He is a six times World Cup winner and earned 24 caps for the Poland national speedway team.

== Career ==
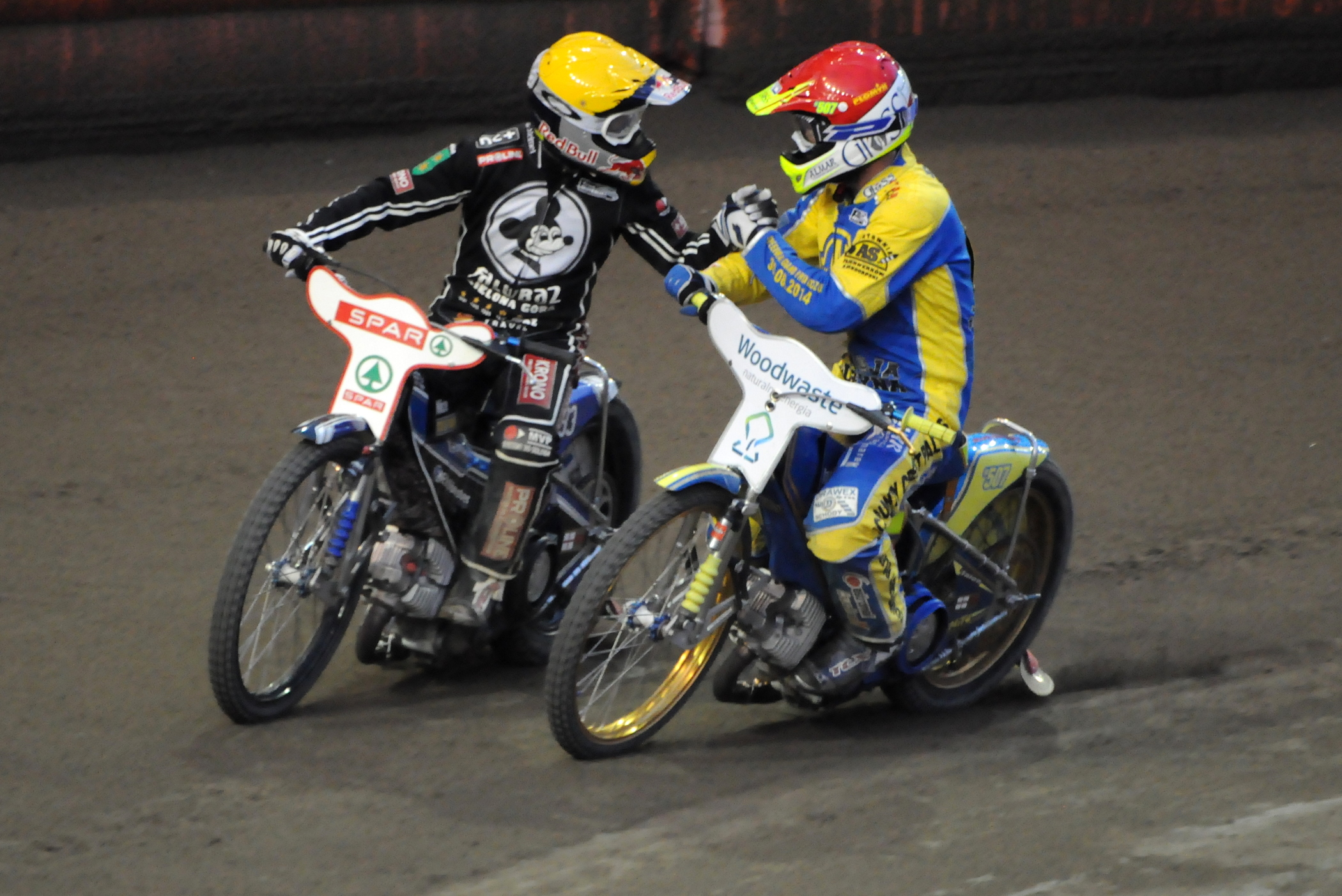
Hampel (left) in Zielona Góra colours (2014)

Hampel received his speedway license in 1998 with the Polish team Polonia Piła, although he first started racing on a mini-track in Pawłowice, close to the city of Leszno.

In 1999, Hampel won a bronze medal at the Individual U-19 European Championship as well as a bronze medal at the Individual U-21 World Championship in 2000 and a gold medal in 2003.

Hampel started in the Speedway Grand Prix in 2000, and became a regular starter from 2004. In 2005, he won the Speedway World Cup with Poland, together with Tomasz Gollob, Piotr Protasiewicz, Grzegorz Walasek and Rune Holta; beating Sweden, Denmark and Great Britain in the final held at the Olympic Stadium in Wrocław, Poland. He has since won the world cup a further three times in 2007, 2009 and 2010 taking his number of world cup gold medals to four. In 2000, he began his British leagues career when he joined Ipswich Witches and rode for them until mid-way through the 2009 season.

Hampel won two silver medals at the Individual Polish Championships in 2000 and 2004, as well as three medals at the Junior Individual Polish Championships (Gold in 2001, Silver in 2002, Bronze in 2000).

In 2010 and 2013, Hampel became the World Championship runner-up, winning silver medals in the Speedway World Championships (Grand Prix Series), and in 2011, he won the bronze medal. He became the Polish Champion in 2011, after winning the Polish Individual Speedway Championship. He later won six Speedway World Cups with Poland during an eight-year period. The wins came in 2005, 2007, 2009, 2010, 2011 and 2013.

In 2022, Hampel helped Lublin win the 2022 Ekstraliga.

In 2023, Hampel was a member of the Polish team that won the European Team Speedway Championship. In 2024, he helped Lejonen win the Elitserien during the 2024 Swedish speedway season.

Hampel announced his retirement form speedway during September 2025.

== Awards ==
For his sport achievements, he received:
Bronze Cross of Merit in 2005;
Golden Cross of Merit in 2007.

== Speedway Grand Prix results ==
Year	Position	Points	Best Finish	Notes
2000	27th	7	12th	Wild Card Entry - European Grand Prix - Debut
2001	25th	7	11th	Wild Card Entry - Polish Grand Prix
2002	30th	6	17th	Wild Card Entries - Polish and European Grand Prix
2003	25th	13	6th	Wild Card Entry - Polish Grand Prix
2004	8th	81	2nd	First full Speedway Grand Prix season and placed second in Czech Republic Grand Prix
2005	11th	67	2nd	Second in British Grand Prix
2006	9th	91	3rd	Third in British Grand Prix
2007	13th	67	2nd	Second in Czech Republic Grand Prix
2008	16th	16	4th	Wild Card Entry - European Grand Prix
2009	18th	9	5th	Wild Card Entry - European Grand Prix
2010	2nd	137	Winner	Won Denmark Grand Prix - First Grand Prix win
2011	3rd	123	Winner	Won Scandinavian Grand Prix
2012	14th	58	2nd	Broke right fibula Denmark GP - Missed next four Grand Prix
2013	2nd	142	Winner	Won New Zealand, Poland and Slovenian Grand Prix
2014	8th	98	Winner	Won Scandinavian Grand Prix
2015	16th	31	2nd	Injured while 3rd in standings after three Grand Prix - Missed remainder of season
