= Magnus Zetterström =

Swedish speedway rider

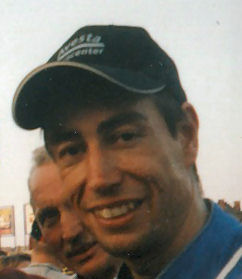
- Born: 9 December 1971 (age 54); Eskilstuna, Sweden
- Nickname: Zorro
- Nationality: Swedish

Career history

Sweden
- 1989-1990: Eskilstuna/Karlstad
- 1991: Vargarna
- 1992-2001, 2009, 2011, 2013-2016: Smederna
- 1993: Gesällerna
- 2001-2002: Örnarna
- 2003: Masarna
- 2004: Västervik
- 2005-2010: Indianerna
- 2011-2012: Hammarby

Great Britain
- 1996, 1998–1999, 2001, 2003–2004, 2008: Poole Pirates
- 2000, 2002: Peterborough Panthers
- 2005–2007: Somerset Rebels
- 2013: Belle Vue Aces

Poland
- 1999, 2002: Lublin
- 2000: Rybnik
- 2003-2004, 2007: Gorzów
- 2005: Grudziądz
- 2006: Gniezno
- 2008–2011, 2015–2016: Gdańsk
- 2013–2014: Łódź

Denmark
- 2011–2013: Fjelsted
- 2016: Holsted

Individual honours
- 2002: European Champion
- 2009: GP Challenge winner
- 2008: Swedish Champion
- 2006: Premier League Riders Champion

Team honours
- 2003: British League Cup Winner
- 2004, 2008: Elite League Champion
- 2004: Elite League KO Cup
- 2005: Premier League Fours Champion
- 2003: Polish Div 3 Champion
- 1992, 2001: Allsvenskan Winner
- 1994: Norwegian League Champion

Hans Magnus Zetterström (born 9 December 1971 in Eskilstuna, Sweden) is a former international motorcycle speedway rider from Sweden. He earned three caps for the Sweden national speedway team.

== Career ==
Zetterström's first season in the British leagues was in 1996, when he joined the Poole Pirates for the 1996 Premier League speedway season. He returned to Poole in 1998, where he would spend seven seasons in total, split by spells at Peterborough Panthers. He would also make his Polish league debut in 1999 for Lublin.

Zetterström became European Champion in 2002.

In 2005, Zetterström joined the Somerset Rebels and went on to win the Premier League Riders' Championship, held on 24 September 2006 at Owlerton Stadium. He was also part of the Somerset four who won the Premier League Four-Team Championship, held on 20 August 2005, at Derwent Park.

In 2008, Zetterström became the Swedish Champion.

In September 2009, during the Speedway Grand Prix Qualification, Zetterström won the GP Challenge, which ensured that he claimed a permanent slot for the 2010 Grand Prix.

Zetterström returned for one final season in the British leagues in 2013 when riding for the Belle Vue Aces. However, he continued to ride in his native Sweden with Smederna in 2015 and in Poland until the end of the 2016 season.

== Individual European Championship appearances ==
- 2002 - European Champion (12 points +3)
- 2003 - 3rd place (11 points)
