= Rune Holta =

Norwegian speedway rider

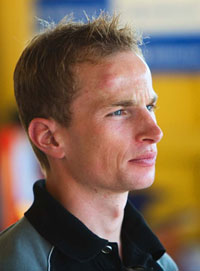
- Born: 29 August 1973 (age 53); Stavanger, Norway
- Nationality: Norwegian & Polish

Career history

Norway
- 1991–2001: NMK Sandnes & Jæren

Poland
- 1994: Grudziądz
- 1996, 2012: Zielona Góra
- 1997–1998, 2007: Tarnów
- 1999–2000, 2002–2005, 2010, 2013–2014, 2017, 2020: Częstochowa
- 2006: Rzeszów
- 2008–2009: Gorzów
- 2011, 2018–2019: Toruń
- 2015: Ostrów
- 2016, 2021: Rybnik
- 2022: Poznań
- 2023: Łódź

Denmark
- 1997–2004, 2013: Outrup
- 2008: Grindsted

Sweden
- 1995–2002: Valsarna
- 2003–2008, 2015, 2021: Vetlanda
- 2009, 2012–2013: Indianerna
- 2010–2011, 2016: Dackarna
- 2014: Västervik

Germany
- 2016–2019: Brokstedt

Speedway Grand Prix statistics
- SGP number: 7
- Starts: 74
- Podiums: 5 (2–1–2)
- Finalist: 8 times
- Winner: 2 times

Individual honours
- 1994, 1996, 1997, 2000: Norwegian Champion
- 2003, 2007: Polish Champion
- 1999, 2000: Nordic Champion
- 2009, 2011: Golden Helmet of Pardubice
- 2008: Swedish Grand Prix
- 2010: Scandinavian Grand Prix

Team honours
- 2005, 2007, 2010: World Cup Winner
- 2003: Polish Team Champion
- 2007: Polish Pairs Champion
- 1998, 1999, 2004, 2006, 2015: Swedish Elitserien Champion
- 1999, 2001: Danish League Champion
- 1999: Polish Div Two Champion

Rune Holta (born 29 August 1973 in Stavanger, Norway) is a speedway rider. He grew up in Randaberg Municipality, Norway, but has been a Polish citizen since 2002.

== Career ==
In 1994, Holta finished runner-up to Mikael Karlsson in the final of the 1994 Speedway Under-21 World Championship following a run-off for the title. This was the same year that Holta won the first of his four Norwegian Individual Speedway Championships.

In 2002, Holta took Polish citizenship, allowing him to represent Poland in international competitions and was a member of their Speedway World Cup winning teams in 2005, 2007 and 2010. He has also won the Polish Championship in 2003 and 2007.

In 2020, Holta rode for Dackarna Malilla in the Swedish Elit League and for Włókniarz Częstochowa in the Polish Ekstraliga. In 2022, he helped PSŻ Poznań win the 2022 2.Liga.

== Awards ==
For his sport achievements, Holta received:
Golden Cross of Merit in 2007.

== Plane crash ==
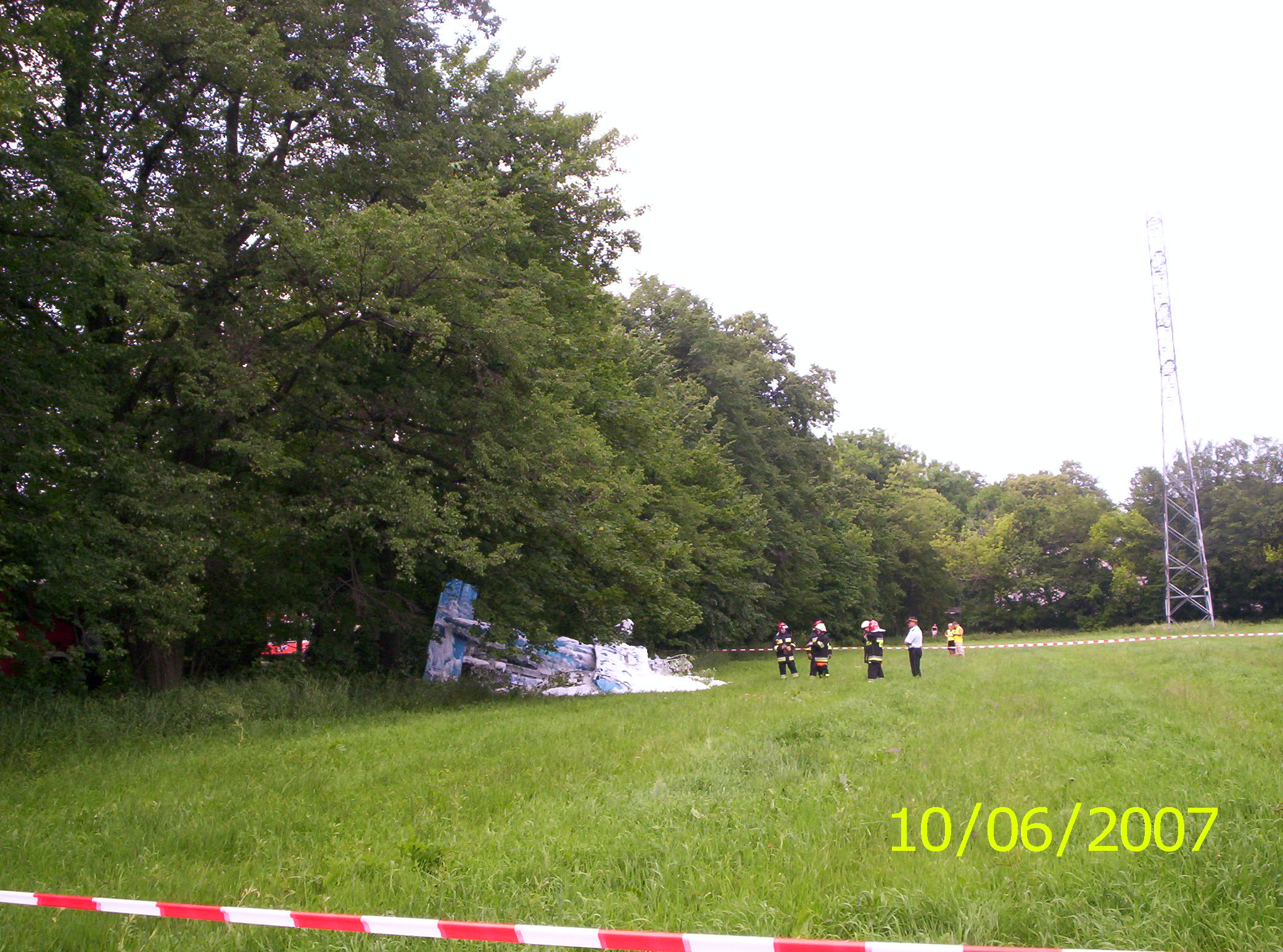
Place of 2007 plane crash.

In 2007, Holta survived a plane crash with fellow rider Tomasz Gollob. The plane, flown by Władysław Gollob, crashed on the way to a meeting at Tarnów. Holta escaped with cuts and bruises.

On his official website, Holta stated "In spite of the circumstance I'm doing OK but I'm very shaken. We have been very lucky, and I'm just glad that I'm still alive."

== Major results ==
=== Speedway Grand Prix ===
Year	Position	Points	Best Finish	Notes
2000	26th	8	9th	1 wild card ride
2001	14th	41	5th	
2002	11th	80	4th	
2003	8th	98	4th	
2004	14th	60	4th	
2005	20th	6		1 wild card ride
2006	–	–	–	Did not participate
2007	7th	91	3rd	

2007 Speedway Grand Prix Final Championship standings (Riding No 14)
Race no.	Grand Prix	Pos.	Pts.	Heats	Draw No
1 /11	(Italy) Italian SGP	15	2	(X,0,X,2,0)	4
2 /11	(Europe) European SGP	11	6	(1,F,2,3,X)	6
3 /11	(Sweden) Swedish SGP	6	9	(3,1,1,1,3) +0	1
4 /11	(Denmark) Danish SGP	12	5	(0,2,3,F,0)	4
5 /11	(United Kingdom) British SGP	11	5	(3,1,E,1,0)	7
6 /11	(Czech Republic) Czech Rep. SGP	3	16	(1,2,3,2,3) +3 +1	11
7 /11	(Sweden) Scandinavian SGP	11	5	(0,0,1,1,3)	10
8 /11	(Latvia) Latvian SGP	10	7	(1,1,2,3,0)	16
9 /11	(Poland) Polish SGP	6	10	(0,3,2,2,3) +0	11
10 /11	(Slovenia) Slovenian SGP	3	17	(2,3,3,3,2) +2 +1	13
11 /11	(Germany) German SGP	6	10	(1,2,3,1,2) +1	15

1

2008 Speedway Grand Prix Final Championship standings (Riding No 7)
Race no.	Grand Prix	Pos.	Pts.	Heats	Draw No
1 /11	(Slovenia) Slovenian SGP	13	5	(3,1,0,1,0)	1
2 /11	(Europe) European SGP				
3 /11	(Sweden) Swedish SGP				
4 /11	(Denmark) Danish SGP				
5 /11	(United Kingdom) British SGP				
6 /11	(Czech Republic) Czech Rep. SGP				
7 /11	(Sweden) Scandinavian SGP				
8 /11	(Latvia) Latvian SGP				
9 /11	(Poland) Polish SGP				
10 /11	(Italy) Italian SGP				
11 /11	(Germany) German SGP				

permanent speedway rider
wild card, track reserve or qualified reserve
rider not classified (track reserve who did not start)

== See also ==
- List of Speedway Grand Prix riders
- Norway national speedway team
- Poland national speedway team
