= 1992 Polish speedway season =

Motorcycle racing competition

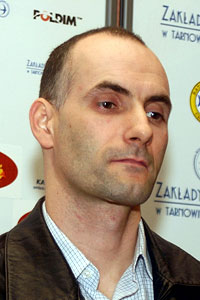
- Tomasz Gollob won the Individual and team championships with Polonia Bydgoszcz, in addition to winning the Golden Helmet

The 1992 Polish Speedway season was the 1992 season of motorcycle speedway in Poland.

== Individual ==
=== Polish Individual Speedway Championship ===
The 1992 Individual Speedway Polish Championship final was held on 6 September at Zielona Góra. Tomasz Gollob won the Polish Championship for the first time.

Pos.	Rider	Club	Total	Points
1	Tomasz Gollob	Bydgoszcz	14	(3,3,2,3,3)
2	Jarosław Szymkowiak	Zielona Góra	13	(3,3,3,2,2)
3	Robert Sawina	Toruń	12	(3,1,2,3,3)
4	Jan Krzystyniak	Rzeszów	11	(0,3,3,3,2)
5	Mirosław Kowalik	Toruń	11	(2,3,3,1,2)
6	Piotr Baron	Wrocław	10	(2,2,1,2,3)
7	Sławomir Dudek	Zielona Góra	8	(3,u,0,2,3)
8	Piotr Świst	Gorzów Wlkp	7	(0,1,3,3,0)
9	Janusz Stachyra	Rzeszów	6	(1,2,2,1,0)
10	Dariusz Śledź	Wrocław	5	(0,2,1,0,2)
11	Andrzej Zarzecki	Zielona Góra	5	(2,w,0,2,1)
12	Jacek Krzyżaniak	Toruń	5	(1,0,2,1,1)
13	Jerzy Mordel	Lublin	4	(1,2,0,0,1)
14	Piotr Leśniowski	Tarnów	4	(2,0,1,0,1)
15	Maciej Jaworek	Zielona Góra	3	(1,1,1,0,u)
16	Jarosław Olszewski	Gdańsk	2	(t,1,0,1,0)
17	Marek Kępa (res)	Lublin	0	(0)
18	Jacek Rempała (res)	Tarnów	0	(0)

=== Golden Helmet ===
The 1992 Golden Golden Helmet (Polish: Turniej o Złoty Kask, ZK) organised by the Polish Motor Union (PZM) was the 1992 event for the league's leading riders. The final was held at Wrocław on the 15 October. Tomasz Gollob won the Golden Helmet for the first time and therefore completing the Polish Championship and Golden Helmet double.

Pos.	Rider	Club	Total	Points
1	Tomasz Gollob	Bydgoszcz	15	(3,3,3,3,3)
2	Roman Jankowski	Leszno	12	(2,2,3,2,3)
3	Krzysztof Kuczwalski	Toruń	11	(3,2,2,2,2)
4	Andrzej Huszcza	Zielona Góra	10	(1,3,1,2,3)
5	Wojciech Załuski	Wrocław	10	(3,1,1,3,2)
6	Piotr Świst	Gorzów Wlkp.	8	(0,1,3,3,1)
7	Eugeniusz Skupień	Rybnik	8	(1,3,2,1,1)
8	Sławomir Dudek	Zielona Góra	8	(2,1,2,1,2)
9	Jacek Krzyżaniak	Toruń	7	(1,3,3,d,d)
10	Jerzy Mordel	Lublin	7	(w,0,1,3,3)
11	Zenon Kasprzak	Leszno	6	(3,0,1,1,1)
12	Piotr Baron (żużlowiec)	Wrocław	6	(1,2,2,1,u)
13	Paweł Jachym	Machowa	4	(2,0,0,0,2)
14	Dariusz Stenka	Lublin	4	(2,2,0,0,d)
15	Grzegorz Rempała	Machowa	4	(t,1,0,2,1)
16	Jacek Woźniak	Bydgoszcz	0	(0,0,d,0,0)
17	Marek Mróz (res)	Opole	0	(0)
18	Jacek Gollob (res)	Bydgoszcz	ns	

=== Junior Championship ===
- winner - Tomasz Gollob

=== Silver Helmet ===
- winner - Tomasz Gollob

=== Bronze Helmet ===
- winner - Maciej Bargiel

== Pairs ==
=== Polish Pairs Speedway Championship ===
The 1992 Polish Pairs Speedway Championship was the 19 edition of the Polish Pairs Speedway Championship. The final was held on 1992 May at Gorzów Wielkopolski.

Pos	Team	Pts	Riders
1	Stal Gorzów Wlkp.	27	Piotr Świst 16, Ryszard Franczyszyn 8, Piotr Paluch 3
2	Polonia Bydgoszcz	26	Tomasz Gollob 14, Jacek Gollob 12, Jacek Woźniak 0
3	Apator Toruń	22	Jacek Krzyżaniak 11, Mirosław Kowalik 11,
4	Unia Leszno	19	Roman Jankowski 10, Piotr Pawlicki Sr. 9, Zenon Kasprzak 0
5	Polonia Piła	16	Krzysztof Okupski 9, Mirosław Daniszewski 1, Andrzej Rzepka 6
6	KKŻ Krosno	8	Bogdan Ciupak 5, Jerzy Głogowski 0, Andrzej Surowiec 3
7	Victoria Rolnicki Machowa	7	Piotr Styczyński 1, Grzegorz Rempała 5, Paweł Jachym 1

== Team ==
=== Team Speedway Polish Championship ===
The 1992 Team Speedway Polish Championship was the 1992 edition of the Team Polish Championship. Polonia Bydgoszcz won the gold medal.

==== First Division ====
Pos	Team	Pts	W	D	L	Diff
1	Polonia Bydgoszcz	30	15	0	3	+349
2	Stal Gorzów Wielkopolski	27	13	1	4	+273
3	Apator Toruń	25	12	1	5	+165
4	ZKŻ Zielona Góra	21	10	1	7	+133
5	Motor Lublin	20	9	2	7	–29
6	Unia Tarnów	19	9	1	8	–93
7	Sparta Wrocław	16	8	0	10	–24
8	Stal Rzeszów	12	6	0	12	–62
9	Wybrzeże Gdańsk	8	4	0	14	–299
10	Włókniarz Częstochowa	2	1	0	17	–413

==== Second Division ====
Pos	Team	Pts	W	D	L	Diff
1	ROW Rybnik	37	18	1	1	+413
2	Unia Leszno	36	18	0	2	+513
3	Start Gniezno	30	15	0	5	+318
4	Polonia Piła	22	10	2	8	+53
5	Kolejarz Opole	19	9	1	10	–59
6	KKŻ Krosno	18	9	0	11	+1
7	Victoria Rolnicki Machowa	15	7	1	12	–95
8	GKM Grudziądz	14	7	0	13	–173
9	Ostrów Wielkopolski	12	5	2	13	–281
10	Sparta Wrocław II	11	5	1	14	–296
11	Śląsk Świętochłowice	6	3	0	17	–400
