= 1988 Polish speedway season =

Motorcycle racing competition

The 1988 Polish Speedway season was the 1988 season of motorcycle speedway in Poland.

== Individual ==
=== Polish Individual Speedway Championship ===
The 1988 Individual Speedway Polish Championship final was held over 2 days on 24 and 25 August at Leszno.

Pos.	Rider	Club	Total	Points
1	Roman Jankowski	Leszno	25 +3	(11,14)
2	Jan Krzystyniak	Leszno	25 +2	(11,14)
3	Zenon Kasprzak	Leszno	24	(14,10)
4	Janusz Stachyra	Rzeszów	20	(13,7)
5	Antoni Skupień	Rybnik	17	(8, 9)
6	Andrzej Huszcza	Zielona Góra	16	(9, 7)
7	Dariusz Baliński	Leszno	16	(10,6)
8	Piotr Świst	Gorzów Wlkp.	16	(7, 9)
9	Mirosław Korbel	Rybnik	15	(9, 6)
10	Cezary Owiżyc	Gorzów Wlkp.	15	(8, 7)
11	Wojciech Żabiałowicz	Toruń	14	(7, 7)
12	Zdzisław Rutecki	Bydgoszcz	13	(5, 8)
13	Sławomir Dudek	Zielona Góra	10	(4, 6)
14	Adam Pawliczek	Rybnik	5	(1, 4)
15	Bronisław Klimowicz	Rybnik	5	(3, 2)
16	Krzysztof Kuczwalski	Toruń	4	(0, 4)

=== Golden Helmet ===
The 1988 Golden Golden Helmet (Polish: Turniej o Złoty Kask, ZK) organised by the Polish Motor Union (PZM) was the 1988 event for the league's leading riders. The final was held over four rounds.

Pos.	Rider	Club	Total	Points
1	Piotr Świst	Gorzów Wlkp.	48+3	(11,13,11,13)
2	Jan Krzystyniak	Leszno	48+2	(10,14,10,14)
3	Zenon Kasprzak	Leszno	44	(10,13,9,12)
4	Andrzej Huszcza	Zielona Góra	42	(15,10,3,14)
5	Antoni Skupień	Rybnik	41	(10,10,11,10)
6	Dariusz Stenka	Gdańsk	36	(7,10,13,6)
7	Jarosław Olszewski	Gdańsk	35	(11,7,9,8)
8	Janusz Stachyra	Rzeszów	27	(-,9,9,9)
9	Adam Pawliczek	Rybnik	25	(7,7,8,3)
10	Krzysztof Zarzecki	Świętochłowice	22	(7,2,6,7)
11	Janusz Kapustka	Tarnów	20	(4,4,7,5)
12	Wojciech Żabiałowicz	Toruń	16	(10,5,1,-)
13	Sławomir Drabik	Częstochowa	13	(3,-,8,2)
14	Grzegorz Dzikowski	Gdańsk	13	(3,6,-,4)
15	Bronisław Klimowicz	Rybnik	11	(2,4,5,-)
16	Grzegorz Kuźniar	Rzeszów	10	(4,6,-,-)
17	Jerzy Głogowski	Lublin	7	(-,-,4,3)
18	Bogdan Ciupak	Rzeszów	5	(4,0,-,1)
19	Krzysztof Okupski	Gorzów Wlkp.	4	(-,-,4,-)
20	Eugeniusz Miastkowski	Toruń	1	(1,-,-,-)
21	Eugeniusz Błaszak	Tarnów	1	(1,-,-,-)

=== Junior Championship ===
- winner - Piotr Świst

=== Silver Helmet ===
- winner - Jarosław Olszewski

=== Bronze Helmet ===
- winner - Jarosław Olszewski

== Pairs ==
=== Polish Pairs Speedway Championship ===
The 1988 Polish Pairs Speedway Championship was the 1988 edition of the Polish Pairs Speedway Championship. The final was held on 4 May at Rybnik.

Pos	Team	Pts	Riders
1	Unia Leszno	50	Roman Jankowski 24, Jan Krzystyniak 21, Dariusz Baliński 5
2	ROW Rybnik	36	Mirosław Korbel 21, Eugeniusz Skupień 15
3	Stal Gorzów Wlkp.	35	Piotr Świst 20, Ryszard Franczyszyn 14, Krzysztof Okupski 1
4	Wybrzeże Gdańsk	30	Dariusz Stenka 21, Grzegorz Dzikowski 9, Mirosław Berliński 0
5	Unia Tarnów	27	Bogusław Nowak 3, Janusz Kapustka 13, Eugeniusz Błaszak 11
6	Polonia Bydgoszcz	26	Ryszard Dołomisiewicz 11, Zdzisław Rutecki 13, Waldemar Cieślewicz 2
7	Falubaz Zielona Góra	26	Andrzej Huszcza 16, Zbigniew Błażejczak 1, Sławomir Dudek 9
8	Apator Toruń	28	Wojciech Żabiałowicz 23, Eugeniusz Miastkowski 3, Krzysztof Kuczwalski 2
9	Stal Rzeszów	10	Krzysztof Nurzyński 10, Bogdan Ciupak 0, Kazimierz Dziura 0

== Team ==
=== Team Speedway Polish Championship ===
The 1988 Team Speedway Polish Championship was the 1988 edition of the Team Polish Championship.

Unia Leszno won the gold medal for the second consecutive season. The team included Roman Jankowski, Zenon Kasprzak, Piotr Pawlicki Sr. and Jan Krzystyniak.

=== First League ===
Pos	Club	Pts	W	D	L	+/−
1	Unia Leszno	37	16	0	2	+334
2	ROW Rybnik	26	11	1	6	+188
3	Polonia Bydgoszcz	26	11	0	7	+167
4	Falubaz Zielona Góra	23	9	3	6	+60
5	Stal Gorzów Wielkopolski	21	9	3	6	+10
6	Wybrzeże Gdańsk	16	9	0	9	–45
7	Apator Toruń	12	6	2	10	–57
8	Unia Tarnów	12	6	2	10	–121
9	Stal Rzeszów	9	5	1	12	–174
10	Kolejarz Opole	-3	1	2	15	–362

=== Second League ===
Pos	Club	Pts	W	D	L	+/−
1	Ostrovia Ostrów	23	11	0	3	+145
2	Sparta Wrocław	23	10	0	4	+182
3	Motor Lublin	17	7	0	7	+100
4	Włókniarz Częstochowa	16	7	0	7	+71
5	Śląsk Świętochłowice	14	6	1	7	–47
6	Start Gniezno	10	5	1	8	–89
7	GKM Grudziądz	6	5	0	9	–141
8	KKŻ Krosno	3	4	0	10	–221
