= 1986 Polish speedway season =

Motorcycle racing competition

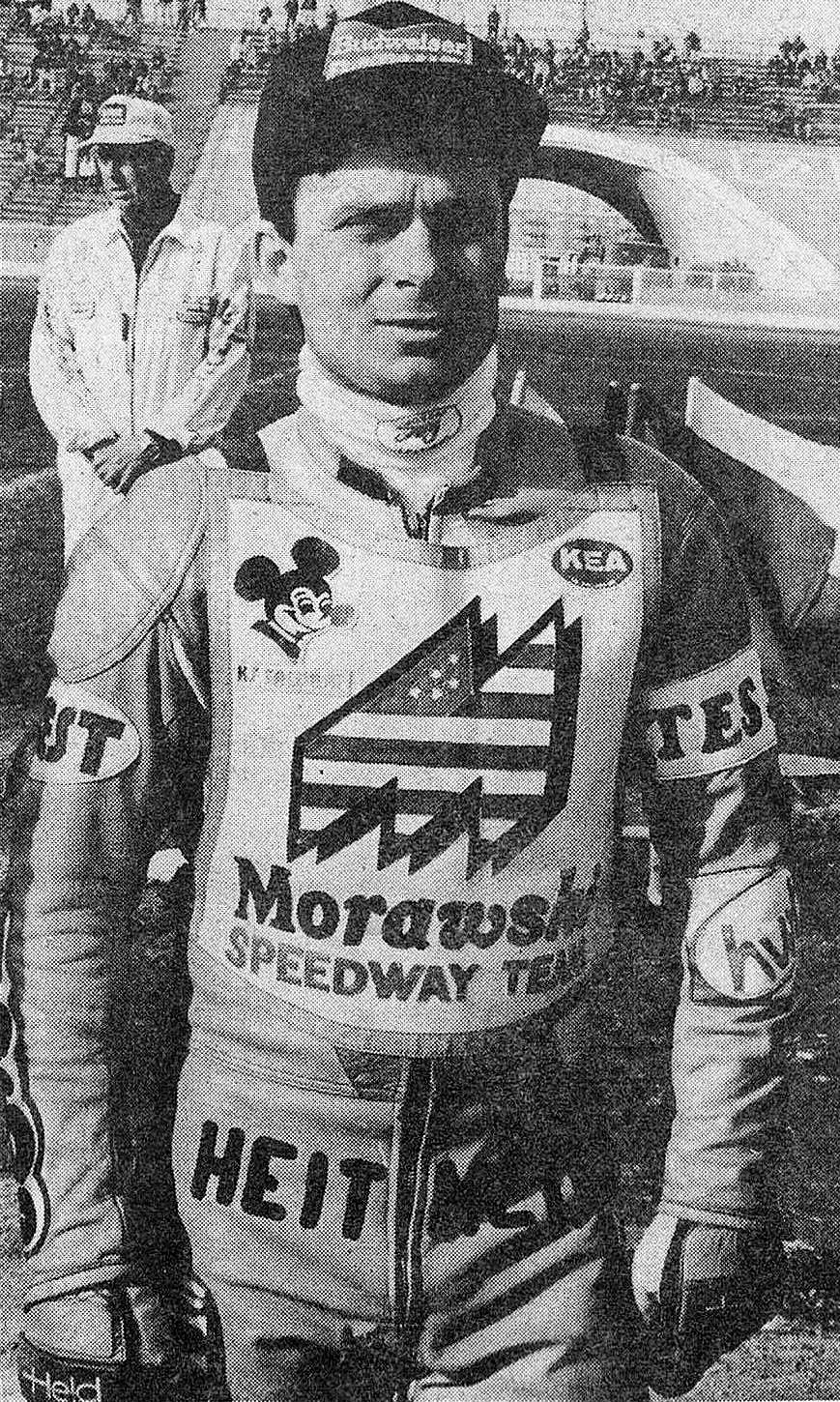
- Maciej Jaworek, 1986 Polish champion

The 1986 Polish Speedway season was the 1986 season of motorcycle speedway in Poland.

== Individual ==
=== Polish Individual Speedway Championship ===
The 1986 Individual Speedway Polish Championship final was held on 14 September at Zielona Góra.

Pos.	Rider	Club	Total	Points
1	Maciej Jaworek	Zielona Góra	15	(3,3,3,3,3)
2	Wojciech Żabiałowicz	Toruń	12 +3	(1,3,2,3,3)
3	Grzegorz Kuźniar	Rzeszów	12 +2	(3,2,3,3,1)
4	Andrzej Huszcza	Zielona Góra	12 +1	(3,2,2,2,3 )
5	Eugeniusz Błaszak	Tarnów	11	(3,3,1,1,3)
6	Zenon Plech	Gdańsk	9	(2,2,3,1,1)
7	Bolesław Proch	Bydgoszcz	8	(2,1,3,2,d)
8	Janusz Stachyra	Rzeszów	7	(0,1,2,2,2)
9	Ryszard Franczyszyn	Gorzów Wlkp.	6	(1,2,0,3,0)
10	Bogusław Nowak	Tarnów	6	(1,3,u,0,2)
11	Piotr Świst	Gorzów Wlkp	6	(2,u,0,2,2)
12	Grzegorz Dzikowski	Gdańsk	5	(1,1,2,1,0)
13	Henryk Bem	Rybnik	4	(0,0,1,1,2)
14	Marek Kępa	Lublin	4	(2,0,1,d,1)
15	Zenon Kasprzak	Leszno	2	(0,0,1,0,1)
16	Roman Jankowski	Leszno	0	(0,d,–,–,–)
17	Mirosław Berliński (res)	Gdańsk	0	(0,0)
18	Leon Kujawski (res)	Gniezno	0	(0)

=== Golden Helmet ===
The 1986 Golden Golden Helmet (Polish: Turniej o Złoty Kask, ZK) organised by the Polish Motor Union (PZM) was the 1986 event for the league's leading riders. The final was held over four rounds.

Pos.	Rider	Club	Total	Points
1	Roman Jankowski	Leszno	50	(15,7,14,14)
2	Wojciech Żabiałowicz	Toruń	49+3	(14,11,12,12)
3	Andrzej Huszcza	Zielona Góra	49+2	(13,12,11,13)
4	Maciej Jaworek	Zielona Góra	43	(12,11,7,13)
5	Zenon Kasprzak	Leszno	42	(8,15,9,10)
6	Ryszard Dolomisiewicz	Bydgoszcz	39	(8,6,14,11)
7	Marek Kępa	Lublin	37	(8,7,12,10)
8	Grzegorz Sterna	Leszno	24	(2,6,8,8)
9	Jerzy Rembas	Gorzów Wlkp.	20	(10,3,7,0)
10	Grzegorz Dzikowski	Gdańsk	20	(11,3,6,-)
11	Eugeniusz Miastkowski	Toruń	19	(5,6,5,3)
12	Dariusz Stenka	Gdańsk	15	(-,5,4,6)
13	Jerzy Kochman	Świętochłowice	14	(4,7,3,-)
14	Mirosław Berliński	Gdańsk	12	(6,1,2,3)
15	Ryszard Franczyszyn	Gorzów Wlkp.	10	(1,9,0-)
16	Zbigniew Błażejczak	Zielona Góra	7	(7,-,-,-)
17	Zdzisław Rutecki	Bydgoszcz	5	(5,-,-,-)

=== Junior Championship ===
- winner - Ryszard Dołomisiewicz

=== Silver Helmet ===
- winner - Ryszard Dołomisiewicz

=== Bronze Helmet ===
- winner - Piotr Świst

== Pairs ==
=== Polish Pairs Speedway Championship ===
The 1986 Polish Pairs Speedway Championship was the 1986 edition of the Polish Pairs Speedway Championship. The final was held on 24 April at Toruń.

Pos	Team	Pts	Riders
1	Apator Toruń	41	Wojciech Żabiałowicz 29, Grzegorz Śniegowski 11, Stanisław Miedziński 1
2	Wybrzeże Gdańsk	36	Mirosław Berliński 7, Dariusz Stenka 16, Zenon Plech 13
3	Falubaz Zielona Góra	28	Andrzej Huszcza 16, Maciej Jaworek 12
4	Unia Leszno	35	Roman Jankowski 18, Zenon Kasprzak 17
5	Polonia Bydgoszcz	29	Bolesław Proch 16, Zdzisław Rutecki 1, Marek Ziarnik 12
6	ROW Rybnik	29	Henryk Bem 17, Piotr Pyszny 2, Antoni Skupień 10
7	Unia Tarnów	31	Eugeniusz Błaszak 14, Bogusław Nowak 17
8	Kolejarz Opole	22	Wojciech Załuski 21, Karol Lis 1, Roland Wieczorek 0
9	Stal Rzeszów	16	Ryszard Czarnecki 2, Janusz Stachyra 11, Andrzej Surowiec 3

== Team ==
=== Team Speedway Polish Championship ===
The 1986 Team Speedway Polish Championship was the 1986 edition of the Team Polish Championship.

Apator Toruń won the gold medal. The team included Wojciech Żabiałowicz.

=== First League ===
Pos	Club	Pts	W	D	L	+/−
1	Apator Toruń	24	12	0	6	+212
2	Polonia Bydgoszcz	24	12	0	6	+98
3	Unia Leszno	23	10	3	5	+189
4	Falubaz Zielona Góra	22	10	2	6	+162
5	Stal Gorzów Wielkopolski	21	10	1	7	+115
6	Stal Rzeszów	20	10	0	8	–33
7	Wybrzeże Gdańsk	16	8	0	10	–92
8	ROW Rybnik	14	6	2	10	–135
9	Unia Tarnów	10	5	0	13	–244
10	Kolejarz Opole	6	3	0	15	–272

=== Second League ===
Pos	Club	Pts	W	D	L	+/−
1	Start Gniezno	16	8	0	4	+180
2	Śląsk Świętochłowice	16	8	0	4	+155
3	Ostrovia Ostrów	16	8	0	4	+92
4	Włókniarz Częstochowa	14	7	0	5	+135
5	Motor Lublin	12	6	0	6	+14
6	GKM Grudziądz	10	5	0	7	–133
7	Sparta Wrocław	0	0	0	12	–443
