= 1989 Polish speedway season =

Motorcycle racing competition

The 1989 Polish Speedway season was the 1989 season of motorcycle speedway in Poland.

== Individual ==
=== Polish Individual Speedway Championship ===
The 1989 Individual Speedway Polish Championship final was held on 15 October at Leszno.

Pos.	Rider	Club	Total	Points
1	Wojciech Załuski	Opole	13	(3,3,3,2,2)
2	Jan Krzystyniak	Rzeszów	12 +3	(3,1,2,3,3)
3	Tomasz Gollob	Gdańsk	12 +2	(1,2,3,3,3)
4	Janusz Stachyra	Rzeszów	10	(1,1,2,3,3)
5	Piotr Świst	Gorzów Wlkp.	10	(3,3,1,1,2)
6	Jacek Rempała	Tarnów	10	(2,2,3,2,1)
7	Jerzy Głogowski	Lublin	9	(0,3,3,3,0)
8	Ryszard Dołomisiewicz	Bydgoszcz	9	(3,2,2,0,2)
9	Andrzej Huszcza	Zielona Góra	7	(2,1,d,2,2)
10	Piotr Pawlicki Sr.	Leszno	7	(2,2,1,1,1)
11	Wojciech Żabiałowicz	Toruń	6	(1,0,2,0,3)
12	Sławomir Dudek	Zielona Góra	5	(2,3,0,0,0)
13	Sławomir Drabik	Częstochowa	4	(1,0,1,1,1)
14	Eugeniusz Skupień	Rybnik	3	(0,0,1,2,u)
15	Mirosław Korbel	Rybnik	2	(0,1,0,0,1)
16	Janusz Łukasik	Tarnów	0	(u,–,–,–,–)
17	Jarosław Olszewski (res)	Gdańsk	1	(0,1)
18	Paweł Jąder (res)	Leszno	0	(w,0)

=== Golden Helmet ===
The 1989 Golden Golden Helmet (Polish: Turniej o Złoty Kask, ZK) organised by the Polish Motor Union (PZM) was the 1989 event for the league's leading riders. The final was held over two rounds.

Pos.	Rider	Club	Total	Points
1	Wojciech Załuski	Opole	29	(15,14)
2	Andrzej Huszcza	Zielona Góra	27	(13,14)
3	Janusz Stachyra	Rzeszów	24	(12,12)
4	Bronisław Klimowicz	Rybnik	17	(10,7)
5	Jacek Rempała	Tarnów	16	(7,9)
6	Jan Krzystyniak	Rzeszów	16	(9,7)
7	Stanisław Pogorzelski	Opole	13	(4,9)
8	Sławomir Drabik	Częstochowa	10	(3,7)
9	Eugeniusz Skupień	Rybnik	10	(4,6)
10	Janusz Kapustka	Tarnów	9	(5,4)
11	Sławomir Tronina	Tarnów	5	(4,1)
12	Dariusz Rachwalik	Częstochowa	4	(2,2)

=== Junior Championship ===
- winner - Piotr Świst

=== Silver Helmet ===
- winner - Piotr Świst

=== Bronze Helmet ===
- winner - Jacek Rempała

== Pairs ==
=== Polish Pairs Speedway Championship ===
The 1989 Polish Pairs Speedway Championship was the 1989 edition of the Polish Pairs Speedway Championship. The final was held on 6 July at Leszno.

Pos	Team	Pts	Riders
1	Unia Leszno	47	Roman Jankowski 23, Zenon Kasprzak 24, Piotr Pawlicki Sr. 0
2	Stal Rzeszów	38	Jan Krzystyniak 21, Janusz Stachyra 17
3	Stal Gorzów Wlkp.	33	Piotr Świst 10, Ryszard Franczyszyn 7, Krzysztof Okupski 16
4	Polonia Bydgoszcz	26	Ryszard Dołomisiewicz 20, Jacek Woźniak 6
5	Unia Tarnów	29	Janusz Kapustka 22, Janusz Łukasik 0, Sławomir Tronina 7
6	Włókniarz Częstochowa	28	Sławomir Drabik 19, Dariusz Rachwalik 7, Janusz Sikoń 2
7	Apator Toruń	24	Wojciech Żabiałowicz 21, Stanisław Miedziński 0, Robert Sawina 3
8	ROW Rybnik	23	Mirosław Korbel 10, Henryk Bem 7, Adam Pawliczek 6
9	Falubaz Zielona Góra	21	Sławomir Dudek 11, Zbigniew Błażejczak 8, Jarosław Szymkowiak 2

== Team ==
=== Team Speedway Polish Championship ===
The 1989 Team Speedway Polish Championship was the 1989 edition of the Team Polish Championship.

Unia Leszno won the gold medal for the third consecutive season. The team included Roman Jankowski, Zenon Kasprzak, Piotr Pawlicki Sr. and Zbigniew Krakowski.

=== First League ===
Pos	Club	Pts	W	D	L	+/−
1	Unia Leszno	32	14	0	4	+230
2	Falubaz Zielona Góra	31	14	1	3	+200
3	ROW Rybnik	27	12	1	5	+133
4	Apator Toruń	24	10	2	6	+103
5	Stal Gorzów Wielkopolski	23	10	0	8	+99
6	Stal Rzeszów	22	9	2	7	+101
7	Polonia Bydgoszcz	18	7	1	10	+14
8	Unia Tarnów	10	5	1	12	–121
9	Wybrzeże Gdańsk	9	5	0	13	–80
10	Ostrovia Ostrów	–16	0	0	18	–679

=== Second League ===
Pos	Club	Pts	W	D	L	+/−
1	Motor Lublin	32	12	1	1	+378
2	Kolejarz Opole	26	11	0	3	+218
3	Włókniarz Częstochowa	23	10	1	3	+158
4	Śląsk Świętochłowice	15	7	0	7	–10
5	Sparta Wrocław	13	6	0	8	–32
6	Start Gniezno	10	5	0	9	–61
7	KKŻ Krosno	0	3	0	11	–283
8	GKM Grudziądz	–7	1	0	13	–368
