= Silver Helmet (Poland) =

Speedway competition in Poland

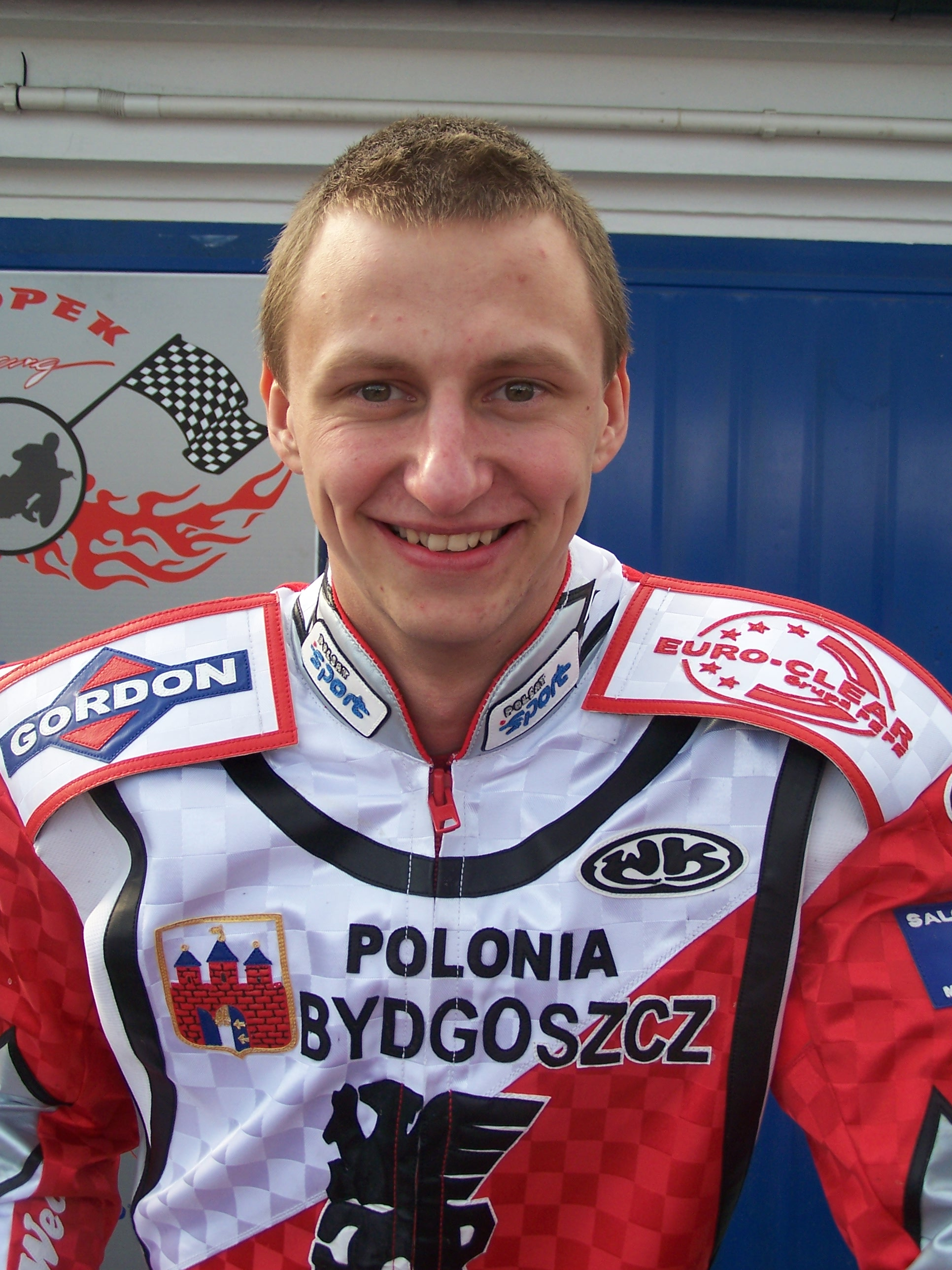
2007 Silver Helmet Winner Marcin Jędrzejewski.

The Silver Helmet (Polish: Turniej o Srebrny Kask, SK) is an annual speedway event held each year organised by the Polish Motor Union (PZM) since 1966.

== Previous winners ==
Year	Venue	Winners	2nd place	3rd place
1966	3 events	Zygfryd Friedek; Kolejarz Opole	Wiktor Jastrzębski; Włókniarz Częstochowa	Henryk Glücklich; Polonia Bydgoszcz
1967	5 events	Edward Jancarz; Stal Gorzów Wlkp.	Zygfryd Friedek; Kolejarz Opole	Bogdan Szuluk; Stal Toruń
1968	5 events	Piotr Bruzda; Sparta Wrocław	Stanisław Kasa; Polonia Bydgoszcz	Ryszard Dziatkowski; Stal Gorzów Wlkp.
1969	5 events	Jerzy Szczakiel; Kolejarz Opole	Marek Cieślak; Włókniarz Częstochowa	Ryszard Dziatkowski; Stal Gorzów Wlkp.
1970	6 events	Zbigniew Marcinkowski; Zgrzeblarki Zielona Góra	Paweł Protasiewicz; Zgrzeblarki Zielona Góra	Leszek Marsz; Wybrzeże Gdańsk
1971	6 events	Zenon Plech+ Stal Gorzów Wlkp.	Grzegorz Kuźniar+ Stal Rzeszów	Zbigniew Marcinkowski+ Zgrzeblarki Zielona Góra
1972	8 events	Andrzej Tkocz; ROW Rybnik	Bernard Jąder; Unia Leszno	Zygmunt Słowiński; Sparta Wrocław
1973	8 events	Zbigniew Filipiak; Falubaz Zielona Góra	Bogusław Nowak; Stal Gorzów Wlkp.	Piotr Pyszny; ROW Rybnik
1974	4 events	Gerard Stach; Kolejarz Opole	Jerzy Rembas; Stal Gorzów Wlkp.	Marian Witelus; Kolejarz Opole
1975	8 events	Bolesław Proch; Falubaz Zielona Góra	Ryszard Fabiszewski; Stal Gorzów Wlkp.	Eugeniusz Błaszak; Start Gniezno
1976	2 events	Mariusz Okoniewski; Unia Leszno	Roman Jankowski; Unia Leszno	Andrzej Huszcza; Falubaz Zielona Góra
1977	2 events	Andrzej Huszcza; Falubaz Zielona Góra	Mariusz Okoniewski; Unia Leszno	Kazimierz Adamczak; Unia Leszno
1978	Opole	Andrzej Huszcza; Falubaz Zielona Góra	Henryk Olszak; Falubaz Zielona Góra	Andrzej Marynowski; Wybrzeże Gdańsk
1979	Zielona Góra	Roman Jankowski; Unia Leszno	Marek Towalski; Gorzów Wlkp.	Andrzej Huszcza; Zielona Góra
1980	Zielona Góra	Maciej Jaworek; Zielona Góra	Marek Kępa; Motor Lublin	Wojciech Żabiałowicz; Apator Toruń
1981	Toruń	Mirosław Berliński; Wybrzeże Gdańsk	Herbert Karwat; Kolejarz Opole	Maciej Jaworek; Zielona Góra
1982	Rybnik	Maciej Jaworek; Zielona Góra	Wojciech Załuski; Kolejarz Opole	Andrzej Gąbka; Motor Lublin
1983	Toruń	Wojciech Załuski; Kolejarz Opole	Krzysztof Grzelak; Stal Gorzów Wlkp.	Zenon Kasprzak; Leszno
1984	Lublin	Ryszard Dołomisiewicz; Polonia Bydgoszcz	Wojciech Załuski; Kolejarz Opole	Ryszard Gabrych; Polonia Bydgoszcz
1985	2 events	Ryszard Franczyszyn; Stal Gorzów Wlkp.	Sławomir Dudek; Zielona Góra	Ryszard Dołomisiewicz; Polonia Bydgoszcz
1986	2 events	Ryszard Dołomisiewicz; Polonia Bydgoszcz	Piotr Świst; Gorzów Wlkp.	Zbigniew Krakowski; Unia Leszno
1987	2 events	Ryszard Dołomisiewicz; Polonia Bydgoszcz	Cezary Owiżyc; Gorzów Wlkp.	Piotr Glücklich; Polonia Bydgoszcz
1988	events	Jarosław Olszewski; Wybrzeże Gdańsk	Waldemar Cieślewicz; Polonia Bydgoszcz	Jacek Gomólski; Polonia Bydgoszcz
1989	2 events	Piotr Świst; Gorzów Wlkp.	Tomasz Gollob; Wybrzeże Gdańsk	Jarosław Szymkowiak; Zielona Góra
1990	Zielona Góra	Tomasz Gollob; Polonia Bydgoszcz	Jarosław Szymkowiak; Zielona Góra	Jarosław Olszewski; Wybrzeże Gdańsk
1991	2 events	Jacek Rempała; Tarnów	Andrzej Zarzecki; Zielona Góra	Robert Sawina; Apator Toruń
1992	Grudziądz	Tomasz Gollob; Polonia Bydgoszcz	Tomasz Bajerski; Apator Toruń	Robert Sawina; Apator Toruń
1993	Machowa	Tomasz Kruk; Zielona Góra	Mirosław Cierniak; Unia Tarnów	Piotr Winiarz; Stal Rzeszów
1994	Gorzów Wlkp.	Piotr Baron; Sparta Wrocław	Robert Flis; Stal Gorzów Wlkp.	Tomasz Świątkiewicz; Apator Toruń
1995	Toruń	Rafał Dobrucki; Piła	Sebastian Ułamek; Częstochowa	Waldemar Walczak; Piła
1996	Zielona Góra	Wiesław Jaguś; Toruń	Piotr Protasiewicz; Wrocław	Rafał Dobrucki; Piła
1997	Leszno	Rafał Dobrucki; Piła	Rafał Okoniewski; Piła	Grzegorz Walasek; Zielona Góra]
1998	Leszno	Rafał Okoniewski; Piła	Krzysztof Cegielski; Gorzów	Krzysztof Jabłoński; Gniezno
1999	Grudziądz	Mariusz Franków; Piła	Mariusz Węgrzyk; Wrocław	Tomasz Cieślewicz; Gorzów
2000	Toruń	Jarosław Hampel; Polonia Piła	Mariusz Węgrzyk; Atlas Wrocław	Tomasz Chrzanowski; Apator Toruń
2001	Zielona Góra	Rafał Okoniewski; Gorzów	Jarosław Hampel; Piła	Dawid Kujawa; Zielona Góra
2002	Rybnik	Krzysztof Kasprzak; Leszno	Rafał Kurmański; Zielona Góra	Karol Baran; Rzeszów
2003	Bydgoszcz	Robert Miśkowiak; Piła	Janusz Kołodziej; Tarnów	Tomasz Gapiński; Piła
2004	Zielona Góra	Adrian Miedziński; Toruń	Zbigniew Suchecki; Zielona Góra	Łukasz Romanek; Rybnik
2005	Tarnów	Janusz Kołodziej; Tarnów	Paweł Miesiąc; Rzeszów	Marcin Rempała; Tarnów
2006	Zielona Góra	Karol Ząbik; Toruń	Ronnie Jamroży; Wrocław	Adrian Gomólski; Gniezno
2007	Rybnik	Marcin Jędrzejewski; Polonia Bydgoszcz	Grzegorz Zengota; Zielona Góra	Adrian Gomólski; Start Gniezno
2008	Rzeszów	Maciej Janowski; Wrocław	Grzegorz Zengota; Zielona Góra	Patryk Pawlaszczyk; Rybnik
2009	Częstochowa	Grzegorz Zengota; Zielona Góra	Maciej Janowski; Wrocław	Sławomir Musielak; Leszno
2010	Leszno	Maciej Janowski; Wrocław	Artur Mroczka; Grudziądz	Przemysław Pawlicki; Gorzów
2011	Wrocław	Maciej Janowski; Wrocław	Przemysław Pawlicki; Piła	Patryk Dudek; Zielona Góra
2012	Rzeszów	Przemysław Pawlicki; Leszno	Bartosz Zmarzlik; Gorzów	Maciej Janowski; Tarnów
2013	Rawicz	Piotr Pawlicki Jr. Leszno	Patryk Dudek; Zielona Góra	Bartosz Zmarzlik; Gorzów
2014	Krosno	Piotr Pawlicki Jr. Leszno	Krystian Pieszczek; Gdańsk	Szymon Woźniak; Bydgoszcz
2015	Piła	Kacper Woryna; Rybnik	Maksym Drabik; Wrocław	Adrian Cyfer; Gorzów
2016	Rawicz	Krystian Pieszczek; Zielona Góra	Bartosz Smektała; Leszno	Adrian Gała; Wrocław
2017	Krosno	Maksym Drabik; Wrocław	Dominik Kubera; Leszno	Bartosz Smektała; Leszno
2018	Lublin	Bartosz Smektała; Leszno	Maksym Drabik; Wrocław	Robert Chmiel; Rybnik
2019	Grudziądz	Dominik Kubera; Leszno	Michał Gruchalski; Częstochowa	Wiktor Lampart; Lublin
2020	Gdańsk	Dominik Kubera; Leszno	Wiktor Trofymow; Lublin	Jakub Miśkowiak; Częstochowa
2021	Bydgoszcz	Jakub Miśkowiak; Częstochowa	Mateusz Świdnicki; Częstochowa	Wiktor Jasiński; Gorzów
2022	Ostrów Wielkopolski	Jakub Miśkowiak; Częstochowa	Kacper Pludra; Grudziądz	Wiktor Przyjemski; Bydgoszcz
2023	Częstochowa	Bartłomiej Kowalski; Wrocław	Damian Ratajczak; Leszno	Kacper Pludra; Grudziądz
2024	Grudziądz	Bartosz Bańbor; Lublin	Kacper Łobodziński; Grudziądz	Jakub Krawczyk; Wrocław
2025	Świętochłowice	Wiktor Przyjemski; Lublin	Paweł Sitek; Ostrów	Maksymilian Pawełczak; Bydgoszcz

- (+1971, all three riders finished on 54 points)
