= 1987 Polish speedway season =

Motorcycle racing competition

The 1987 Polish Speedway season was the 1987 season of motorcycle speedway in Poland.

== Individual ==
=== Polish Individual Speedway Championship ===
The 1987 Individual Speedway Polish Championship final was held over 2 days on 29 and 30 August at Toruń.

Pos.	Rider	Club	Total	Points
1	Wojciech Żabiałowicz	Toruń	29	(15,14)
2	Zenon Kasprzak	Leszno	24	(12,12)
3	Roman Jankowski	Leszno	23	(14,9)
4	Piotr Świst	Gorzów Wlkp.	22	(10,12)
5	Andrzej Huszcza	Zielona Góra	21	(10,11)
6	Ryszard Dołomisiewicz	Bydgoszcz	19	(7,12)
7	Zbigniew Krakowski	Leszno	15	(10,5)
8	Zdzisław Rutecki	Bydgoszcz	13	(4,9)
9	Józef Kafel	Częstochowa	12	(3,9)
10	Stanisław Miedziński	Toruń	12	(7,5)
11	Bogusław Nowak	Tarnów	10	(7,3)
12	Jan Krzystyniak	Leszno	10	(8,2)
13	Eugeniusz Skupień	Rybnik	9	(4,5)
14	Grzegorz Kuźniar	Rzeszów	7	(5,2)
15	Grzegorz Dzikowski	Gdańsk	2	(2,0)
16	Wojciech Załuski	Opole	2	(2,–)

=== Golden Helmet ===
The 1987 Golden Golden Helmet (Polish: Turniej o Złoty Kask, ZK) organised by the Polish Motor Union (PZM) was the 1987 event for the league's leading riders. The final was held over four rounds.

Pos.	Rider	Club	Total	Points
1	Zenon Kasprzak	Leszno	46	(7,15,11,13)
2	Wojciech Żabiałowicz	Toruń	43	(10,12,9,12)
3	Roman Jankowski	Leszno	42	(7,12,13,10)
4	Piotr Świst	Gorzów Wlkp.	40	(11,7,10,12)
5	Zbigniew Krakowski	Leszno	39	(12,6,11,10)
6	Andrzej Huszcza	Zielona Góra	39	(15,10,7,7)
7	Wojciech Załuski	Opole	33	(8,12,5,8)
8	Bogusław Nowak	Tarnów	28	(7,6,8,7)
9	Cezary Owiżyc	Gorzów Wlkp.	26	(-,8,4,14)
10	Stanisław Miedziński	Toruń	25	(8,2,10,5)
11	Zdzisław Rutecki	Bydgoszcz	23	(3,6,8,6)
12	Grzegorz Dzikowski	Gdańsk	21	(5,7,8,1)
13	Ryszard Franczyszyn	Gorzów Wlkp.	14	(7,6,1,0)
14	Marek Ziarnik	Bydgoszcz	13	(3,-,5,5)
15	Marek Kępa	Lublin	12	(5,0,0,7)
16	Krzysztof Okupski	Gorzów Wlkp.	12	(3,7,2,0)
17	Krzysztof Ziarnik	Bydgoszcz	12	(-,1,8,3)
18	Dariusz Stenka	Gdańsk	9	(9,-,-,-)

=== Junior Championship ===
- winner - Piotr Świst

=== Silver Helmet ===
- winner - Ryszard Dołomisiewicz

=== Bronze Helmet ===
- winner - Piotr Świst

== Pairs ==
=== Polish Pairs Speedway Championship ===
The 1987 Polish Pairs Speedway Championship was the 1987 edition of the Polish Pairs Speedway Championship. The final was held on 7 May at Ostrów Wielkopolski.

Pos	Team	Pts	Riders
1	Unia Leszno	49	Roman Jankowski 17, Zenon Kasprzak 28, Jan Krzystyniak 4
2	Stal Gorzów Wlkp.	39	Ryszard Franczyszyn 28, Piotr Świst 4, Krzysztof Okupski 7
3	Wybrzeże Gdańsk	37	Grzegorz Dzikowski 24, Dariusz Stenka 13
4	Polonia Bydgoszcz	39	Ryszard Dołomisiewicz 24, Marek Ziarnik 6, Zdzisław Rutecki 9
5	Falubaz Zielona Góra	27	Andrzej Huszcza 23, Zbigniew Błażejczak 1, Wiesław Pawlak 3
6	Unia Tarnów	22	Sławomir Tronina 3, Bogusław Nowak 14, Janusz Łukasik 5
7	ROW Rybnik	25	Mirosław Korbel 9, Piotr Pyszny 0, Henryk Bem 16
8	Ostrovia Ostrów Wlkp.	19	Jacek Brucheiser 15, Ryszard Małecki 2, Franciszek Jaziewicz 2
9	Start Gniezno	13	Leon Kujawski 10, Mieczysław Woźniak 3, Piotr Podrzycki 0

== Team ==
=== Team Speedway Polish Championship ===
The 1987 Team Speedway Polish Championship was the 1987 edition of the Team Polish Championship.

Unia Leszno won the gold medal. The team included Roman Jankowski, Zenon Kasprzak, Mariusz Okoniewski and Jan Krzystyniak.

=== First League ===
Pos	Club	Pts	W	D	L	+/−
1	Unia Leszno	41	16	1	1	+359
2	Polonia Bydgoszcz	30	13	0	5	+187
3	Stal Gorzów Wielkopolski	27	12	0	6	+172
4	Apator Toruń	25	10	1	7	+158
5	Falubaz Zielona Góra	14	7	0	11	–22
6	ROW Rybnik	13	7	0	11	–68
7	Wybrzeże Gdańsk	11	6	1	11	–95
8	Stal Rzeszów	11	7	0	11	–107
9	Unia Tarnów	4	5	0	13	–263
10	Start Gniezno	3	5	1	12	–321

=== Second League ===
Pos	Club	Pts	W	D	L	+/−
1	Kolejarz Opole	25	10	0	2	+233
2	Włókniarz Częstochowa	23	10	0	2	+143
3	Sparta Wrocław	12	6	0	6	–21
4	Ostrovia Ostrów	11	6	0	6	–26
5	Śląsk Świętochłowice	7	4	0	8	–53
6	Motor Lublin	6	4	0	8	–62
7	GKM Grudziądz	0	2	0	10	–214
