= 1985 Criterium of Polish Speedway Leagues Aces =

Polish speedway event

1985 Criterium of Aces

Seasons
- ← 1984 1986 →

The 4th Criterium of Polish Speedway League Aces was the 1985 version of the Criterium of Polish Speedway Leagues Aces. It took place on March 24 in the Polonia Stadium in Bydgoszcz, Poland.

== Final standings ==
Pos.	Rider name	Pts.
1	Wojciech Żabiałowicz (TOR)	14+3
2	Andrzej Huszcza (ZIE)	14+E
3	Leonard Raba (OPO)	13
4	Grzegorz Dzikowski (GDA)	11
5	Ryszard Dołomisiewicz (BYD)	10
6	Bolesław Proch (BYD)	10
7	Paweł Bukiej (BYD)	9
8	Piotr Podrzycki (GNI)	7
9	Andrzej Maroszek (BYD)	7
10	Jacek Brucheiser (OST)	6
11	Marek Ziarnik (BYD)	4
12	Zdzisław Rutecki (BYD)	3
13	Krzysztof Nurzyński (LUB)	3
14	Jerzy Kochman (ŚWI)	3
15	Lech Kędziora (GRU)	2
16	Zenon Kasprzak (LES)	1
R1	Zbigniew Bizoń (BYD)	2
R2	Ryszard Buśkiewicz (BYD)	1

== Sources ==
- Roman Lach - Polish Speedway Almanac
