= 1984 Criterium of Polish Speedway Leagues Aces =

Polish speedway event

1984 Criterium of Aces

Seasons
- ← 1983 1985 →

The 3rd Criterium of Polish Speedway League Aces was the 1984 version of the Criterium of Polish Speedway Leagues Aces. It took place on March 25 in the Polonia Stadium in Bydgoszcz, Poland.

== Starting positions draw ==
1. Zdzisław Rutecki - Polonia Bydgoszcz
2. Zenon Kasprzak - Unia Leszno
3. Eugeniusz Błaszak - Stal Rzeszów
4. Ryszard Fabiszewski - Polonia Bydgoszcz
5. Bolesław Proch - Polonia Bydgoszcz
6. Edward Jancarz - Stal Gorzów Wlkp.
7. Jerzy Rembas - Stal Gorzów Wlkp.
8. Marek Kępa - Start Gniezno
9. Eugeniusz Miastkowski - Apator Toruń
10. Zenon Plech - Wybrzeże Gdańsk
11. Ryszard Buśkiewicz - Polonia Bydgoszcz
12. Andrzej Huszcza - Falubaz Zielona Góra
13. Roman Jankowski - Unia Leszno
14. Maciej Jaworek - Falubaz Zielona Góra
15. Wojciech Żabiałowicz - Apator Toruń
16. Leonard Raba - Kolejarz Opole
17. (R1) Marek Makowski - GKM Grudziądz
18. (R2) Marek Ziarnik - Polonia Bydgoszcz

== Heat details ==
Placing	Rider	Total	1	2	3	4	5	6	7	8	9	10	11	12	13	14	15	16	17	18	19	20	Pts	Pos	21	22
1	(12) Andrzej Huszcza (ZIE)	12			2					2		3			3						2		12	1		3
2	(5) Bolesław Proch (BYD)	12		1			3					2					3					3	12	2		2
3	(6) Edward Jancarz (GOR)	12		3				2			3							3			1		12	3		1
4	(7) Jerzy Rembas (GOR)	11		2					3					3	2					1			11	4	3	
5	(16) Leonard Raba (OPO)	11				3				3	1						2			2			11	5	2	
6	(11) Ryszard Buśkiewicz (BYD)	10			3				2		2					1						2	10	6		
7	(2) Zenon Kasprzak (LES)	9	0					3				0				3				3			9	7		
8	(3) Eugeniusz Błaszak (RZE)	7	2						0				1				1				3		7	8		
9	(9) Eugeniusz Miastkowski (TOR)	7			1		2						2					2		0			7	9		
10	(13) Roman Jankowski (LES)	7				2	1							2		2					-		7	10		
11	(15) Wojciech Żabiałowicz (TOR)	5				1			1			1						0	2				5	11		
12	(4) Ryszard Fabiszewski (BYD)	5	1							1				1				1				1	5	12		
13	(14) Maciej Jaworek (ZIE)	4				0		0					3		1							F	4	13		
14	(1) Zdzisław Rutecki (BYD)	3	3				0				-				-				-				3	14		
15	(10) Zenon Plech (GDA)	1			0			1						0			0		-				1	15		
16	(8) Marek Kępa (GNI)	0		0						0			0			0			X				0	16		
R1	(R1) Marek Makowski (GRU)	1									0								1				1	R1		
R2	(R2) Marek Ziarnik (BYD)	3													0				3				3	R2		
Placing	Rider	Total	1	2	3	4	5	6	7	8	9	10	11	12	13	14	15	16	17	18	19	20	Pts	Pos	21	22

m - exclusion for exceeding two minute time allowance • t - exclusion for touching the tapes • x - other exclusion • e - retired or mechanical failure • f - fell • ns - non-starter • nc - non-classify

gate A - inside	gate B	gate C	gate D - outside

== Sources ==
- Roman Lach - Polish Speedway Almanac
