= 1983 Criterium of Polish Speedway Leagues Aces =

Polish speedway event

1983 Criterium of Aces

Seasons
- ← 1982 1984 →

The 2nd Criterium of Polish Speedway League Aces was the 1983 version of the Criterium of Polish Speedway Leagues Aces. It took place on March 27 in the Polonia Stadium in Bydgoszcz, Poland.

== Final standings ==
Pos.	Rider name	Pts.
1	Andrzej Huszcza (ZIE)	14
2	Roman Jankowski (LES)	13
3	Bolesław Proch (BYD)	12
4	Jerzy Rembas (GOR)	11
5	Wojciech Żabiałowicz (TOR)	10+3
6	Maciej Jaworek (ZIE)	10+F
7	Piotr Pyszny (RYB)	9
8	Marek Ziarnik (BYD)	8
9	Zenon Kasprzak (LES)	7
10	Zdzisław Rutecki (BYD)	6
11	Zenon Plech (GDA)	6
12	Jan Ząbik (TOR)	5
13	Andrzej Maroszek (BYD)	3
14	Leonard Raba (OPO)	2
15	Lech Kędziora (GRU)	2
16	Edward Jancarz (GOR)	1
R1	Kazimierz Ziarnik (BYD)	1
R2	Adam Wolski (BYD)	0
R3	Ryszard Dołomisiewicz (BYD)	0

== Sources ==
- Roman Lach - Polish Speedway Almanac
