= Polish Junior Individual Speedway Championship =

Polish speedway competition

- Sport: Speedway
- Founded: 1967
- No. of teams: 16
- Country: Poland
- Most recent champion: Wiktor Przyjemski

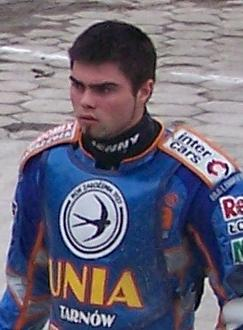
2007 Polish U-21 champion Paweł Hlib

The Individual Speedway Junior Polish Championship (Polish: Młodzieżowe Indywidualne Mistrzostwa Polski, MIMP) is an annual speedway event held each year organized by the Polish Motor Union (PZM) since 1967. Polish riders aged 21 and under take part.

== Previous winners ==
Year	Venue	Winners	2nd place	3rd place
1967	Bydgoszcz	Zbigniew Jąder; Unia Leszno	Zdzisław Dobrucki; Unia Leszno	Bogdan Szuluk; Stal Toruń
1968	Leszno	Zdzisław Dobrucki; Unia Leszno	Zbigniew Jąder; Unia Leszno	Zygmunt Friedek; Kolejarz Opole
1969	Lublin	Zdzisław Dobrucki; Unia Leszno	Jan Ząbik; Stal Toruń	Stanisław Kasa; Polonia Bydgoszcz
1970	Zielona Góra	Stanisław Kasa; Polonia Bydgoszcz	Grzegorz Kuźniar; Stal Rzeszów	Leszek Marsz; Wybrzeże Gdańsk
1971	Toruń	Jerzy Wilim; ROW Rybnik	Zbigniew Filipiak; Zgrzeblarki Zielona Góra	Janusz Plewiński; Stal Toruń
1972	Leszno	Bernard Jąder; Unia Leszno	Jerzy Szczakiel; Kolejarz Opole	Leszek Marsz; Wybrzeże Gdańsk
1973	Zielona Góra	Zbigniew Filipiak; Falubaz Zielona Góra	Franciszek Stach; Kolejarz Opole	Andrzej Jurczyński; Włókniarz Częstochowa
1974	Tarnów	Jerzy Rembas; Stal Gorzów Gorzów Wielkopolski	Franciszek Stach; Kolejarz Opole	Ryszard Fabiszewski; Stal Gorzów Wielkopolski.
1975	Zielona Góra	Bolesław Proch; Falubaz Zielona Góra	Tadeusz Berej; Motor Lublin	Eugeniusz Błaszak; Start Gniezno
1976	Opole	Wiesław Patynek; Polonia Bydgoszcz	Leonard Raba; Kolejarz Opole	Kazimierz Ziarnik; Polonia Bydgoszcz
1977	Bydgoszcz	Marek Ziarnik; Polonia Bydgoszcz	Jacek Goerlitz; Kolejarz Opole	Andrzej Huszcza; Falubaz Zielona Góra
1978	Leszno	Wiesław Patynek; Polonia Bydgoszcz	Andrzej Huszcza; Falubaz Zielona Góra	Roman Jankowski; Unia Leszno
1979	Leszno	Mariusz Okoniewski; Unia Leszno	Marek Towalski; Stal Gorzów	Roman Jankowski; Unia Leszno
1980	Leszno	Mirosław Berliński; Wybrzeże Gdańsk	Grzegorz Sterna; Unia Leszno	Wojciech Żabiałowicz; Apator Toruń
1981	Zielona Góra	Stanisław Pogorzelski; Kolejarz Opole	Marek Kępa; Motor Lublin	Maciej Jaworek; Falubaz Zielona Góra
1982	Opole	Maciej Jaworek; Falubaz Zielona Góra	Wiesław Pankowski; Start Gniezno	Piotr Żyto; Wybrzeże Gdańsk
1983	Gniezno	Piotr Pawlicki, Sr. Unia Leszno	Roman Feld; GKM Grudziądz	Dariusz Stenka; Wybrzeże Gdańsk
1984	Tarnów	Wojciech Załuski; Kolejarz Opole	Adam Pawliczek; ROW Rybnik	Piotr Tomaszewski; Falubaz Zielona Góra
1985	Lublin	Zbigniew Błażejczak; Falubaz Zielona Góra	Janusz Łukasik; Motor Lublin	Dariusz Baliński; Unia Leszno
1986	Toruń	Ryszard Dołomisiewicz; Polonia Bydgoszcz	Piotr Świst; Stal Gorzów Wielkopolski	Sławomir Drabik; Włókniarz Częstochowa
1987	Gorzów Wielkopolski	Piotr Świst; Stal Gorzów Wielkopolski	Ryszard Dołomisiewicz; Polonia Bydgoszcz	Jarosław Olszewski; Wybrzeże Gdańsk
1988	Zielona Góra	Piotr Świst; Stal Gorzów Wielkopolski	Tomasz Fajfer; Start Gniezno	Jacek Gomólski; Polonia Bydgoszcz
1989	Zielona Góra	Piotr Świst; Stal Gorzów Wielkopolski	Jarosław Szymkowiak; Falubaz Zielona Góra	Tomasz Gollob; Wybrzeże Gdańsk
1990	Bydgoszcz	Tomasz Gollob; Polonia Bydgoszcz	Dariusz Fliegert; ROW Rybnik	Jacek Rempała; Unia Tarnów
1991	Toruń	Tomasz Gollob; Polonia Bydgoszcz	Adam Łabędzki; Unia Leszno	Robert Sawina; Apator Toruń
1992	Tarnów	Tomasz Gollob; Polonia Bydgoszcz	Robert Sawina; Apator Toruń	Andrzej Zarzecki; Morawski Zielona Góra
1993	Toruń	Tomasz Bajerski; Apator-Elektrim Toruń	Grzegorz Rempała; Unia Tarnów	Tomasz Świątkiewicz; Apator-Elektrim Toruń
1994	Tarnów	Grzegorz Rempała; Unia Tarnów	Mirosław Cierniak; Unia Tarnów	Rafał Dobrucki; Polonia Piła
1995	Rzeszów	Rafał Dobrucki; Polonia Piła	Piotr Protasiewicz; Sparta-Polsat Wrocław	Piotr Markuszewski; GKM Grudziądz
1996	Rzeszów	Tomasz Bajerski; Apator-DGG Toruń	Rafał Dobrucki; Polonia-Philips Piła	Damian Baliński; Unia Leszno
1997	Częstochowa	Grzegorz Walasek; ZKŻ Polmos Zielona Góra	Piotr Winiarz; Stal-Van Pur Rzeszów	Rafał Dobrucki; Polonia-Philips Piła
1998	Grudziądz	Robert Dados; Kunterszyn-GKM Grudziądz	Krzysztof Pecyna; Polonia Piła	Tomasz Cieślewicz; Wybrzeże Gdańsk
1999	Gniezno	Rafał Okoniewski; Pergo Gorzów Wielkopolski	Krzysztof Cegielski; Pergo Gorzów Wielkopolski	Tomasz Chrzanowski; Apator-Netia Toruń
2000	Gorzów Wielkopolski	Rafał Okoniewski; Pergo Gorzów Wielkopolski	Tomasz Chrzanowski; Apator-Netia Toruń	Jarosław Hampel; Ludwik Polonia Piła
2001	Częstochowa	Jarosław Hampel; BGŻ S.A.-Polonia Piła	Krzysztof Słaboń; Atlas Wrocław	Łukasz Jankowski; Unia Leszno
2002	Leszno	Artur Bogińczuk; Atlas Wrocław	Jarosław Hampel; BGŻ S.A.-Polonia Piła	Janusz Kołodziej; Unia Tarnów
2003	Rybnik	Łukasz Romanek; RKM Rybnik	Adrian Miedziński; Apator-Adriana Toruń	Zbigniew Czerwiński; Top Secret-Włókniarz Częstochowa
2004	Piła	Janusz Kołodziej; Unia Tarnów	Krzysztof Kasprzak; Unia Leszno	Łukasz Romanek; RKM Rybnik
2005	Toruń	Adrian Miedziński; Apator-Adriana Toruń	Janusz Kołodziej; Unia Tarnów	Karol Ząbik; Apator-Adriana Toruń
2006	Toruń	Karol Ząbik; Adriana Toruń	Adrian Miedziński; Adriana Toruń	Paweł Hlib; Unia Tarnów
2007	Rzeszów	Paweł Hlib; Stal Gorzów Wielkopolski	Karol Ząbik; Unibax Toruń	Daniel Pytel; PSŻ Milion Team Poznań
2008	Rybnik	Maciej Janowski; Atlas Wrocław	Daniel Pytel; PSŻ Milion Team Poznań	Grzegorz Zengota; ZKŻ Kronopol Zielona Góra
2009	Leszno	Patryk Dudek; Falubaz Zielona Góra	Sławomir Musielak; Unia Leszno	Dawid Lampart; Marma Hadykówka Rzeszów
2010	Toruń	Maciej Janowski; Atlas Wrocław	Przemyslaw Pawlicki; Stal Gorzów Wielkopolski	Kacper Gomolski; Gniezno
2011	Gorzów	Piotr Pawlicki Jr. Pila	Bartosz Zmarzlik; Stal Gorzów Wielkopolski	Patryk Dudek; ZKŻ Kronopol Zielona Góra
2012	Bydgoszcz	Maciej Janowski; Unia Tarnow	Kamil Adamczewski; Unia Leszno	Krystian Pieszczek; Gdańsk
2013	Łódź	Patryk Dudek; ZKŻ Kronopol Zielona Góra	Paweł Przedpełski; Toruń	Bartosz Zmarzlik; Stal Gorzow Wielkopolski
2014	Gorzów	Szymon Wozniak; Polonia Bydgoszcz	Piotr Pawlicki Jr. Unia Leszno	Bartosz Zmarzlik; Stal Gorzow Wielkopolski
2015	Leszno	Bartosz Zmarzlik; Stal Gorzow Wielkopolski	Piotr Pawlicki Jr. Unia Leszno	Krystian Pieszczek; ZKŻ Kronopol Zielona Góra
2016	Częstochowa	Daniel Kaczmarek; Unia Leszno	Paweł Przedpełski; KS Toruń	Bartosz Smektała; Unia Leszno
2017	Rybnik	Bartosz Smektała; Leszno	Dominik Kubera; Leszno	Kacper Woryna; Rybnik
2018	Częstochowa	Daniel Kaczmarek; Toruń	Bartosz Smektała; Leszno	Maksym Drabik; Wrocław
2019	Tarnów	Jakub Miśkowiak; Częstochowa	Dominik Kubera; Leszno	Wiktor Lampart; Lublin
2020	Zielona Góra	Dominik Kubera; Leszno	Jakub Miśkowiak; Częstochowa	Norbert Krakowiak; Zielona Góra
2021	Częstochowa	Jakub Miśkowiak; Częstochowa	Wiktor Lampart; Lublin	Mateusz Świdnicki; Częstochowa
2022	Częstochowa	Mateusz Świdnicki; Częstochowa	Jakub Miśkowiak; Częstochowa	Wiktor Lampart; Lublin
2023	Lublin	Bartłomiej Kowalski; Wrocław	Bartosz Bańbor; Lublin	Damian Ratajczak; Leszno
2024	Krosno	Jakub Krawczyk; Wrocław	Bartosz Bańbor; Lublin	Oskar Paluch; Gorzów
2025	Bydgoszcz	Wiktor Przyjemski; Lublin	Maksymilian Pawełczak; Bydgoszcz	Bartosz Bańbor; Lublin
