= Bronze Helmet (Poland) =

Speedway competition in Poland

The Bronze Helmet (Polish: Turniej o Brązowy Kask, BK) is an annual speedway event held each year organised by the Polish Motor Union (PZM) since 1976.

== Previous winners ==
Year	Venue	Winners	2nd place	3rd place
1976	Łódź	Alfred Siekierka; Opole	Andrzej Huszcza; Zielona Góra	Marian Witelus; Opole
1977	Gdańsk	Mieczysław Kmieciak; Rybnik	Marek Towalski; Gorzów	Krzysztof Kwiatkowski; Toruń
1978	Rybnik	Mieczysław Kmieciak; Rybnik	Bronisław Klimowicz; Rybnik	Andrzej Huszcza; Zielona Góra
1979	Częstochowa	Józef Kafel; Częstochowa	Marek Kępa; Lublin	Henryk Jasek; Wrocław
1980	Opole	Marek Kępa; Lublin	Herbert Karwat; Opole	Mirosław Berliński; Gdańsk
1981	Świętochłowice	Mirosław Berliński; Gdańsk	Piotr Podrzycki; Gniezno	Marek Bzdęga; Leszno
1983	Ostrów	Ryszard Franczyszyn; Gorzów	Krzysztof Bas; Świętochłowice	Mirosław Daniszewski; Gorzów
1984	Bydgoszcz	Ryszard Dołomisiewicz; Bydgoszcz	Mirosław Daniszewski; Gorzów	Dariusz Rachwalik; Częstochowa
1985	2 events	Zbigniew Błażejczak; Zielona Góra	Ryszard Dołomisiewicz; Bydgoszcz	Piotr Świst; Gorzów
1986	2 events	Piotr Świst; Gorzów	Jarosław Szymkowiak; Zielona Góra	Sławomir Dudek; Zielona Góra
1987	2 events	Piotr Świst; Gorzów	Jarosław Olszewski; Gdańsk	Sławomir Dudek; Zielona Góra
1988	2 events	Jarosław Olszewski; Gdańsk	Jacek Woźniak; Bydgoszcz	Krzysztof Kuczwalski; Toruń
1989	2 events	Jacek Rempała; Tarnów	Janusz Ślączka; Rzeszów	Tomasz Gollob; Gdańsk
1990	Tarnów	Robert Kużdżał; Tarnów	Adam Łabędzki; Tarnów	Jacek Rempała; Tarnów
1991	2 events	Adam Łabędzki; Unia Leszno	Waldemar Szuba; Wrocław	Tomasz Kornacki; Bydgoszcz
1992	Krosno	Maciej Bargiel; Krosno	Piotr Baron; Wrocław	Ireneusz Kwieciński; Krosno
1993	Tarnów	Piotr Baron; Wrocław	Tomasz Bajerski; Toruń	Rafał Dobrucki; Piła
1994	Piła	Waldemar Walczak; Toruń	Rafał Dobrucki; Piła	Robert Mikołajczak; Leszno
1995	Lublin	Rafał Dobrucki; Piła	Tomasz Poprawski; Bydgoszcz	Grzegorz Walasek; Zielona Góra
1996	Bydgoszcz	Damian Baliński; Leszno	Marcin Ryczek; Bydgoszcz	Mariusz Węgrzyk; Rybnik
1997	Piła	Rafał Okoniewski; Piła	Tomasz Cieślewicz; Gniezno	Mariusz Franków; Piła
1998	Ostrów Wlkp.	Rafał Okoniewski; Piła	Krzysztof Cegielski; Gorzów	Paweł Duszyński; Gniezno
1999	Toruń	Rafał Okoniewski; Gorzów	Tomasz Chrzanowski; Toruń	Krzysztof Słaboń; Bydgoszcz
2000	Leszno	Rafał Chromik; RKM Rybnik	Krzysztof Słaboń; Bydgoszcz	Sebastian Smoter; Zielona Góra
2001	Gorzów	Rafał Szombierski; Rybnik	Robert Miśkowiak; Piła	Zbigniew Czerwiński; Częstochowa
2002	Tarnów	Robert Umiński; Bydgoszcz	Norbert Kościuch; Leszno	Krzysztof Kasprzak; Leszno
2003	Toruń	Janusz Kołodziej; Tarnów	Krzysztof Kasprzak; Leszno	Michał Rajkowski; Gorzów
2004	Lublin	Adrian Miedziński; Toruń	Paweł Hlib; Gorzow	Krzysztof Buczkowski; Grudziądz
2005	Zielona Góra	Patryk Pawlaszczyk; Rybnik	Paweł Hlib; Gorzów	Marcin Jędrzejewski; Bydgoszcz
2006	Opole	Mateusz Szczepaniak; Częstochowa	Mateusz Jurga; Leszno	Marcin Jędrzejewski; Bydgoszcz
2007	Gorzów Wlkp.	Adam Kajoch; Leszno	Michał Mitko; Rybnik	Patryk Pawlaszczyk; Rybnik
2008	Gdańsk	Artur Mroczka; Grudziądz	Maciej Janowski; Wrocław	Adrian Szewczykowski; Gorzów
2009	Wrocław	Maciej Janowski; Wrocław	Patryk Dudek; Zielona Góra	Łukasz Sówka; Ostrów
2010	Leszno	Patryk Dudek; Zielona Góra	Maciej Janowski; Wrocław	Przemysław Pawlicki; Gorzów
2011	Częstochowa	Patryk Dudek; Zielona Góra	Piotr Pawlicki Jr. Piła	Oskar Fajfer; Gniezno
2012	Gdańsk	Krystian Pieszczek; Gdańsk	Piotr Pawlicki Jr. Leszno	Kacper Gomólski; Tarnów
2013	Łódź	Krystian Pieszczek; Gdańsk	Bartosz Zmarzlik; Gorzów	Piotr Pawlicki Jr. Leszno
2014	Lublin	Adrian Cyfer; Gorzów	Krystian Pieszczek; Gdańsk	Kacper Woryna; Rybnik
2015	Rawicz	Maksym Drabik; Wrocław	Kacper Woryna; Rybnik	Damian Dróżdż; Wrocław
2016	Opole	Bartosz Smektała; Leszno	Daniel Kaczmarek; Leszno	Alex Zgardziński; Zielona Góra
2017	Świętochłowice	Dominik Kubera+ Leszno	Wiktor Lis+ Leszno	Bartosz Smektała+ Leszno
2018	Gniezno	Dominik Kubera; Leszno	Patryk Wojdyło; Wrocław	Wiktor Lampart; Lublin
2019	Grudziądz	Jakub Miśkowiak; Częstochowa	Wiktor Lampart; Lublin	Karol Żupiński; Gdańsk
2020	Ostrów	Mateusz Cierniak; Tarnów	Sebastian Szostak; Ostrów	Jakub Miśkowiak; Częstochowa
2021	Gdańsk	Mateusz Cierniak; Lublin	Michał Curzytek; Wrocław	Bartłomiej Kowalski; Częstochowa
2022	Tarnów	Jakub Krawczyk; Ostrów	Franciszek Karczewski; Częstochowa	Krzysztof Sadurski; Krosno
2023	Gorzów	Wiktor Przyjemski; Bydgoszcz	Oskar Paluch; Gorzów	Damian Ratajczak; Leszno
2024	Piła	Wiktor Przyjemski; Lublin	Paweł Trześniewski; Rybnik	Bartosz Bańbor; Lublin
2025	Krosno	Franciszek Karczewski; Częstochowa	Kevin Małkiewicz; Grudziądz	Kacper Mania; Leszno

- (+2017, all three riders finished on 9 points)
