= 1982 Criterium of Polish Speedway Leagues Aces =

Polish speedway event

1982 Criterium of Aces

Seasons
- ← none 1983 →

The 1st Criterium of Polish Speedway League Aces was the 1982 version of the Criterium of Polish Speedway Leagues Aces. It took place on March 28 in the Polonia Stadium in Bydgoszcz, Poland.

== Starting positions draw ==
1. Jerzy Kochman - Śląsk Świętochłowice
2. Roman Jankowski - Unia Leszno
3. Andrzej Huszcza - Falubaz Zielona Góra
4. Jan Ząbik - Apator Toruń
5. Bolesław Proch - Polonia Bydgoszcz
6. Alfred Siekierka - Kolejarz Opole
7. Wojciech Żabiałowicz - Apator Toruń
8. Leonard Raba - Kolejarz Opole
9. Edward Jancarz - Stal Gorzów Wlkp.
10. Piotr Pyszny - ROW Rybnik
11. Marek Ziarnik - Polonia Bydgoszcz
12. Marek Kępa - Motor Lublin
13. Zenon Plech - Wybrzeże Gdańsk
14. Piotr Podrzycki - Start Gniezno
15. Ryszard Buśkiewicz - Unia Leszno
16. Eugeniusz Błaszak - Start Gniezno
17. (R1) Andrzej Maroszek - Polonia Bydgoszcz
18. (R2) Ryszard Czarnecki - Stal Rzeszów

== Heat details ==
Placing	Rider	Total	1	2	3	4	5	6	7	8	9	10	11	12	13	14	15	16	17	18	19	20	Pts	Pos	21
1	(11) Marek Ziarnik (BYD)	14			2				3		3					3						3	14	1	
2	(10) Piotr Pyszny (RYB)	13			3			2						3			2		3				13	2	
3	(5) Bolesław Proch (BYD)	12		3			3					1					3					2	12	3	
4	(6) Alfred Siekierka (OPO)	10		1				3			1							3			2		10	4	3
5	(16) Eugeniusz Błaszak (GNI)	10				3				2	2						1			2			10	6	2
6	(8) Leonard Raba (OPO)	10		2						3			1			2			2				10	5	1
7	(7) Wojciech Żabiałowicz (TOR)	9		0					1					2	3					3			9	7	
8	(12) Marek Kępa (LUB)	6			0					1		0			2						3		6	8	
9	(15) Ryszard Buśkiewicz (LES)	6				2			0			3						E	1				6	9	
10	(3) Andrzej Huszcza (ZIE)	5	F						2				2				0				1		5	10	
11	(2) Roman Jankowski (LES)	4	2					0				2				0				0			4	11	
12	(13) Zenon Plech (GDA)	4				0	2							1		1					E		4	12	
13	(14) Piotr Podrzycki (GNI)	4				1		1					0		1							1	4	13	
14	(1) Jerzy Kochman (ŚWI)	3	3				E				0				0				E				3	14	
15	(4) Jan Ząbik (TOR)	3	1							0				0				2				0	3	15	
16	(9) Edward Jancarz (GOR)	1			1		F						-					-		-			1	16	
R1	(R1) Andrzej Maroszek (BYD)	0																					0	R1	
R2	(R2) Ryszard Czarnecki (RZE)	5											3					1		1			5	R2	
Placing	Rider	Total	1	2	3	4	5	6	7	8	9	10	11	12	13	14	15	16	17	18	19	20	Pts	Pos	21

m - exclusion for exceeding two minute time allowance • t - exclusion for touching the tapes • x - other exclusion • e - retired or mechanical failure • f - fell • ns - non-starter • nc - non-classify

gate A - inside	gate B	gate C	gate D - outside

== Sources ==
- Roman Lach - Polish Speedway Almanac
