= Okoniewski =

Okoniewski is a Polish surname. Notable people with the surname include:

- Mariusz Okoniewski (1956–2006), Polish speedway rider
- Rafał Okoniewski (born 1980), Polish speedway rider
- Steve Okoniewski (1949–2024), American football player
