= Piotr Świst =

Polish speedway rider (born 1968)

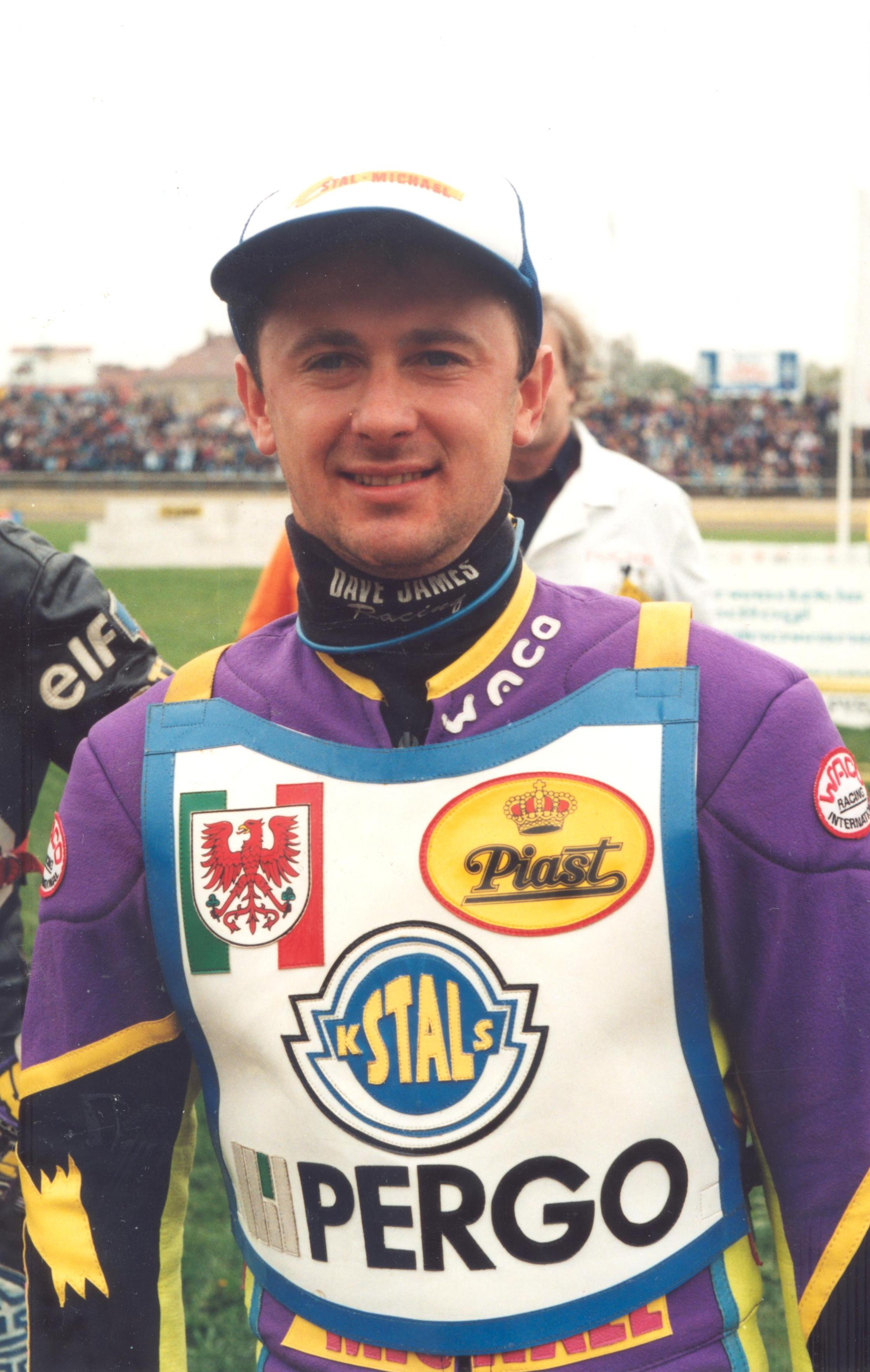
- Born: 20 June 1968 (age 58); Poland
- Nationality: Polish

Career history

Poland
- 1985–1997, 2000–2002: Stal Gorzów
- 1998–1999: Stal Rzeszów
- 2003–2005: Zielona Góra
- 2006: Lublin
- 2007–2008: Daugavpils
- 2009–2010, 2012–2016: Polonia Piła
- 2011: Rivne

Great Britain
- 2005: Arena Essex Hammers
- 2007: Poole Pirates

Sweden
- 1992–1994: Smederna
- 2002: Örnarna
- 2003: Vargarna

Denmark
- 2009–2010: Esbjerg

Individual honours
- 1987 - silver medal: U-21 World Championship
- 1987, 1988, 1989: U-21 Polish Champion
- 1988: Poland Golden Helmet Winner
- 1989: Poland Silver Helmet Winner
- 1986, 1987: Poland Bronze Helmet Winner

Team honours
- 1992: Polish Pairs Champion
- 1992: Allsvenskan Div 1 Champion

Piotr Świst (born 20 June 1968 in Poland) is a former motorcycle speedway rider from Poland. His surname "Świst" means 'whizz' in Polish. He earned 18 international caps for the Poland national speedway team.

== Career ==
Świst spent his first 13 seasons in Poland with Stal Gorzów Wielkopolski from 1985 through to 1997. He won a silver medal in the 1987 Individual Speedway Junior European Championship and three Polish U-21 Championships in 1987, 1988 and 1989. In 1987 he toured the United Kingdom with the Polish team.

Additionally, Świst won the Golden Helmet in 2008 and the Polish Pairs Championship in 1992.

On three occasions, Świst reached the podium of the Polish Individual Speedway Championship (1993, 1995 and 2002).

Świst raced twice in the United Kingdom for the Arena Essex Hammers in 2005 and the Poole Pirates in 2007.

== Results ==
- Individual World Championship
  - 1990 - injury in Continental Semi-Final B
  - 1991 - 10th place (8 points) in Continental Semi-Final B
  - 1992 - 15th place (2 points) in Semi-Final A
  - 1993 - 16th place (1 point) in Semi-Final B
  - 1994 - 15th place (1 point)
- Individual U-21 World Championship
  - 1987 - 2nd place (12 points +3)
  - 1988 - 8th place (9 points)
  - 1989 - 13th place (3 points)
- Team World Championship
  - 1995 - 1 point in Group A
  - 1995 - 9 points in Group B
  - 1996 - 8 points in Group B
  - 1999 - 5 points in Group B
- European Club Champions' Cup
  - 2000 - 2nd place (11 points)
- Individual Polish Championship
  - 1993 - 3rd place
  - 1995 - 2nd place
  - 2002 - 3rd place
- Individual U-21 Polish Championship
  - 1986 - 2nd place
  - 1987 - Polish Champion
  - 1988 - Polish Champion
  - 1989 - Polish Champion
- Polish Pairs Championship
  - 1987 - 2nd place
  - 1988 - 3rd place
  - 1989 - 3rd place
  - 1992 - Polish Champion
  - 1994 - 3rd place
  - 1997 - 3rd place
  - 2003 - 2nd place
- Polish Pairs U-21 Championship
  - 1986 - Polish Champion
  - 1987 - Polish Champion
  - 1988 - 2nd place
  - 1989 - 2nd place
- Team Polish Championship
  - 1984 - 2nd place
  - 1987 - 3rd place
  - 1992 - 2nd place
  - 1997 - 2nd place
  - 1998 - 3rd place
- Golden Helmet
  - 1988 - Winner
  - 1998 - 3rd place
- Silver Helmet (U-21)
  - 1986 - 3rd place
  - 1989 - Winner
- Bronze Helmet (U-19)
  - 1985 - 3rd place
  - 1986 - Winner
  - 1987 - Winner
- Individual Latvian Championship
  - 2008 Daugavpils - 2nd place

== See also ==
- Poland national speedway team
