= Kacper Pludra =

Polish speedway rider

- Born: 21 August 2002 (age 24); Poland
- Nationality: Polish

Career history

Poland
- 2018–2021: Rawicz
- 2020: Leszno
- 2022–2024: Grudziądz
- 2025: Rybnik

Sweden
- 2023: Gislaved
- 2024: Rospiggarna

Individual honours
- 2022, 2023: Silver Helmet 3rd

Kacper Pludra (born 21 August 2002) is an international motorcycle speedway rider from Poland.

== Career ==
At the end of the 2021 season, Unia Leszno sold him to Grudziądz

Pludra's breakthrough year was in 2022, when he won the silver medal in the Silver Helmet during the 2022 Polish speedway season. He was part of the Poland national speedway team, who won the bronze medal at the final of the 2022 European Pairs Speedway Championship, although he was the unused reserve.

In 2023, Pludra entered his second season with Grudziądz, won the bronze medal in the Silver Helmet and he just missed qualifying for the 2023 SGP2. In 2024, he continued riding for Grudziądz.
