= Adam Łabędzki =

Polish speedway rider

- Born: 22 September 1972 (age 54); Kościan, Poland
- Nationality: Polish

Career history

Poland
- 1989–1996: Leszno
- 1997: Łódź
- 1998–1999: Wrocław
- 2000–2001, 2003: Opole
- 2002: Rawicz

Great Britain
- 2001: Belle Vue Aces

Individual honours
- 1996: Polish Individual Speedway Championship silver

Team honours
- 1989: Polish league champion

Adam Łabędzki (born 22 September 1972) is a former motorcycle speedway rider from Poland. He earned three international caps for the Poland national speedway team.

== Career ==
Łabędzki started his speedway career with Unia Leszno during the 1989 Polish speedway season. He spent his first seven Polish leagues seasons with the club and helped them win the Team Speedway Polish Championship during his debut season.

Łabędzki reached two finals of the Speedway Under-21 World Championship in 1991 and 1993.

During his last season with Leszno in 1996, Łabędzki finished runner-up to Sławomir Drabik in the Polish Individual Speedway Championship.

In 1997, Łabędzki spent the season with Łódź before joining Sparta Wrocław for two years. While with Kolejarz Opole, he also signed for his first and only season in the British speedway leagues, riding for Belle Vue Aces during the 2001 Elite League speedway season.
