= Mariusz Okoniewski =

Polish speedway rider

- Born: 10 February 1956; Poznań, Poland
- Died: 10 February 2006 (aged 50); Śmigiel, Poland
- Nationality: Polish

Career history
- 1974-1981, 1983-1988: Unia Leszno

Individual honours
- 1979: U-21 Polish Champion
- 1976: Silver Helmet Winner

Team honours
- 1979, 1980, 1987, 1988: Team Polish Champion

Mariusz Okoniewski (10 February 1956, in Poznań – 10 February 2006, in Śmigiel) was a Polish motorcycle speedway rider.

== Career ==
Okoniewski won the Team Speedway Polish Championship six times and Polish Silver Helmet in 1976.

Okoniewski's son Rafał (born 1980) is also a speedway rider. Rafał is the only double Individual U-19 European Champion.

After his racing career, Okoniewski became a coach. He died on his 50th birthday.

== Career ==
- Individual Under-21 European Championship
  - 1977 - 8th place (4 points)
- Individual Under-21 Polish Championship
  - 1979 - Polish Champion
- Golden Helmet
  - 1979 - 3rd place
- Silver Helmet (U-21)
  - 1976 - Winner
  - 1977 - 2nd place

== See also ==
- Poland national speedway team
