= Piotr Baron =

Polish speedway rider

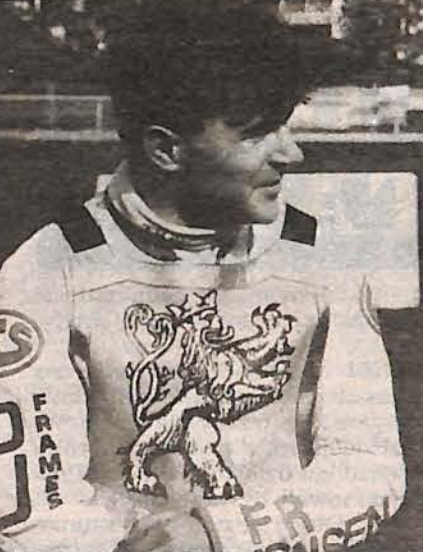
- Born: 5 February 1974 (age 52); Toruń, Poland
- Nationality: Polish

Career history

Poland
- 1990, 2000: Toruń
- 1991: Grudziądz
- 1992–1999, 2002: Wrocław
- 2001: Opole

Team honours
- 2003, 2004 and 2005: Polish league champion

Piotr Baron (born 5 February 1974) is a former motorcycle speedway rider from Poland.

== Career ==
Baron represented Poland during the 1993 Speedway World Team Cup and won the 1993 Bronze Helmet.

Baron spent the majority of his career riding for Wrocław, where he won three Polish league championships in 2003, 2004 and 2005.

After retiring, Baron later became the team manager of Unia Leszno. In 2023, he took a coaching role with the KS Toruń team.

== Major results ==
=== World Cup ===
- 1993 - 3rd place in Group A (7 points)
