= Golden Helmet (Poland) =

Speedway competition in Poland

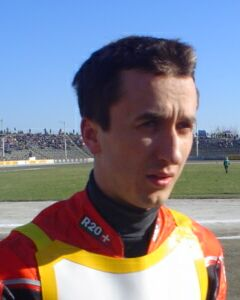
- 2007 winner Grzegorz Walasek
- Sport: Motorcycle speedway
- Founded: 1961
- Most titles: Tomasz Gollob (7)

The Golden Helmet (Polish: Turniej o Złoty Kask, ZK) is an annual speedway event in Poland. It has been organised by the Polish Motor Union (PZM) since 1961. The race is held with the top twelve riders in the Ekstraliga and the top four riders in the Polish Speedway First League. The winner receives a new Jawa motorcycle.

== Previous winners ==
Year		Winners	2nd place	3rd place
1961	9 events	Florian Kapała; Stal Rzeszów	Henryk Żyto; Unia Leszno	Marian Kaiser; Legia Gdańsk
1962	8 events	Marian Kaiser; Wybrzeże Gdańsk	Florian Kapała; Stal Rzeszów	Joachim Maj; Górnik Rybnik
1963	6 events	Joachim Maj; Górnik Rybnik	Stanisław Tkocz; Górnik Rybnik	Henryk Żyto; Unia Leszno
1964	7 events	Andrzej Wyglenda; Górnik Rybnik	Andrzej Pogorzelski; Stal Gorzów Wielkopolski	Joachim Maj; Górnik Rybnik
1965	8 events	Stanisław Tkocz; Górnik Rybnik	Andrzej Pogorzelski; Stal Gorzów Wielkopolski	Antoni Woryna; Górnik Rybnik
1966	7 events	Andrzej Pogorzelski; Stal Gorzów Wielkopolski	Paweł Waloszek; Śląsk Świętochłowice	Andrzej Wyglenda; ROW Rybnik
1967	8 events	Antoni Woryna; ROW Rybnik	Henryk Glücklich; Polonia Bydgoszcz	Andrzej Wyglenda; ROW Rybnik
1968	8 events	Paweł Waloszek; Śląsk Świętochłowice	Zygmunt Pytko; Unia Tarnów	Stanisław Tkocz; ROW Rybnik
1969	8 events	Edward Jancarz; Stal Gorzów Wielkopolski	Andrzej Pogorzelski; Stal Gorzów Wielkopolski	Andrzej Wyglenda; ROW Rybnik
1970	8 events	Jan Mucha; Śląsk Świętochłowice	Paweł Waloszek; Śląsk Świętochłowice	Andrzej Wyglenda; ROW Rybnik
1971	7 events	Antoni Woryna; ROW Rybnik	Paweł Waloszek; Śląsk Świętochłowice	Jerzy Szczakiel; Kolejarz Opole
1972	8 events	Edward Jancarz; Stal Gorzów Wielkopolski	Henryk Glücklich; Polonia Bydgoszcz	Marek Cieślak; Włókniarz Częstochowa
1973	8 events	Zenon Plech; Stal Gorzów Wielkopolski	Edward Jancarz; Stal Gorzów Wielkopolski	Jan Mucha; Śląsk Świętochłowice
1974	6 events	Zenon Plech; Stal Gorzów Wielkopolski	Jan Mucha; Śląsk Świętochłowice	Edward Jancarz; Stal Gorzów Wielkopolski
1975	8 events	Edward Jancarz; Stal Gorzów Wielkopolski	Zenon Plech; Stal Gorzów Wielkopolski	Bogusław Nowak; Stal Gorzów Wielkopolski
1976	4 events	Marek Cieślak; Włókniarz Częstochowa	Edward Jancarz; Stal Gorzów Wielkopolski	Jerzy Rembas; Stal Gorzów Wielkopolski
1977	4 events	Jerzy Rembas; Stal Gorzów Wielkopolski	Jan Mucha; Śląsk Świętochłowice	Bogusław Nowak; Stal Gorzów Wielkopolski
1978	Chorzów	Zenon Plech; Wybrzeże Gdańsk	Bolesław Proch; Stal Gorzów Wielkopolski	Andrzej Huszcza; Falubaz Zielona Góra
1979	4 events	Robert Słaboń; Sparta Wrocław	Piotr Pyszny; ROW Rybnik	Mariusz Okoniewski; Unia Leszno
1980	4 events	Robert Słaboń; Sparta Wrocław	Eugeniusz Błaszak; Start Gniezno	Bernard Jąder; Unia Leszno
1981	4 events	Bolesław Proch; Polonia Bydgoszcz	Leonard Raba; Kolejarz Opole	Jan Ząbik; Apator Toruń
1982	Leszno	Roman Jankowski; Unia Leszno	Wojciech Żabiałowicz; Apator Toruń	Mirosław Berliński; Wybrzeże Gdańsk
1983	Leszno	Jan Krzystyniak; Falubaz Zielona Góra	Mirosław Berliński; Wybrzeże Gdańsk	Andrzej Huszcza; Falubaz Zielona Góra
1984	Wrocław	Roman Jankowski; Unia Leszno	Grzegorz Dzikowski; Wybrzeże Gdańsk	Leonard Raba; Kolejarz Opole
1985	3 events	Wojciech Żabiałowicz; Apator Toruń	Mirosław Berliński; Wybrzeże Gdańsk	Maciej Jaworek; Falubaz Zielona Góra
1986	4 events	Roman Jankowski; Unia Leszno	Wojciech Żabiałowicz; Apator Toruń	Andrzej Huszcza; Falubaz Zielona Góra
1987	4 events	Zenon Kasprzak; Unia Leszno	Wojciech Żabiałowicz; Apator Toruń	Roman Jankowski; Unia Leszno
1988	4 events	Piotr Świst; Stal Gorzów Wielkopolski	Jan Krzystyniak; Unia Leszno	Zenon Kasprzak; Unia Leszno
1989	Tarnów, Wrocław	Wojciech Załuski; Kolejarz Opole	Andrzej Huszcza; Falubaz Zielona Góra	Janusz Stachyra; Stal Rzeszów
1990	7 events	Mirosław Korbel; ROW Rybnik	Roman Jankowski; Unia Leszno	Jacek Gomólski; Start Gniezno
1991	Gdańsk, Wrocław	Sławomir Drabik; Włókniarz Częstochowa	Andrzej Huszcza; Morawski Zielona Góra	Piotr Pawlicki, Sr. Unia Leszno
1992	Wrocław	Tomasz Gollob; Polonia Bydgoszcz	Roman Jankowski; Unia Leszno	Krzysztof Kuczwalski; Apator Toruń
1993	Wrocław	Dariusz Śledź; Sparta-Polsat Wrocław	Jerzy Mordel; Motor Lublin	Jan Krzystynial; Stal Rzeszów
1994	Wrocław	Tomasz Gollob; Polonia-Jutrzenka Bydgoszcz	Dariusz Śledź; Sparta-Polsat Wrocław	Jacek Krzyżaniak; Apator-Elektrim Toruń
1995	Wrocław	Tomasz Gollob; Polonia-Jutrzenka Bydgoszcz	Jarosław Olszewski; Wybrzeże-Rafineria Gdańsk	Tomasz Bajerski; Apator-Elektrim Toruń
1996	Wrocław	Jacek Gollob; Polonia-Jutrzenka Bydgoszcz	Tomasz Gollob; Polonia-Jutrzenka Bydgoszcz	Roman Jankowski; Unia Leszno
1997	Wrocław	Tomasz Gollob; Polonia-Jutrzenka Bydgoszcz	Tomasz Bajerski; Stal Gorzów Wielkopolski	Sebastian Ułamek; Włókniarz-Malma Częstochowa
1998	Wrocław	Jacek Gollob; Jutrzenka-Polonia Bydgoszcz	Rafał Dobrucki; Polonia Piła	Piotr Świst; Van-Pur Rzeszów
1999	Wrocław	Jacek Krzyżaniak; Atlas Wrocław	Robert Sawina; Trilux-Start Gniezno	Rafał Dobrucki; Ludwik-Polonia Piła
2000	Wrocław	Tomasz Gollob; Polonia Bydgoszcz	Sebastian Ułamek; Lotos-Wybrzeże Gdańsk	Andrzej Huszcza; ZKŻ Polmos Zielona Góra
2001	Wrocław	Piotr Protasiewicz; Bractwo-Polonia Bydgoszcz	Robert Sawina; Atlas Wrocław	Sebastian Ułamek; Atlas Wrocław
2002	Bydgoszcz	Tomasz Gollob; Point'S-Polonia Bydgoszcz	Jacek Gollob; Point'S-Polonia Bydgoszcz	Piotr Protasiewicz; Point'S-Polonia Bydgoszcz
2003	Wrocław	Rafał Okoniewski; ZKŻ Quick-mix Zielona Góra	Tomasz Jędrzejak; Atlas Wrocław	Jarosław Hampel; Atlas Wrocław
2004	Bydgoszcz	Wiesław Jaguś; Apator-Adriana Toruń	Tomasz Gapiński; Atlas Wrocław	Grzegorz Walasek; Złomrex-Włókniarz Częstochowa
2005	Rybnik	Janusz Kołodziej; Unia Tarnów	Damian Baliński; Unia Leszno	Krzysztof Słaboń; Atlas Wrocław
2006	Częstochowa	Tomasz Gollob; Unia Tarnów	Sebastian Ułamek; Złomrex-Włókniarz Częstochowa	Piotr Protasiewicz; Budlex-Polonia Bydgoszcz
2007	Bydgoszcz	Grzegorz Walasek; Złomrex-Włókniarz Częstochowa	Rafał Dobrucki; Marma Polskie Folie Rzeszów	Krzysztof Kasprzak; Unia Leszno
2008	Rzeszów	Damian Baliński; Unia Leszno	Jarosław Hampel; Unia Leszno	Adrian Miedziński; Unibax Toruń
2009	Zielona Góra held during April 2010	Janusz Kołodziej; Unia Leszno	Piotr Protasiewicz; Falubaz Zielona Góra	Krzysztof Kasprzak; Tauron Azoty Tarnów
2010	Częstochowa	Janusz Kołodziej; Unia Leszno	Adrian Miedziński; Unibax Toruń	Piotr Protasiewicz; Falubaz Zielona Góra
2011	Toruń	Adrian Miedziński; Unibax Toruń	Piotr Protasiewicz; ZKŻ Zielona Góra	Janusz Kołodziej; Unia Leszno
2012	Gorzów Wielkopolski	Piotr Pawlicki Jr. Unia Leszno	Grzegorz Zengota; Włókniarz Częstochowa	Przemysław Pawlicki; Unia Leszno
2013	Rawicz	Maciej Janowski; Unia Tarnów	Adrian Miedziński; Unibax Toruń	Jarosław Hampel; ZKŻ Zielona Góra
2014	Rawicz	Przemysław Pawlicki; Unia Leszno	Kacper Gomólski; Unia Tarnów	Grzegorz Walasek; Włókniarz Częstochowa
2015	Lublin	Przemysław Pawlicki; Unia Leszno	Mirosław Jabłoński; Stal Rzeszów	Piotr Pawlicki Jr. Unia Leszno
2016	Tarnów	Patryk Dudek; ZKŻ Zielona Góra	Bartosz Zmarzlik; Stal Gorzów Wielkopolski	Janusz Kołodziej; Unia Tarnów
2017	Zielona Góra	Przemysław Pawlicki; Stal Gorzów Wielkopolski	Janusz Kołodziej; Unia Leszno	Piotr Pawlicki Jr. Unia Leszno
2018	Piła	Jarosław Hampel; Unia Leszno	Bartosz Zmarzlik; Stal Gorzów Wielkopolski	Janusz Kołodziej; Unia Leszno
2019	Gdańsk	Krzysztof Kasprzak; Stal Gorzów Wielkopolski	Jakub Jamróg; WTS Wrocław	Piotr Protasiewicz; ZKŻ Zielona Góra
2020	Bydgoszcz	Bartosz Zmarzlik; Stal Gorzów Wielkopolski	Paweł Przedpełski; Włókniarz Częstochowa	Krzysztof Kasprzak; Stal Gorzów Wielkopolski
2021	Zielona Góra	Bartosz Zmarzlik; Stal Gorzów Wielkopolski	Janusz Kołodziej; Unia Leszno	Paweł Przedpełski; KS Toruń
2022	Opole	Bartosz Zmarzlik; Stal Gorzów Wielkopolski	Janusz Kołodziej; Unia Leszno	Paweł Przedpełski; KS Toruń
2023	Opole	Maciej Janowski; Wrocław	Bartosz Zmarzlik; Lublin	Piotr Pawlicki Jr. Wrocław
2024	Opole	Dominik Kubera; Lublin	Kacper Woryna; Częstochowa	Przemysław Pawlicki; Zielona Góra
2025	Opole	Bartosz Zmarzlik; Lublin	Mateusz Cierniak; Lublin	Dominik Kubera; Lublin
2026	Opole	Kacper Woryna; Lublin	Dominik Kubera; Zielona Góra	Piotr Pawlicki Jr. Leszno
