= Mateusz Świdnicki =

Polish speedway rider

- Born: 10 August 2001 (age 25); Częstochowa, Poland
- Nationality: Polish

Career history

Poland
- 2018–2022: Częstochowa
- 2023: Krosno
- 2024: Rzeszów
- 2025: Częstochowa

Sweden
- 2022: Dackarna
- 2023: Smederna
- 2023: Örnarna

Individual honours
- 2022: Polish junior champion

Mateusz Świdnicki (born 10 August 2001) is an international speedway rider from Poland.

== Speedway career ==
In 2020, Świdnicki represented Poland in the U19 European Pairs Cup, where he won a bronze medal. On September 7, 2022, he became the Polish Junior Individual Speedway Championship.

In 2022, Świdnicki finished in eighth place during the World Under-21 Championship in the 2022 SGP2, but struggled to find form during the 2023 Polish speedway season.

== Major results ==
=== World individual Championship ===
- 2021 Speedway Grand Prix - 30th
