= Piotr Pawlicki Sr. =

Polish speedway rider

- Born: 29 July 1963 (age 63); Zaborów, Poland
- Nationality: Polish

Career history

Poland
- 1982–1983, 1986–1992: Unia Leszno

Individual honours
- 1983: Polish Junior Champion

Team honours
- 1987, 1988, 1989: Polish League Champion

Piotr Pawlicki Sr. (born 29 July 1963) is a former motorcycle speedway rider from Poland.

== Career ==
Pawlicki came to prominence in 1983, when he won the Polish Junior Individual Speedway Championship.

Pawlicki won a bronze medal in the prestigious Golden Helmet during the 1991 Polish speedway season.

Pawlicki spent his entire career riding for his nearby home club of Unia Leszno, where he won three Polish league championships. He retired after suffering serious lumbar vertebrae and spinal cord injuries during the 1992 Polish Pairs Speedway Championship.

== Family ==
Both of his sons Piotr Jr. and Przemysław were professional speedway riders.
