= Stadion OSiR Skałka =

Multi-use stadium in Świętochłowice, Poland

Skalka Stadium
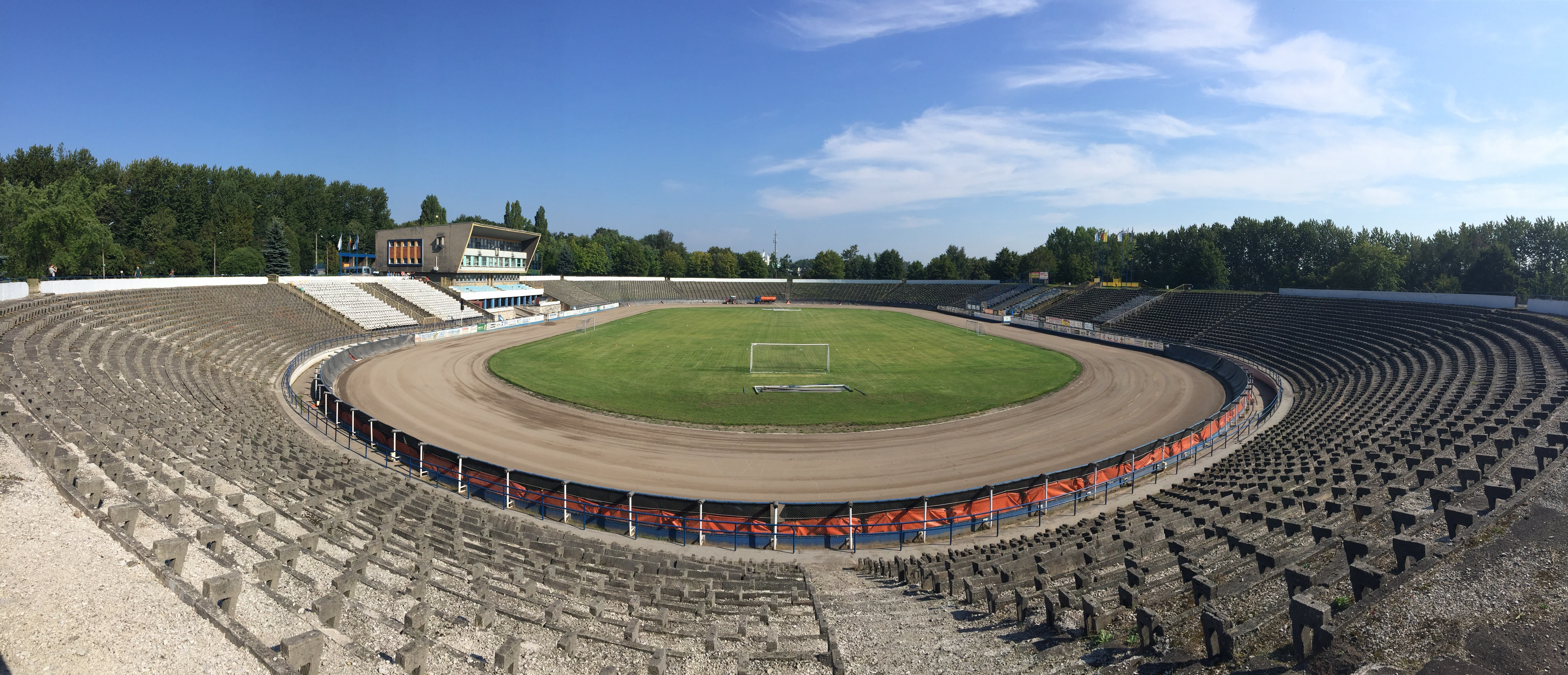
- Panoramic view, 2016
- Location: Bytomska 40, 41-608 Świętochłowice, Poland
- Coordinates: 50°18′04″N 18°55′12″E
- Capacity: 26,000
- Operator: association football motorcycle speedway
- Opened: 1 June 1979
- Length: 0.373 km (0.232 mi)
- Race lap record: 67.07 sec (Dawid Lampart, 17 July 201)

Stadion Skałka im. Pawła Waloszka, Paweł Waloszek Skałka Stadium is a motorcycle speedway and association football stadium located in the centre of Świętochłowice off the Bytomska 40 road. It is part of the Skałka Sports and Recreation Center. The Polish sports club Śląsk Świętochłowice uses the stadium. This consists of a football team and speedway club.

== History ==
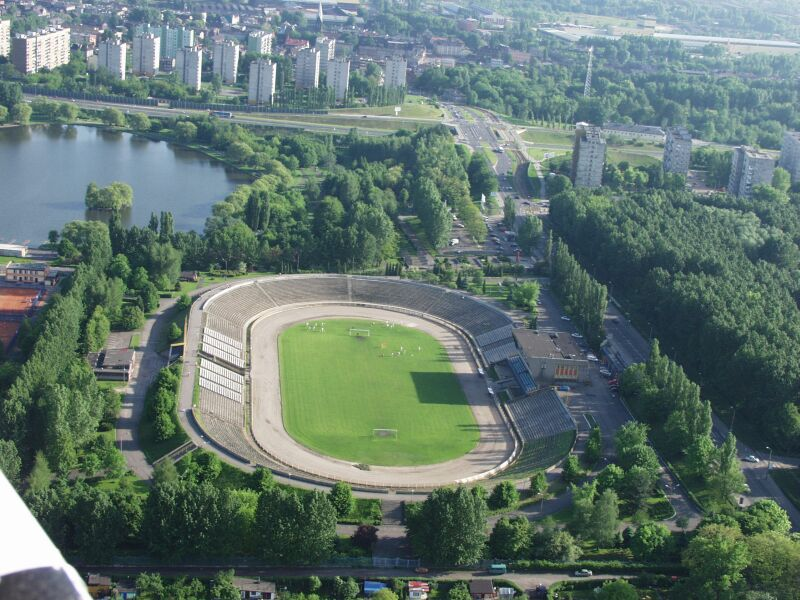
Aerial view in 2010

The stadium was built in the second half of the 1970s on a waste dump. It was officially opened on 1 June 1979 and on 22 June 1979, a record attendance of 27,000 people.

In April 2005, during a mass for John Paul II, nearly 20,000 people gathered at the stadium.

In October 2014, the stadium was renamed to the Paweł Waloszek Stadium.

In February 2023, the stadium began reconstruction.
