= Jan Krzystyniak =

Polish speedway rider (born 1958)

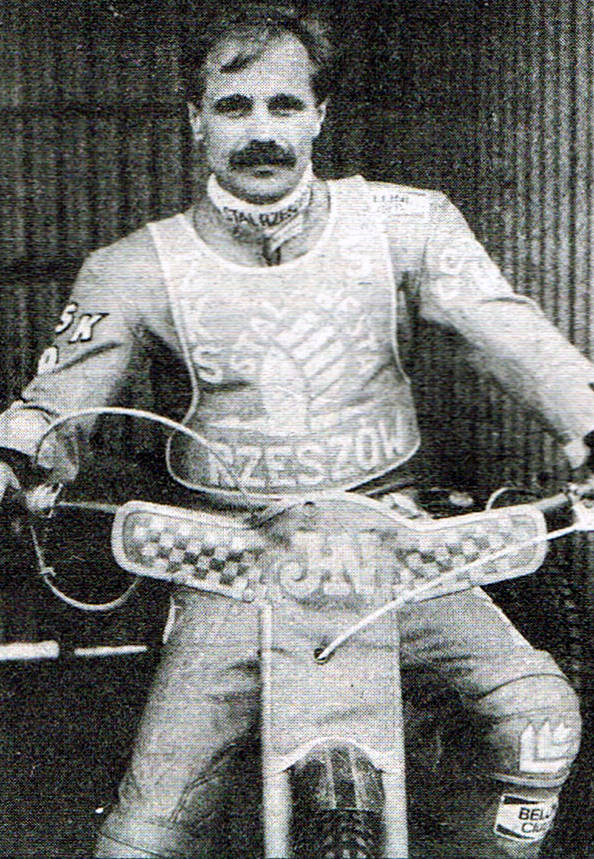
- Born: 14 March 1958 (age 68); Zielona Góra, Poland
- Nationality: Polish

Career history
- 1978–1985: ZKŻ Zielona Góra
- 1987–1988: Unia Leszno
- 1989–1993: Stal Rzeszów
- 1994–1997: Polonia Pila
- 1998: KM Ostrów Wielkopolski

Individual honours
- 1983: Golden Helmet
- 1988, 1999: Alfred Smoczyk Memorial

Team honours
- 1981, 1982, 1985, 1987, 1988: Team Speedway Polish Championship
- 1982, 1983, 1987, 1988: Polish Pairs Speedway Championship

Jan Krzystyniak (born 14 March 1958) is a Polish former motorcycle speedway rider and speedway team manager.

== Career ==
Krzystyniak received his speedway license in 1978, following the steps of his brother Alfred. Until 1985 he rode for ZKŻ Zielona Góra, then he moved on to Unia Leszno (1986–1988), Stal Rzeszów (1989–1993, Polonia Piła (1994–1997) and Iskra Ostrów Wielkopolski (1998). Krzystyniak won 10 medals at Team Speedway Polish Championship: five golden (1981, 1982, 1985, 1987, 1988), one silver (1984) and four bronze medals (1979, 1986, 1996, 1997). During his career, he was victorious at Polish Pairs Speedway Championship four times, he also came second in the Polish Individual Speedway Championship twice (1988, 1989).

Krzystyniak was very successful at many Polish individual tournaments:

- Golden Helmet – 1st place (1983), 2nd (1988), 3rd (1993),
- Bronislaw Idzikowski and Marek Czerny Memorial – 1st place (1983), 2nd (1989),
- Łańcuch Herbowy of the city of Ostrów Wielkopolski – 1st place (1985), 2nd (1984),
- Alfred Smoczyk Memorial – 1st place (1988, 1989)
- Eugeniusz Nazimek Memorial – 1st place (1987, 1990, 1992, 1993), 2nd place (1988, 1991),
- Mieczysław Połukard Criterium of Polish Speedway Leagues Aces – 2nd place (1991,1992).

Following his retirement as a speedway rider, Krzystyniak was appointed team manager of Unia Leszno, Włókniarz Częstochowa i Start Gniezno

== Sources ==
- Jan Krzystyniak | Polish Speedway Database [Retrieved 2013-01-21]
