= Polish Automobile and Motorcycle Federation =

Polski Związek Motorowy
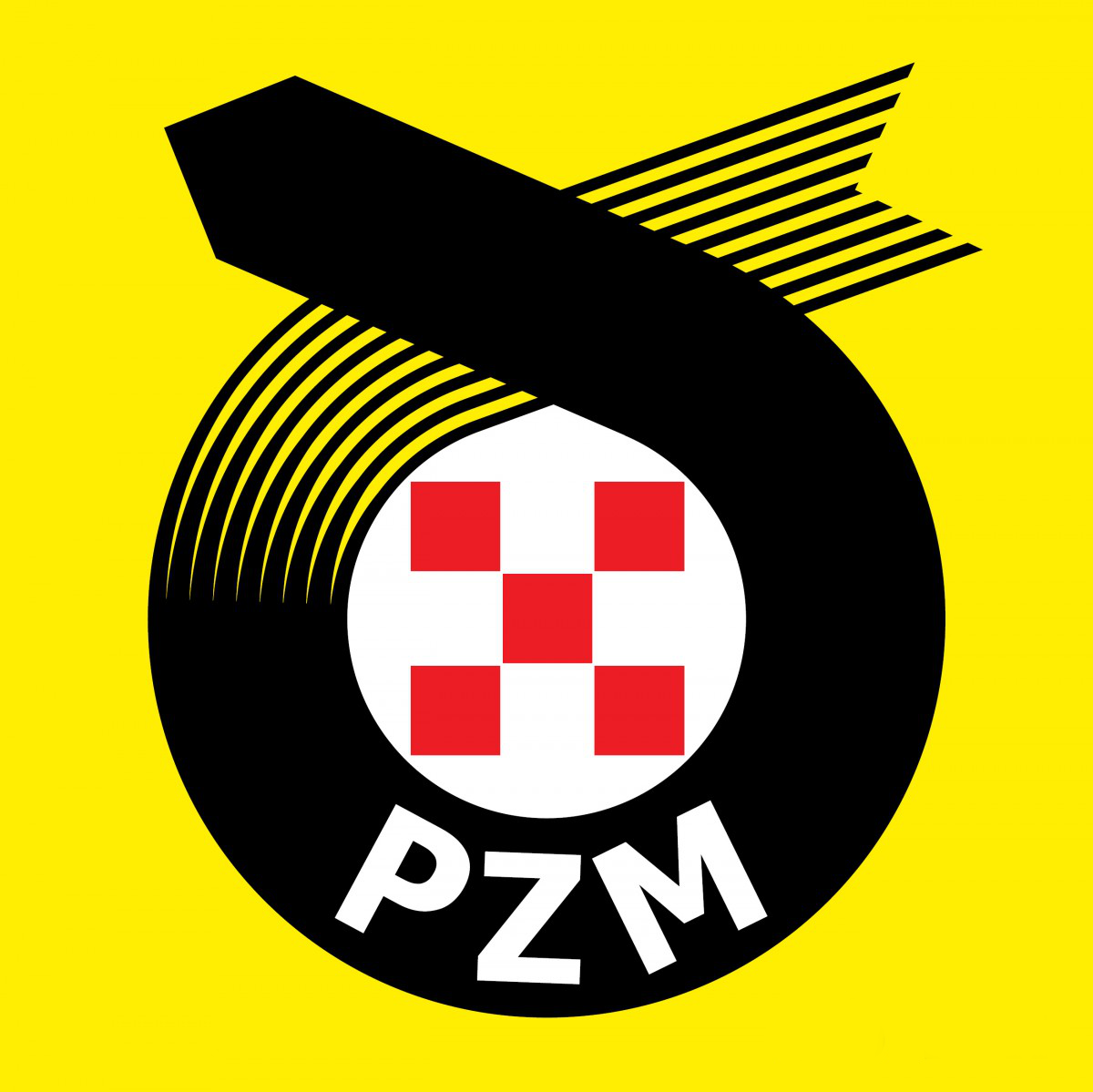
- Old Logo

- Sport: Motorsport
- Jurisdiction: Poland
- Abbreviation: PZM
- Founded: 1909/1950
- Affiliation: FIA, FIM
- Headquarters: Warsaw
- President: Michał Sikora, Prezes
- Replaced: Polish Car Club, Polish Motorcycle Association

Official website
- www.pzm.pl
- (Poland)

The Polish Automobile and Motorcycle Federation (Polish: Polski Związek Motorowy; PZM, PZMot) is an automobile club and the governing body of motorsports in Poland. It is based in Warsaw.

Established in 1950 by merging the Polish Car Club and the Polish Motorcycle Association. According to its charter, the PZM deals with propagation of knowledge and motor cultures, it leads operations in favor of safety in road traffic, and it promotes motor tourism and camping, as well as supporting the antique vehicle hobby. It organizes driving schools, it provides assistance for motorists in cases of break-downs, it inspects repair garages and service stations, it is involved in sales of new and used cars, it acts as an agent for vehicle insurance policies, as well as issuing some travel documents, providing information for tourists, booking of hotels and ferry tickets.

Besides the automobile club functions, PZM is the Polish National Federation for Motor Sports and is a member of:

- FIA - International Automobile Federation
- FIM - International Motorcycling Federation
- Fédération Internationale de Camping et de Caravanning
- Fédération Internationale Véhicules Anciens
- UEM - European Motorcycle Union.

== PZM's Commissions and Groups ==
- Main Commission of Automobile Sport (GKSS)
- Main Commission of Motorcycle Sport (GKSM)
- Main Commission of Speedway Sport (GKSŻ)
- Main Commission of Karting Sport (GKSK)
- Main Commission of Traffic Security and Environment Protection (GKBRDiOŚ)
- Main Commission of Popular Sports and Tourism (GKSPiT)
- Main Commission of Classic Cars (GKPZ)
- Commission of Caravanning and Camping
- Group of Expertise
- Group of Tracks (ZT)
- Group of Awards and Decorations
- Promotion Group (ZP)
- Medical Group (ZM)

== Sports ==
=== Speedway ===
Polski Związek Motorowy organizes:

- the Polish speedway championships:
  - Individual Speedway Polish Championship
  - Individual Speedway Junior Polish Championship
  - Polish Pairs Speedway Championship
  - Polish Pairs Speedway Junior Championship
  - Team Speedway Polish Championship
  - Team Speedway Junior Polish Championship
- the Helmets competitions:
  - Golden Helmet
  - Silver Helmet
  - Bronze Helmet
- and Polish national speedway teams.

In the past, PZMot was organizes Individual Speedway Polish Cup and Team Speedway Polish Cup.

== Research ==
As well as being an active automobile association PZM also undertakes road safety research. PZM is the active member for the European Road Assessment Programme (EuroRAP) in Poland. PZM regularly publishes maps showing the risk of being involved in an accident on Poland's roads.

== Campaigning for Safe Road Design ==
The European Campaign for Safe Road Design is a partnership between 28 major European road safety stakeholders that is calling for the EC to invest in safe road infrastructure initiatives which could cut deaths on European roads by 33% in less than a decade. PZM is the campaign's partner in Poland.

== See also ==
- List of FIM affiliated federations
