= GKM Grudziądz =

Polish motorcycle speedway team

Club information
- Track address: Grudziądz Speedway Stadium, ul. Hallera 4 Grudziądz
- Country: Poland
- Founded: 1976
- Team manager: Janusz Ślączka
- League: Ekstraliga
- Website: Official website

Club facts
- Colours: Yellow and Blue
- Track size: 355 m
- Track record time: 64.86 seconds
- Track record date: 8 September 2020
- Track record holder: Artem Laguta

Major team honours
Team Speedway Polish Championship bronze medal	1948
Second division	1997
2.Liga	2003
Pairs champions	2021

GKM Grudziądz is a Polish motorcycle speedway team based in Grudziądz. They race at the 8,000-capacity Grudziądz Speedway Stadium. The team currently competes in the Ekstraliga (the highest division) and have won the bronze medal in the Team Speedway Polish Championship once (as of 2022).

== History ==
=== 1948 to 1950 ===
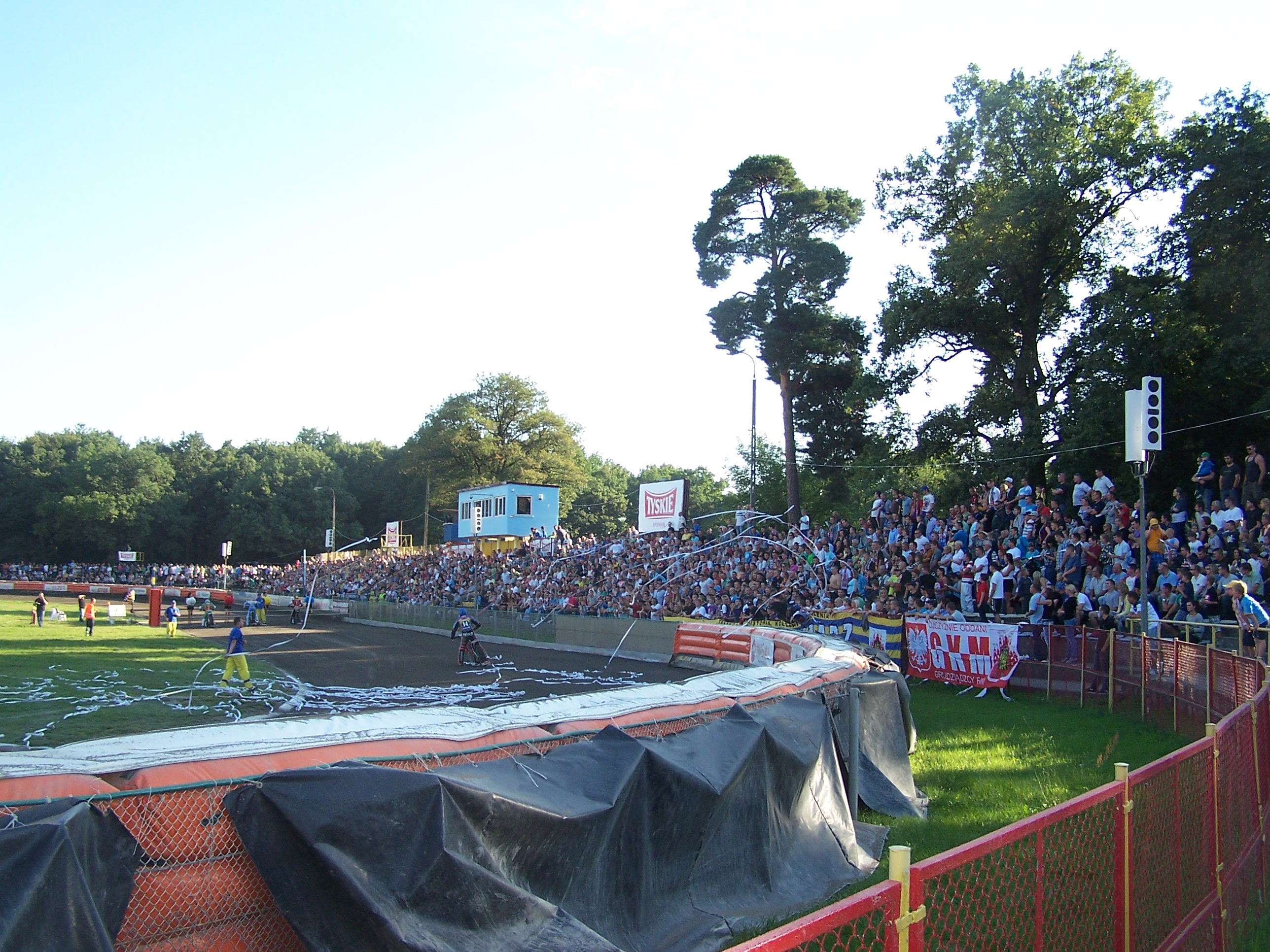
GKM fans during a home match with Start Gniezno in 2011

The club's predecessor was Olimpia Grudziądz, which competed in the inaugural 1948 Polish speedway season and won the bronze medal. The Olimpia motorcycle club had been established in 1924. In 1949, they competed as Olimpia-Unia Grudziądz and in 1950 as Unia Grudziądz. The 1950 season would be the last season for the team for nearly three decades.

=== 1977 to 1994 ===
The current club was founded in 1976 as GSŻ (Grudziądzka Sekcja Żużlowa). Speedway returned to Grudziądz during the 1977 Polish speedway season as GSŻ Grudziądz that entered the Second division. The team was consisted mainly of riders from Stal KS Toruń that had failed to make the Torun first team. In 1980, the team was renamed to GKM Grudziądz, which stands for Grudziądzki Klub Motocyklowy ("Grudziądz Motorcycling Club"). For 18 years the team remained in the second division starved of any success.

=== 1995 to 2001 ===
The club finally experienced the first league in 1996 after gaining promotion in 1995 but unfortunately suffered immediate relegation despite the signing of Billy Hamill, who would become the world champion the same year. However, the team were performing much better than in previous years and won their first honour by winning the second division in 1997; Hamill spearheaded the team and was supported by Hungarian Zoltán Adorján.

Following the creation of the Ekstraliga in 2000 and the reorganisation of the leagues, Grudziądz found themselves in the Polish 1.Liga and at the end of the 2001 season the club was liquidated.

=== 2002 to 2012 ===
In 2002, speedway quickly returned with a team called GTŻ Grudziądz but the team were relegated to 2.Liga. However, they began their recovery by winning 2.Liga on 2003. In 2012, the club won a bronze medal in the Polish Pairs Speedway Championship.

=== 2013 to present ===
In 2013, the club was renamed GKM Grudziądz SA. In 2015 and 2016, they competed in the Ekstraliga by default (due to the financial misfortune of other clubs) and have remained in the top division since (as of 2023). Przemysław Pawlicki and Krzysztof Kasprzak won the Pairs championship in 2021.

== Previous teams ==
Extended content

2022 team

- (Poland) Krzysztof Kasprzak
- (Poland) Seweryn Orgacki
- (Denmark) Frederik Jakobsen
- (Poland) Przemysław Pawlicki
- (Poland) Kacper Pludra
- (Poland) Wiktor Rafalski
- (Poland) Norbert Krakowiak
- (Denmark) Nicki Pedersen

2023 team

- (Denmark) Nicki Pedersen
- (Australia) Max Fricke
- (Poland) / (Russia) Gleb Chugunov
- (Denmark) Frederik Jakobsen
- (Poland) Kacper Pludra
- (Poland) Mateusz Szczepaniak
- (Poland) Norbert Krakowiak
- (Poland) Kacper Lobdzinski
- (Poland) Seweryn Orgacki
- (Poland) Wiktor Rafalski
- (Poland) / (Russia) Vadim Tarasenko

== Notable riders ==
- (Hungary) Zoltán Adorján
- (Poland) Krzysztof Buczkowski
- (Poland) Robert Dados
- (Australia) Max Fricke
- (Poland) Tomasz Gollob
- (United States) Billy Hamill
- (Denmark) Michael Jepsen Jensen
- (Poland) Krzysztof Kasprzak
- (Poland) Robert Kempiński
- (Poland) Norbert Kościuch
- (Russia) Artem Laguta
- (Sweden) Antonio Lindbäck
- (Poland) Jan Malinowski
- (Poland) Przemysław Pawlicki
- (Denmark) Nicki Pedersen
- (Poland) Paweł Staszek

== Honours ==
Competitions	Total	Golden medals		Silver medals		Bronze medals
Competitions	Total	Total	Years	Total	Years	Total	Years
Team (DMP) (since 1948)	0
Team U-21 (MDMP) (since 1978)	3	1	1997	1	1991	1	1998
Pairs (MPPK) (since 1974)	0
Pairs U-21 (MMPPK) (1980 U-23; since 1983)	0
Individual (IMP) (since 1948)	0
Individual U-21 (MIMP) (since 1967)	3	1	1998	1	1985	1	1995
Total Polish Championship medals: 6		Gold: 2		Silver: 2		Bronze: 2
Competitions	Total	I place		II place		III place
Competitions	Total	Total	Years	Total	Years	Total	Years
European Club (KPE) (since 1998)	0
Team Cup (DPP) (?)	0
Golden Helmet (ZK) (since 1961)	0
Silver Helmet U-21 (SK) (since 1966)	0
Bronze Helmet U-19 (BK) (1976-81; since 1983)	2	1	2008			1	2004
