= Zenon Kasprzak =

Polish speedway rider

- Born: 10 May 1962 (age 64); Poniec, Poland
- Nationality: Polish

Career history
- 1980-1993: Unia Leszno
- 1994-1995: Polonia Piła
- 1996-1998: Kolejarz Rawicz
- 1999: Śląsk Świętochłowice
- 2000: Ostrów Wielkopolski

Individual honours
- 1988: Speedway World Championship finalist
- 1990: Polish Champion
- 1987: Poland Golden Helmet Winner

Team honours
- 1987, 1988, 1989: Polish League Champion

Zenon Kasprzak (born 10 May 1962) is a former international speedway rider from Poland.

== Speedway career ==
Kasprzak reached the final of the Speedway World Championship in the 1988 Individual Speedway World Championship. He won the Continental Speedway final leading up to the world final.

Kasprzak rode in the top tier of Polish Speedway from 1980-2000, riding for various clubs.

== World final appearances ==
=== Individual World Championship ===
- 1988 - (Denmark) Vojens, Speedway Center - 14th - 3pts

=== World Team Cup ===
- 1984 - (Poland) Leszno (with Roman Jankowski / Zenon Plech / Leonard Raba / Boleslaw Proch) - 4th - 8pt (1)
