= Wojciech Żabiałowicz =

Polish speedway rider

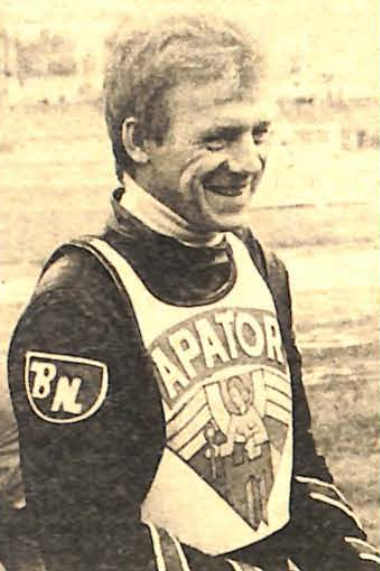
- Born: 16 October 1957 (age 69); Toruń, Poland
- Nationality: Polish

Career history
- 1977–1991: Apator Toruń

Individual honours
- 1987: Polish Champion
- 1985: Poland Golden Helmet Winner

Team honours
- 1986, 1990: Polish League Champion

Wojciech Żabiałowicz (born 16 October 1957) is a former international speedway rider from Poland.

== Career ==
Żabiałowicz was the champion of Poland, winning the Polish Individual Speedway Championship in 1987.

Żabiałowicz rode in the Team Speedway Polish Championship for Apator Toruń from 1977 to 1991.

In 2018, Żabiałowicz turned down the chance to coach Motor Lublin.

== World Final appearances ==
=== World Pairs Championship ===
- 1987 - (Czech Republic) Pardubice, Svítkov Stadion (with Roman Jankowski) - 9th - 14pts (8)
