= Roman Jankowski =

Polish speedway rider

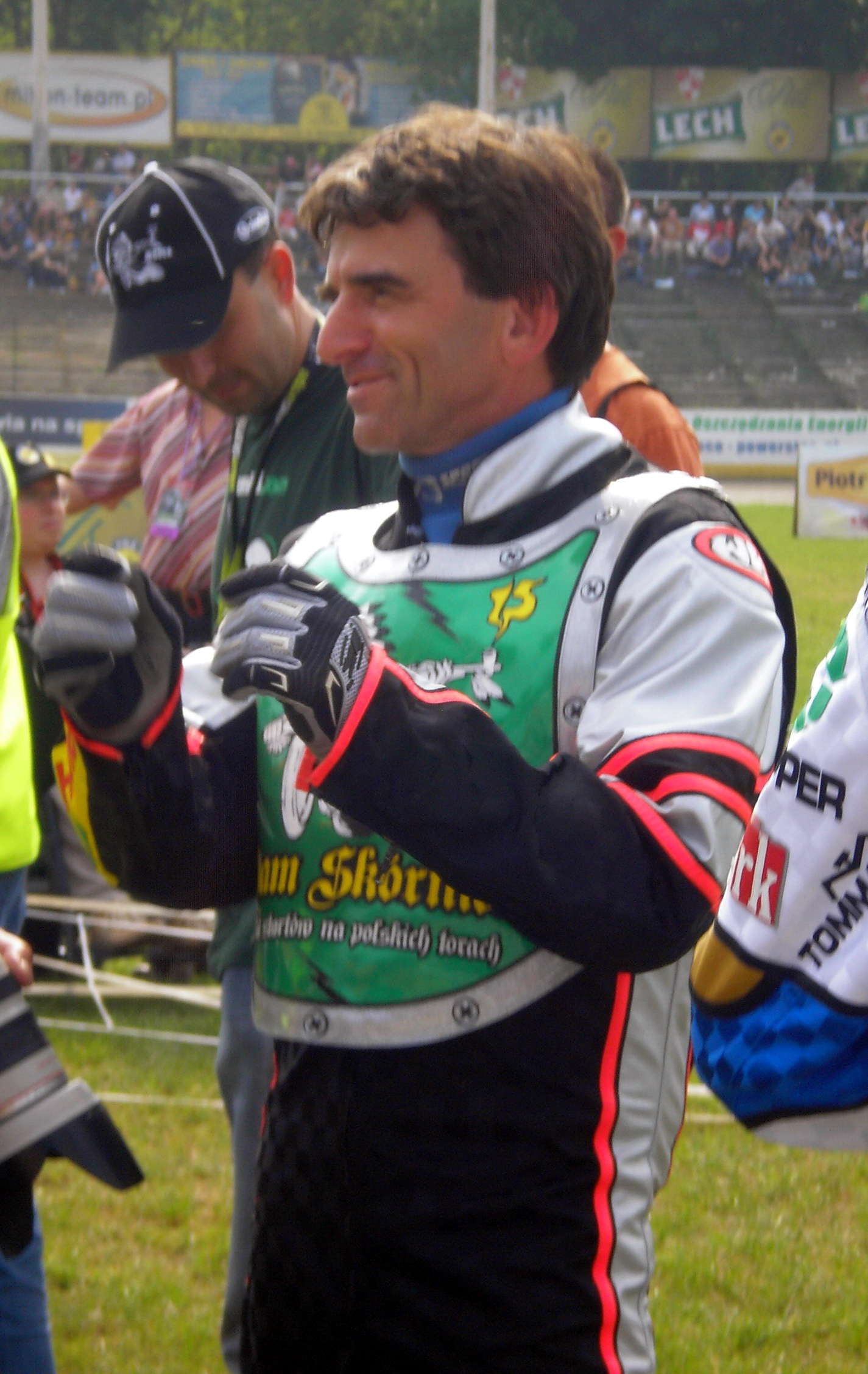
- Born: 5 October 1957 (age 69); Kościan, Poland
- Nationality: Polish

Career history

Poland
- 1976–2001: Unia Leszno
- 2002–2003: Warszawa

Great Britain
- 1980–1981: Hackney Hawks

Individual honours
- 1981, 1988: Polish Champion
- 1982, 1984, 1986: Poland Golden Helmet Winner
- 1979: Poland Silver Helmet Winner

Team honours
- 1979, 1980, 1987, 1988, 1989: Polish League Champion

Roman Jankowski (born 5 October 1957 in Kościan, Poland) is a former motorcycle speedway rider. He earned 47 international caps for the Poland speedway team and was twice champion of Poland.

== Career ==
Jankowski rode from 1976 until 2006. He won the Polish Championship, title twice, in 1981 and again in 1988.

Jankowski has also represented Poland at the World Team Cup.

Jankowski rode for the Hackney Hawks in 1980 and 1981.

Jankowski is currently the youth coach and manager of Unia Leszno.

== Personal life ==
Jankowski's three sons, Łukasz, Marcin and Norbert are all speedway riders.

== World final appearances ==
=== Individual World Championship ===
- 1987 - (Netherlands) Amsterdam, Olympic Stadium - 14th - 8pts
- 1988 - (Denmark) Vojens, Speedway Center - 16th -2pts
- 1994 - (Denmark) Vojens, Speedway Center - Reserve - 0pts

=== World Team Cup ===
- 1980 - (Poland) Wrocław, Olympic Stadium (with Zenon Plech / Andrzej Huszcza / Edward Jancarz / Jerzy Rembas) - 3rd - 15pt (5)
- 1984 - (Poland) Leszno (with Zenon Plech / Zenon Kasprzak / Leonard Raba / Boleslaw Proch) - 4th - 8pt (1)

=== World Pairs Championship ===
- 1987 - (Czech Republic) Pardubice, Svítkov Stadion (with Wojciech Żabiałowicz) - 9th - 14pts (6)
