= Motor Lublin (speedway team) =

Polish speedway club

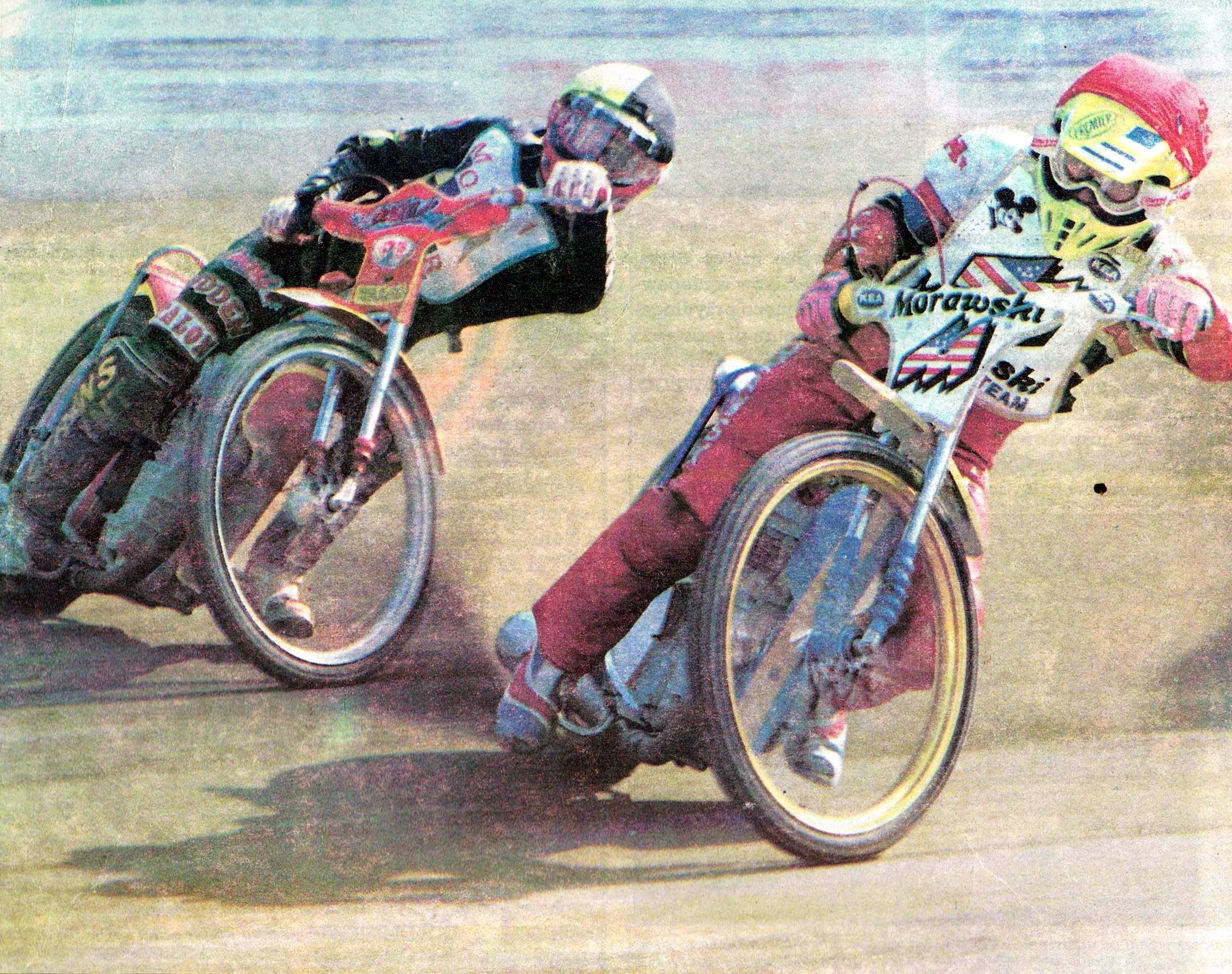
- Leigh Adams of Lublin (left) in a match against Zielona Góra in 1991

Club information
- Track address: Stadion MOSiR Bystrzyca; Lublin
- Country: Poland
- Founded: 1956
- Closed: 2015

Club facts
- Colours: Yellow, White and Blue
- Track size: 388 metres (1,273 ft)

Major team honours
Team Speedway Polish Championship silver medal	1991
Polish second tier champions	1976, 1982, 1989
2.Liga champions	2002

Motor Lublin was the name given to several Polish motorcycle speedway teams that existed in the city of Lublin in Poland. In 2017, a new team called Klub Motorowy Cross Lublin was founded and is the current team competing in the Polish leagues from Lublin.

== Early history ==
Speedway racing in Lublin first took place on 21 September 1947, when Lubelski Klub Motocyklowy organised a friendly tournament. In 1948, local activists led an initiative to build a speedway track. The team's first recorded league match occurred on 18 April 1956.

== 1956 to 1958 ==
During the 1956 Polish speedway season a Lublin team called Liga Przyjaciół Żołnierza (LPZ) participated in the South Group of the second league, finishing fourth. The following season in 1957, they were relegated to the third league. after just one season in the third league (1958) the club was dissolved.

== 1962 to 1989 ==
A newly established club named Motor Lublin were formed to compete in the 1962 Polish speedway season. The club competed in the second league for 18 consecutive unremarkable years managing no higher than third place in that time. In 1976, the team won their first honour when they finally won the Second League during the 1976 Polish speedway season and Zygmunt Studziński finished fifth in the Golden Helmet. The club were relegated the following season but were one of the stronger teams in the second league during the period. In 1980, Marek Kępa won the bronze medal in the Golden Helmet.

In 1982, the club won their second tier 2 title but suffered relegation again during their return season in the top league. In 1989, the club led by Marek Kępa again, won the second league for the third time in their history.

== 1990 to 1995 ==
The club finally survived a season in the top league during 1990 and made some significant signings, including the 3-times world champion Hans Nielsen, Dariusz Śledź and Czech Antonín Kasper Jr. The team won the silver medal in the Team Speedway Polish Championship the following season during the 1991 Polish speedway season. The team enjoyed some excellent seasons during the early 1990s and Jerzy Model won the silver medal in the 1993 Golden Helmet and top Australian Leigh Adams rode for the club. However, the club finished bottom of the table in 1995 and were subsequently dissolved .

== 1996 to 2000 ==
A new club was quickly founded to compete during the 1996 season under the name LKŻ Lublin. The name lasted for five seasons from 1996 to 2000 and they competed in the second league until 2000. In 2000, they found themselves in the lowest division called the 2.Liga following the introduction of the Ekstraliga.

== 2001 to 2007 ==
The team reformed as Towarzystwo Żużloweas Lublin (TŻ Lublin) in 2001. In their season under this form they won promotion to the second tier but were relegated at the end of the 2007 season. This turned out to be their last season under this name.

== 2008 to 2015 ==
The club was reformed once again in 2009, this time known as KMŻ Lublin. After a year's absence of speedway in the city (except for a team competing in the amateur league they competed in 2.Liga. They won promotion to the second tier in 2011 but suffered relegation in 2014. For the 2015 season the club was renamed KMŻ Motor Lublin to return to the historic name that the fans still identified with, but after just one more season the club disbanded again.

== Notable riders ==
- (Australia) Leigh Adams
- (Czech Republic) Antonín Kasper
- (Poland) Marek Kępa
- (Denmark) Hans Nielsen
- (Poland) Dariusz Śledź

== See also ==
- KM Cross Lublin (speedway team)
