= Kolejarz Opole =

Motorcycle speedway club

Club information
- Track address: Marian Spychała Speedway Stadium ul. Wschodnia 2; 45-233 Opole
- Country: Poland
- Founded: 1957
- Team manager: Marcin Sekula
- League: 2. Liga
- Website: Official Website

Club facts
- Track size: 321 metres (351 yd)
- Track record time: 59.39
- Track record date: 18 April 2022
- Track record holder: Bartosz Zmarzlik

Major team honours
Team Speedway Polish Championship bronze medal	1970
1. Liga champions	1969, 1974, 1980, 1987
2. Liga champions	2004

Kolejarz Opole (Railwayman Opole) is a motorcycle speedway team based in Opole, Poland. They currently race in the Polish Speedway Second League (2. Liga).

== History ==
The club race at the Marian Spychała Speedway Stadium (Polish: Stadion im. Mariana Spychały w Opolu) or full name Mariana Spychała Municipal Speedway Stadium, named after a former rider and coach Marian Spychała. The speedway track was constructed in 1957.

On 5 April 1957, the speedway club was officially founded as Klub Sportowy Kolejarz Opole and made its debut in the Polish leagues in 1961. The club's first honour was winning the Polish Speedway First League in 1969 and they went on to win the league three more times in 1974, 1980, 1987.

After their 1969 victory they competed in the highest league and won the bronze medal in 1970.

In 1989, Wojciech Załuski won the Golden Helmet.

From 1994 to 1997 the club raced as CemWap Opole named after their sponsor the CemWap cement and lime company. The club experienced problems shortly afterwards and disbanded but reformed as Towarzystwo Żużlowe Opole, sponsored by Noban. They competed as Noban from 1999 until 2002.

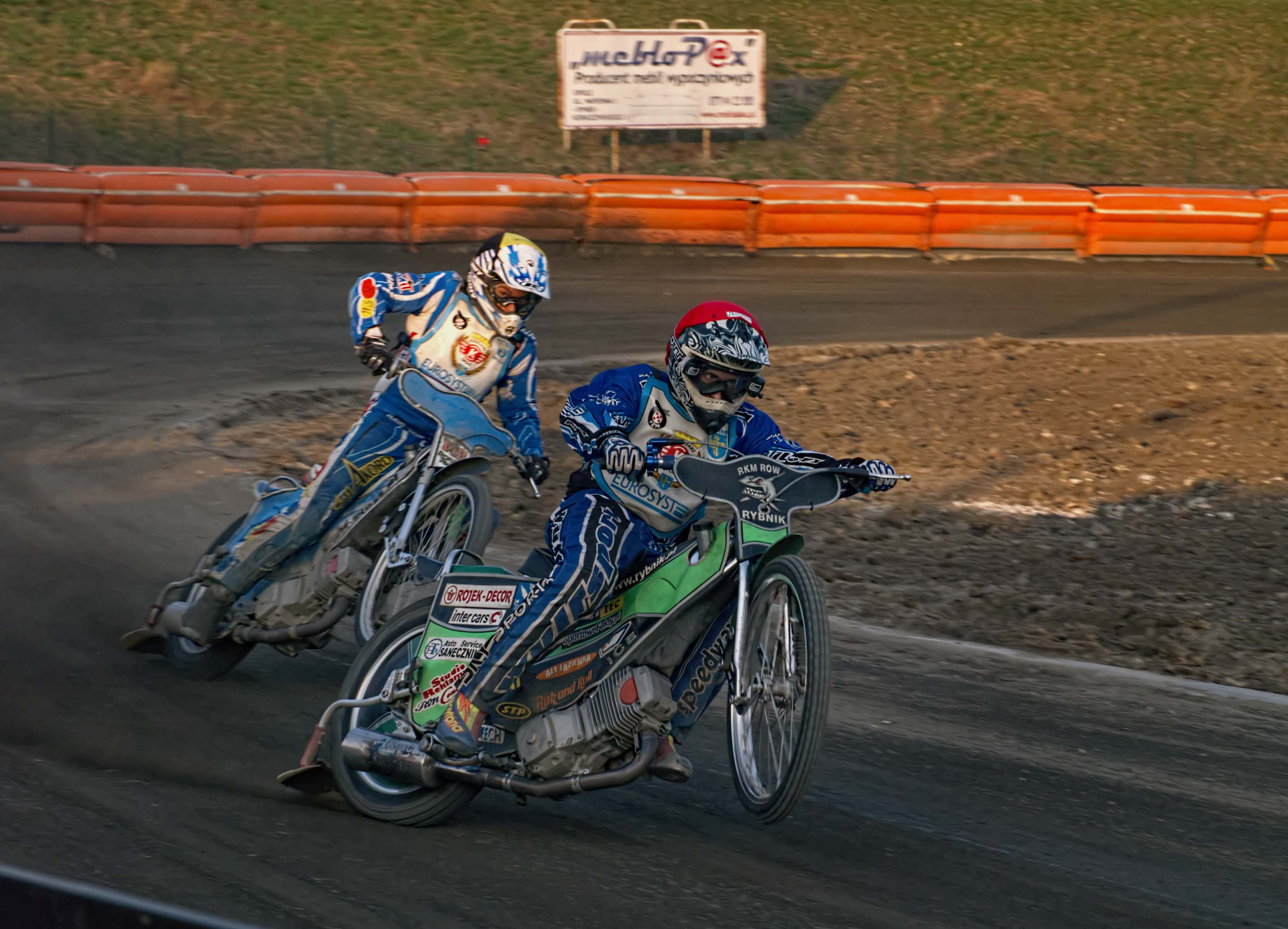
Opole versus Rawicz in 2010

The club later won the 2.Liga in 2004.

== Notable riders ==
- (Poland) Wojciech Załuski
