= 1983 Polish speedway season =

Motorcycle racing competition

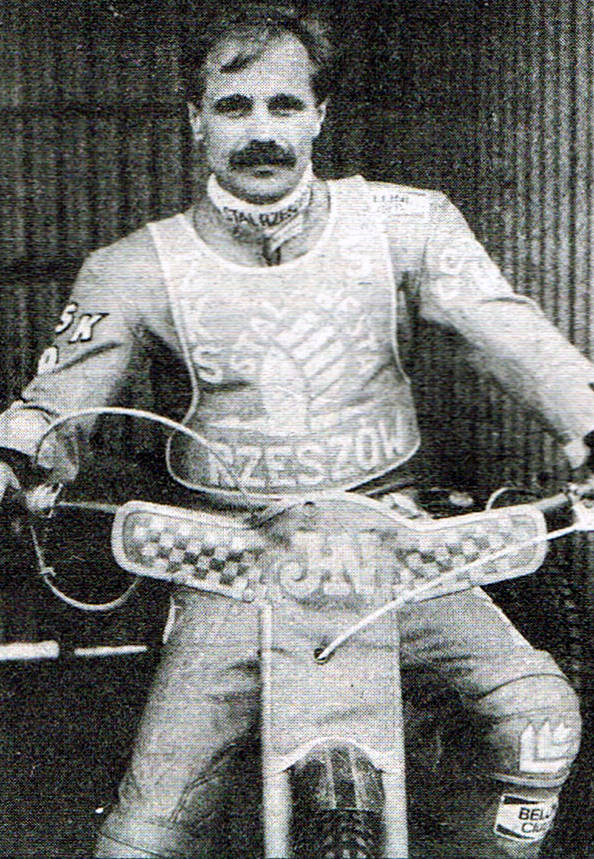
- Jan Krzystyniak, 1983 Golden Helmet winner

The 1983 Polish Speedway season was the 1983 season of motorcycle speedway in Poland.

== Individual ==
=== Polish Individual Speedway Championship ===
The 1983 Individual Speedway Polish Championship final was held on 22 July at Gdańsk.

Pos.	Rider	Club	Total	Points
1	Edward Jancarz	Gorzów Wlkp.	13	(3,2,3,3,2)
2	Zenon Plech	Gdańsk	12 +3	(3,3,3,3,d)
3	Andrzej Huszcza	Zielona Góra	12 +2	(2,2,2,3,3)
4	Bolesław Proch	Bydgoszcz	11	(3,1,2,2,3)
5	Piotr Pyszny	Rybnik	11	(1,3,3,2,2)
6	Mirosław Berliński	Gdańsk	10	(3,1,3,3,0)
7	Bogusław Nowak	Gorzów Wlkp.	9	(1,3,1,2,2)
8	Włodzimierz Heliński	Leszno	8	(1,1,1,2,3)
9	Wojciech Żabiałowicz	Toruń	8	(2,2,2,1,1)
10	Jerzy Rembas	Gorzów Wlkp.	6	(0,3,0,0,3)
11	Grzegorz Kuźniar	Rzeszów	5	(2,u,1,d,2)
12	Ryszard Czarnecki	Rzeszów	5	(0,2,1,1,1)
13	Kazimierz Wójcik	Gniezno	3	(1,2,d,0,–)
14	Eugeniusz Błaszak	Gniezno	2	(2,u,–,–,–)
15	Grzegorz Sterna	Leszno	2	(1,0,0,1,0)
16	Janusz Stachyra	Rzeszów	1	(0,0,d,u,1)
17	Roman Jankowski	Leszno	0	(u,–,–,–,–)
18	Jan Krzystyniak	Zielona Góra	0	(w,–,–,–,–)
19	Andrzej Marynowski (res)	Gdańsk	1	(0,1)
20	Bogdan Skrobisz (res)	Gdańsk	1	(1)

=== Golden Helmet ===
The 1983 Golden Golden Helmet (Polish: Turniej o Złoty Kask, ZK) organised by the Polish Motor Union (PZM) was the 1983 event for the league's leading riders. The final was held on 15 September at Leszno.

Pos.	Rider	Club	Total	Points
1	Jan Krzystyniak	Zielona Góra	14	(2,3,3,3,3)
2	Mirosław Berliński	Gdańsk	13	(3,3,1,3,3)
3	Andrzej Huszcza	Zielona Góra	12	(3,2,3,2,2)
4	Edward Jancarz	Gorzów Wlkp.	10	(3,3,2,1,1)
5	Bolesław Proch	Bydgoszcz	9	(0,2,2,3,2)
6	Jerzy Rembas	Gorzów Wlkp.	8	(0,3,1,1,3)
7	Leonard Raba	Opole	8	(3,1,1,1,2)
8	Eugeniusz Miastkowski	Toruń	7	(2,1,2,2,1)
9	Maciej Jaworek	Zielona Góra	7	(1,0,3,3,0)
10	Czesław Piwosz	Leszno	7	(1,2,0,1,3)
11	Grzegorz Sterna	Leszno	7	(1,1,2,2,1)
12	Ryszard Czarnecki	Rzeszów	6	(2,0,3,0,1)
13	Wojciech Żabiałowicz	Toruń	4	(2,2,0,0,w)
14	Bogusław Nowak	Gorzów Wlkp.	4	(1,0,1,2,0)
15	Marek Kępa	Lublin	2	(d,d,0,0,2)
16	Grzegorz Kuźniar	Rzeszów	1	(d,1,d,0,0)
17	Antoni Skupień (res)	Rybnik		(ns)
18	Bernard Jąder (res)	Leszno		(ns)

=== Junior Championship ===
- winner - Piotr Pawlicki, Sr.

=== Silver Helmet ===
- winner - Wojciech Załuski

=== Bronze Helmet ===
- winner - Ryszard Franczyszyn

== Pairs ==
=== Polish Pairs Speedway Championship ===
The 1983 Polish Pairs Speedway Championship was the 1983 edition of the Polish Pairs Speedway Championship. The final was held on 10 August at Zielona Góra.

Pos	Team	Pts	Riders
1	Falubaz Zielona Góra	27	Andrzej Huszcza 15, Jan Krzystyniak 12
2	Śląsk Świętochłowice	21	Jerzy Kochan 11, Krzysztof Zarzecki 10
3	Stal Gorzów Wlkp.	19+3	Edward Jancarz 9, Jerzy Rembas 5, Bogusław Nowak 5+3
4	Unia Leszno	19+2	Grzegorz Sterna 9, Zenon Kasprzak 9, Włodzimierz Heliński 1+2
5	Kolejarz Opole	14	Herbert Karwat 10, Leonard Raba 0, Franciszek Stach 4
6	Wybrzeże Gdańsk	13	Dariusz Stenka 4, Mirosław Berliński 7, Piotr Żyto 2
7	Apator Toruń	12	Wojciech Żabiałowicz 8, Eugeniusz Miastkowski 4, Jan Woźnicki 0

== Team ==
=== Team Speedway Polish Championship ===
The 1983 Team Speedway Polish Championship was the 1983 edition of the Team Polish Championship.

Stal Gorzów Wielkopolski won the gold medal. The team included Jerzy Rembas, Edward Jancarz and Bogusław Nowak.

=== First League ===
Pos	Club	Pts	W	D	L	+/−
1	Stal Gorzów Wielkopolski	30	15	0	3	+225
2	Unia Leszno	28	14	0	4	+242
3	Apator Toruń	24	12	0	6	+122
4	Falubaz Zielona Góra	20	10	0	8	+114
5	Wybrzeże Gdańsk	17	8	1	9	–21
6	Kolejarz Opole	16	8	0	10	+34
7	Stal Rzeszów	16	8	0	10	–96
8	Start Gniezno	14	6	2	10	–91
9	Polonia Bydgoszcz	10	5	0	13	–180
10	Motor Lublin	5	2	1	15	–349

=== Second League ===
Pos	Club	Pts	W	D	L	+/−
1	ROW Rybnik	24	12	0	2	+391
2	GKM Grudziądz	20	10	0	4	+201
3	Śląsk Świętochłowice	20	10	0	4	+176
4	Ostrovia Ostrów	18	9	0	5	+55
5	Unia Tarnów	14	7	0	7	–89
6	Włókniarz Częstochowa	8	4	0	10	–163
7	Motor Lublin II	4	2	0	12	–276
8	Sparta Wrocław	4	2	0	12	–295
