= 1984 Polish speedway season =

Motorcycle racing competition

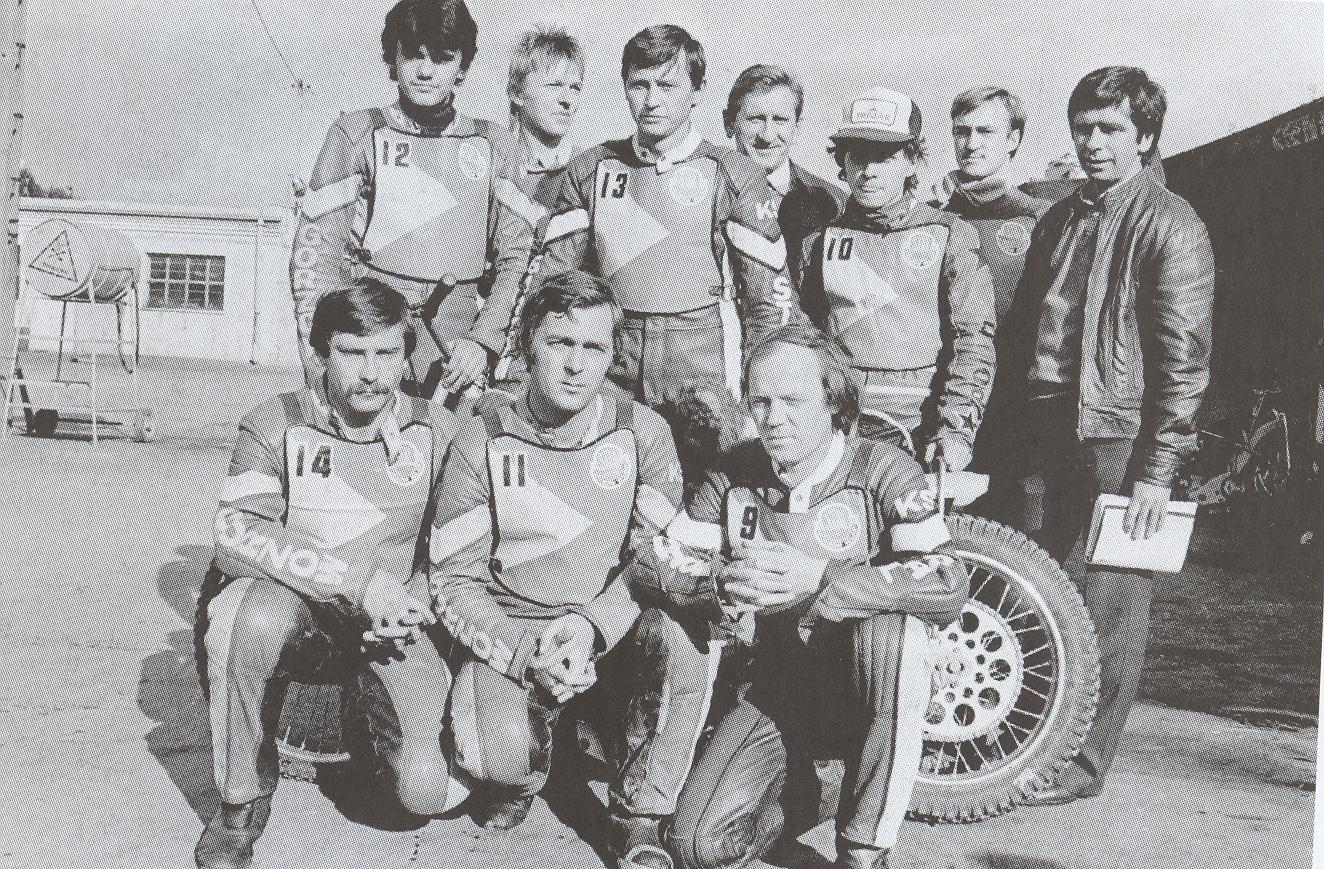
- The Stal Gorzów team in 1984

The 1984 Polish Speedway season was the 1984 season of motorcycle speedway in Poland.

== Individual ==
=== Polish Individual Speedway Championship ===
The 1984 Individual Speedway Polish Championship final was held on 16 September at Gorzów.

Pos.	Rider	Club	Total	Points
1	Zenon Plech	Wybrzeże Gdańsk	14	(3,3,3,2,3)
2	Jerzy Rembas	Stal Gorzów Wlkp.	13+3	(3,3,2,3,2)
3	Andrzej Huszcza	Falubaz Zielona Góra	13+2	(3,2,3,3,2)
4	Bolesław Proch	Polonia Bydgoszcz	11	(1,3,3,1,3)
5	Piotr Pyszny	ROW Rybnik	11	(2,2,1,3,3)
6	Leonard Raba	Kolejarz Opole	10	(3,1,2,2,2)
7	Maciej Jaworek	Falubaz Zielona Góra	9	(1,2,1,3,2)
8	Wojciech Żabiałowicz	Apator Toruń	9	(2,1,3,2,1)
9	Bogusław Nowak	Stal Gorzów Wlkp.	6	(1,3,1,1,0)
10	Tadeusz Wiśniewski	Apator Toruń	5	(0,1,2,1,1)
11	Włodzimierz Heliński	Unia Leszno	4	(0,1,d,d,3)
12	Roman Jankowski	Unia Leszno	4	(2,d,0,2,d)
13	Zdzisław Rutecki	Polonia Bydgoszcz	4	(2,w,2,0,u)
14	Lech Kędziora	GKM Grudziądz	4	(1,2,0,0,1)
15	Antoni Skupień	ROW Rybnik	1	(0,0,0,1,0)
16	Zenon Kasprzak	Unia Leszno	0	(d,d,–,–,–)
17	Wiesław Pawlak (res)	Falubaz Zielona Góra	2	(1,1)
18	Stanisław Miedziński (res)	Apator Toruń	0	(0)

=== Golden Helmet ===
The 1984 Golden Golden Helmet (Polish: Turniej o Złoty Kask, ZK) organised by the Polish Motor Union (PZM) was the 1984 event for the league's leading riders. The final was held on 7 July at Wrocław.

Pos.	Rider	Club	Total	Points
1	Roman Jankowski	Unia Leszno	14	(3,3,3,3,2)
2	Grzegorz Dzikowski	Wybrzeże Gdańsk	13	(2,3,3,2,3)
3	Leonard Raba	Kolejarz Opole	12	(3,3,1,2,3)
4	Eugeniusz Błaszak	Stal Rzeszów	10	(3,3,2,d,2)
5	Antoni Skupień	ROW Rybnik	9	(1,1,3,1,3)
6	Ryszard Buśkiewicz	Polonia Bydgoszcz	9	(2,2,w,3,2)
7	Edward Jancarz	Stal Gorzów Wlkp.	9	(2,2,1,1,3)
8	Dariusz Stenka	Wybrzeże Gdańsk	8	(3,1,w,3,1)
9	Bogusław Nowak	Stal Gorzów Wlkp.	8	(2,1,2,1,2)
10	Zdzisław Rutecki	Polonia Bydgoszcz	7	(0,0,3,3,1)
11	Jan Nowak	ROW Rybnik	4	(0,2,0,2,d)
12	Grzegorz Sterna	Unia Leszno	4	(1,1,0,2,0)
13	Jerzy Rembas	Stal Gorzów Wlkp.	3	(1,2,u,–,–)
14	Paweł Waloszek	Śląsk Świętochłowice	3	(1,d,2,0,d)
15	Dariusz Bieda	Włókniarz Częstochowa	3	(0,0,1,1,1)
16	Bronisław Klimowicz	ROW Rybnik	0	(d,d,u,–,–)
17	Waldemar Korczyński (res)	Sparta Wrocław	3	(2,0,1)
18	Sławomir Gonciarz (res)	Sparta Wrocław	0	(d)

=== Junior Championship ===
- winner - Wojciech Załuski

=== Silver Helmet ===
- winner - Ryszard Dołomisiewicz

=== Bronze Helmet ===
- winner - Ryszard Dołomisiewicz

== Pairs ==
=== Polish Pairs Speedway Championship ===
The 1984 Polish Pairs Speedway Championship was the 1984 edition of the Polish Pairs Speedway Championship. The final was held on 21 June at Chorzów.

Pos	Team	Pts	Riders
1	Unia Leszno	24	Roman Jankowski 9, Zenon Kasprzak 15
2	Stal Gorzów Wlkp.	22	Edward Jancarz 8, Jerzy Rembas 9, Bogusław Nowak 5
3	Wybrzeże Gdańsk	20	Zenon Plech 11, Grzegorz Dzikowski 6, Dariusz Stenka 3
4	Falubaz Zielona Góra	18	Andrzej Huszcza 8, Maciej Jaworek 10, Stefan Żeromski 0
5	Apator Toruń	14	Wojciech Żabiałowicz 2, Tadeusz Wiśniewski 7, Eugeniusz Miastkowski 5
6	Stal Rzeszów	14	Ryszard Czarnecki 10, Antoni Krzywonos 4, Janusz Stachyra 0
7	ROW Rybnik	13	Antoni Skupień 0, Henryk Bem 12, Jan Nowak 1

== Team ==
=== Team Speedway Polish Championship ===
The 1984 Team Speedway Polish Championship was the 1984 edition of the Team Polish Championship.

Unia Leszno won the league but were stripped of the gold medal. Leading Stal Rzeszów 41–25 after eleven races, they allowed Stal to win the final four heats 5-1 for a 45–45 draw. This guaranteed that Stal would not have to take part in a relegation/promotion play off. GKSŻ considered the behavior of Leszno as unsportsmanlike and awarded the match 41–25. Leszno were stripped of the title and Stal took part in the play off which they won. The team included Roman Jankowski, Zenon Kasprzak, Bernard Jąder, Włodzimierz Heliński, Piotr Pawlicki and Mariusz Okoniewski.

=== First League ===
Pos	Club	Pts	W	D	L	+/−
x	Unia Leszno	26	13	0	5	+266
2	Stal Gorzów Wielkopolski	25	12	1	5	+85
3	Falubaz Zielona Góra	21	10	1	7	+125
4	ROW Rybnik	19	9	1	8	–65
5	Apator Toruń	18	9	0	9	+29
6	Kolejarz Opole	18	9	0	9	–11
7	Wybrzeże Gdańsk	17	7	3	8	–35
8	Polonia Bydgoszcz	16	7	2	9	–23
9	Stal Rzeszów	16	7	2	9	–134
10	Start Gniezno	4	2	0	16	–237

=== Second League ===
Pos	Club	Pts	W	D	L	+/−
1	Śląsk Świętochłowice	18	9	0	3	+172
2	Unia Tarnów	16	8	0	4	+117
3	Ostrovia Ostrów	16	8	0	4	+85
4	Motor Lublin	14	7	0	5	+141
5	GKM Grudziądz	12	6	0	6	+45
6	Włókniarz Częstochowa	6	3	0	9	–111
7	Sparta Wrocław	2	1	0	11	–449
