= 1977 Polish speedway season =

Motorcycle racing competition

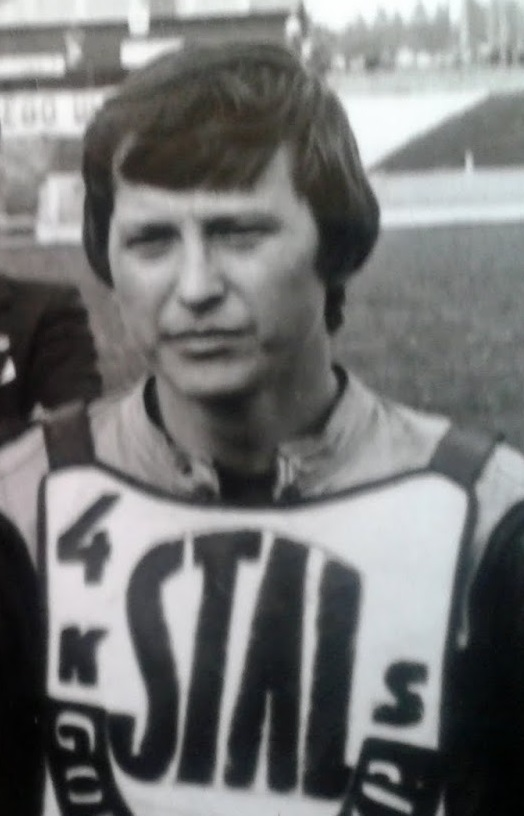
- Bogusław Nowak, 1977 Polish champion

The 1977 Polish Speedway season was the 1977 season of motorcycle speedway in Poland.

== Individual ==
=== Polish Individual Speedway Championship ===
The 1977 Individual Speedway Polish Championship final was held on 22 July at Gorzów.

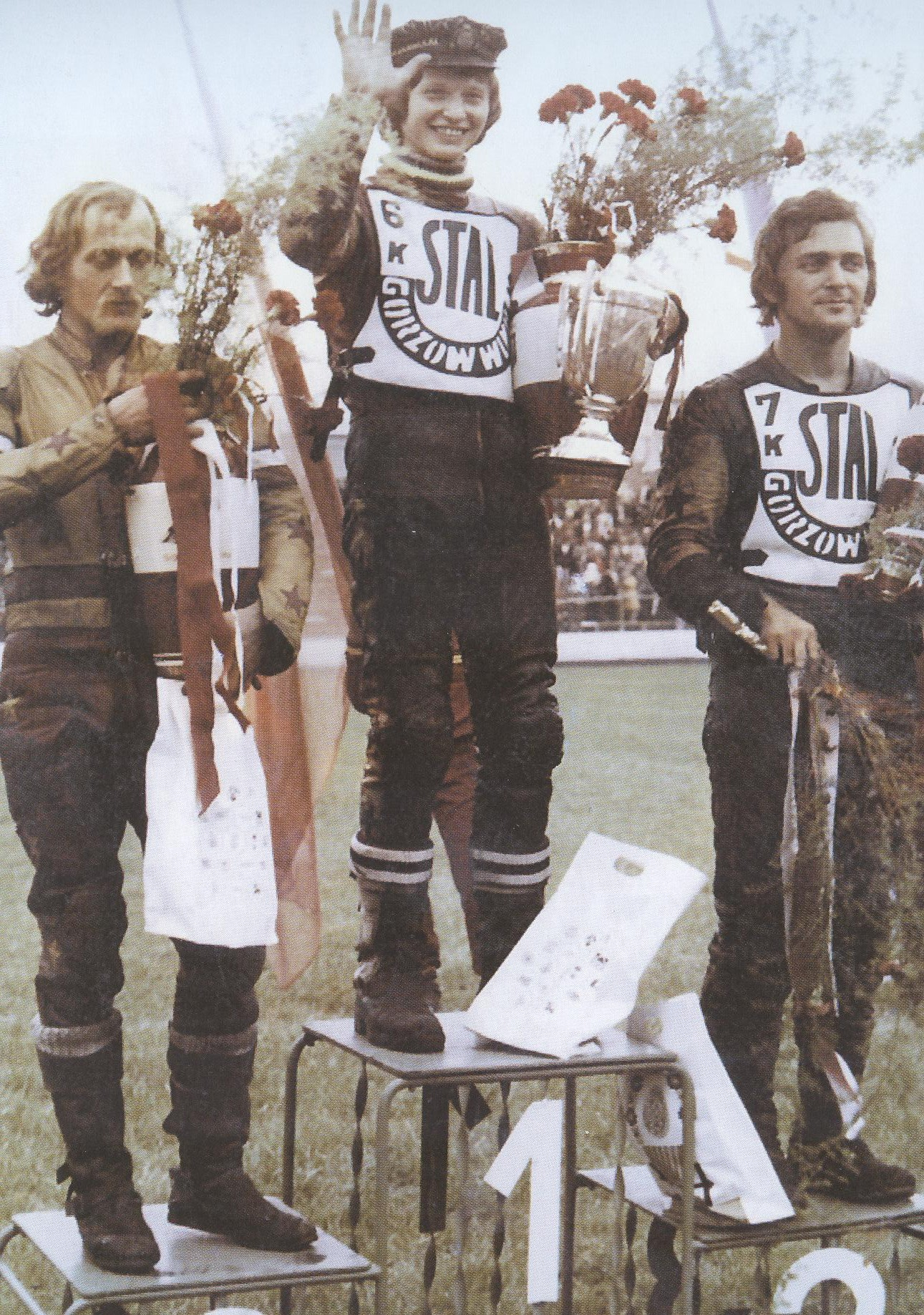
1977 Polish Championship Podium

Pos.	Rider	Club	Total	Points
1	Bogusław Nowak	Gorzów Wlkp.	14	(3,3,3,3,2)
2	Andrzej Tkocz	Rybnik	13	(1,3,3,3,3)
3	Mieczysław Woźniak	Gorzów Wlkp.	12	(2,2,2,3,3)
4	Jerzy Rembas	Gorzów Wlkp.	11	(3,3,1,1,3)
5	Zenon Plech	Gdańsk	10	(3,2,1,3,1)
6	Józef Jarmuła	Częstochowa	9	(d,1,3,2,3)
7	Robert Słaboń	Wrocław	9	(2,2,2,1,2)
8	Zdzisław Dobrucki	Leszno	7	(d,3,0,2,2)
9	Piotr Bruzda	Wrocław	7	(3,1,0,2,1)
10	Grzegorz Kuźniar	Rzeszów	6	(2,2,0,1,1)
11	Kazimierz Adamczak	Leszno	5	(1,1,3,u,d)
12	Piotr Pyszny	Rybnik	5	(0,u,2,1,2)
13	Czesław Piwosz	Leszno	4	(2,0,0,2,0)
14	Tadeusz Berej	Lublin	4	(1,0,2,0,1)
15	Henryk Glücklich	Bydgoszcz	2	(0,1,1,0,0)
16	Paweł Waloszek	Świętochłowice	1	(0,0,1,0,0)
17	Antoni Fojcik (res)	Rybnik	ns	
18	Marek Towalski (res)	Gorzów Wlkp.	ns	

=== Golden Helmet ===
The 1977 Golden Golden Helmet (Polish: Turniej o Złoty Kask, ZK) organised by the Polish Motor Union (PZM) was the 1977 event for the league's leading riders.

Final classification (top 20)

Pos.	Rider	Club	Pts	Total
1	Jerzy Rembas	Stal Gorzów Wlkp.	15,8,15,14	52
2	Jan Mucha	Śląsk Świętochłowice	13,10,14,14	51
3	Bogusław Nowak	Stal Gorzów Wlkp.	10,15,12,13	50
4	Wojciech Kaczmarek	Start Gniezno	3,13,13,–	29
5	Andrzej Tkocz	ROW Rybnik	11,2,10,5	28
6	Zdzisław Dobrucki	Unia Leszno	8,9,–,8	25
7	Tadeusz Berej	Motor Lublin	5,8,4,8	25
8	Jerzy Kochman	Śląsk Świętochłowice	1,8,11,2	22
9	Andrzej Jurczyński	Włókniarz Częstochowa	10,10,0,–	20
10	Robert Slabon	Sparta Wrocław	10,10,–,–	20
11	Piotr Bruzda	Sparta Wrocław	7,2,7,–	16
12	Leonard Raba	Kolejarz Opole	–,–,4,12	16
13	Czesław Goszczyński	Włókniarz Częstochowa	6,9,–,–	15
14	Andrzej Marynowski	Wybrzeże Gdańsk	–,6,4,5	15
15	Antoni Fojcik	ROW Rybnik	7,2,–,–	9
16	Mariusz Okoniewski	Unia Leszno	–,–,–,9	9
17	Bernard Jąder	Unia Leszno	–,–,–,9	9
18	Henryk Żyto	Wybrzeże Gdańsk	5,–,3,–	8
19	Alfred Siekierka	Kolejarz Opole	–,–,7,0	7
20	Roman Jankowski	Unia Leszno	–,–,–,7	7

=== Junior Championship ===
- winner - Marek Ziarnik

=== Silver Helmet ===
- winner - Andrzej Huszcza

=== Bronze Helmet ===
- winner - Mieczysław Kmieciak

== Pairs ==
=== Polish Pairs Speedway Championship ===
The 1977 Polish Pairs Speedway Championship was the 1977 edition of the Polish Pairs Speedway Championship. The final was held on 18 August at Ostrów Wielkopolski.

Pos	Team	Pts	Riders
1	Stal Gorzów Wlkp.	26	Jerzy Rembas 14, Bogusław Nowak 12
2	Włókniarz Częstochowa	21	Andrzej Jurczyński 16, Czesław Goszczyński 5
3	Kolejarz Opole	20	Leonard Raba 16, Franciszek Stach 4
4	Sparta Wrocław	18	Bolesław Gorczyca 8, Robert Słaboń 10
5	Polonia Bydgoszcz	16	Andrzej Koselski 10, Marian Zaranek 6
6	ROW Rybnik	15	Andrzej Tkocz 7, Piotr Pyszny 8
7	Stal Toruń	4	Janusz Plewiński 1, Jerzy Kniaź 3

== Team ==
=== Team Speedway Polish Championship ===
The 1977 Team Speedway Polish Championship was the 1977 edition of the Team Polish Championship.

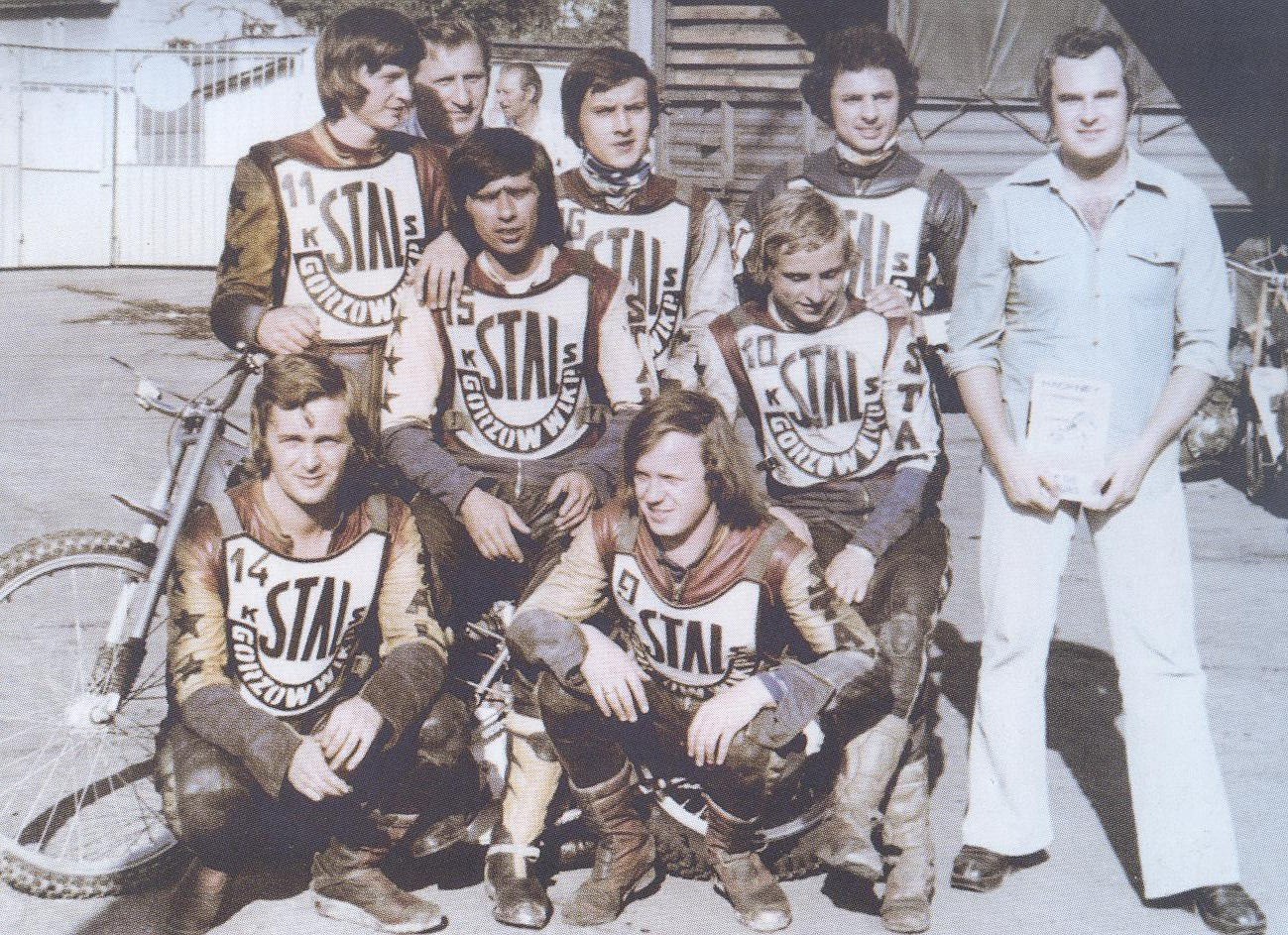
1977 Champions - Stal Gorzów Wielkopolski

Stal Gorzów Wielkopolski won the gold medal for the third successive year. The team included Edward Jancarz, Bogusław Nowak, Ryszard Fabiszewski, Jerzy Rembas and Bolesław Proch.

=== First League ===
Pos	Club	Pts	W	D	L	+/−
1	Stal Gorzów Wielkopolski	26	13	0	5	+284
2	Unia Leszno	22	11	0	7	+180
3	Włókniarz Częstochowa	22	11	0	7	+88
4	Polonia Bydgoszcz	20	10	0	8	+131
5	Kolejarz Opole	20	10	0	8	+95
6	Wybrzeże Gdańsk	16	8	0	10	–26
7	ROW Rybnik	16	8	0	10	–129
8	Stal Toruń	16	8	0	10	–152
9	Motor Lublin	12	6	0	12	–243
10	Sparta Wrocław	10	5	0	13	–228

=== Second League ===
Pos	Club	Pts	W	D	L	+/−
1	Falubaz Zielona Góra	18	9	0	3	+266
2	Śląsk Świętochłowice	18	9	0	3	+214
3	Start Gniezno	17	8	1	3	+70
4	Stal Rzeszów	15	7	1	4	+84
5	Gwardia Łódź	8	4	0	8	–85
6	Unia Tarnów	4	2	0	10	–242
7	GSŻ Grudziądz	4	2	0	10	–307
