= 1982 Polish speedway season =

Motorcycle racing competition

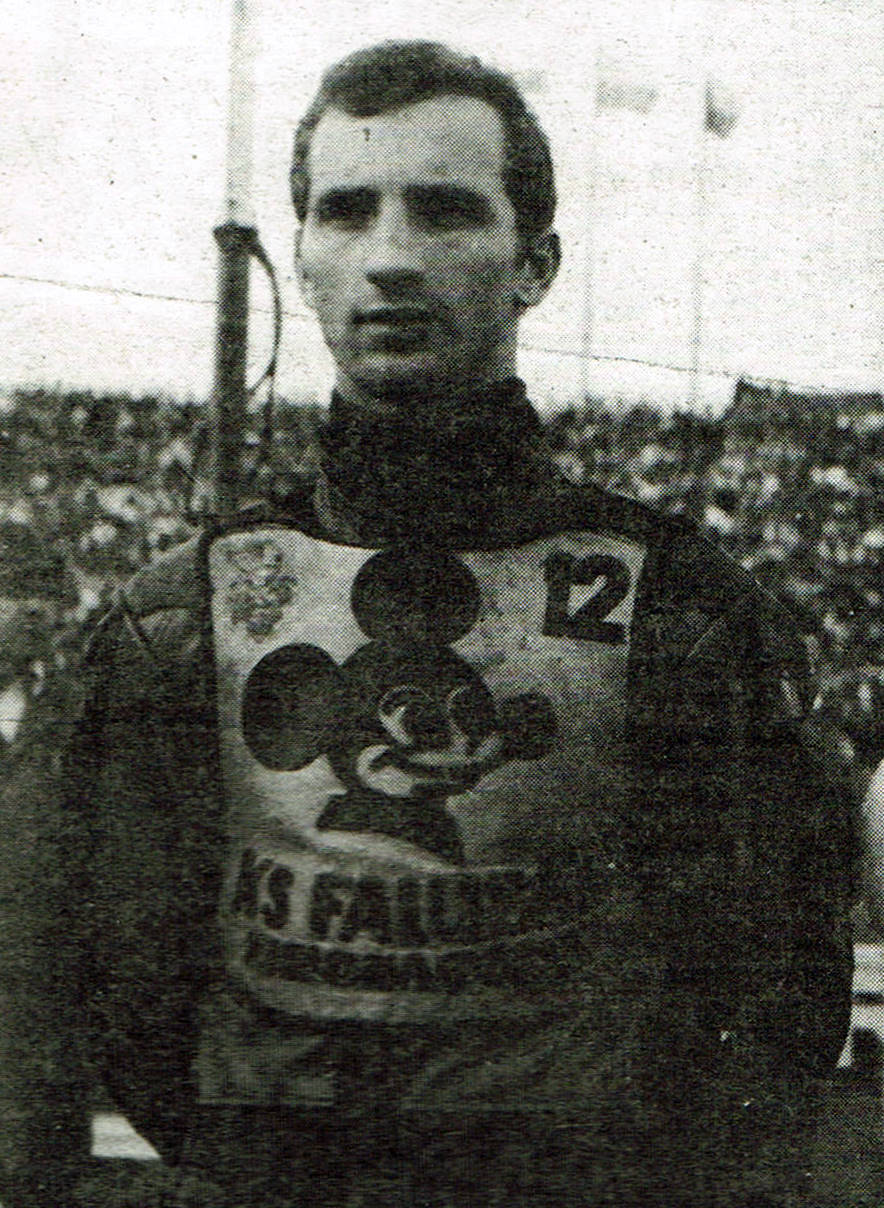
- Henryk Olszak helped Zielona Góra win the league championship

The 1982 Polish Speedway season was the 1982 season of motorcycle speedway in Poland.

== Individual ==
=== Polish Individual Speedway Championship ===
The 1982 Individual Speedway Polish Championship final was held on 22 July at Zielona Góra.

Pos.	Rider	Club	Total	Points
1	Andrzej Huszcza	Falubaz Zielona Góra	14+3	(2,3,3,3,3)
2	Leonard Raba	Kolejarz Opole	14+2	(3,3,3,2,3)
3	Roman Jankowski	Unia Leszno	13	(1,3,3,3,3)
4	Edward Jancarz	Stal Gorzów Wlkp.	11	(3,3,1,2,2)
5	Ryszard Czarnecki	Stal Rzeszów	9	(3,2,2,0,2)
6	Piotr Pyszny	ROW Rybnik	9	(3,2,1,2,1)
7	Marek Kępa	Motor Lublin	9	(2,1,2,3,1)
8	Henryk Olszak	Falubaz Zielona Góra	5	(2,0,3,w,d)
9	Mirosław Berliński	Wybrzeże Gdańsk	5	(0,2,0,w,3)
10	Bogusław Nowak	Stal Gorzów Wlkp.	5	(1,2,2,w,0)
11	Jerzy Kochman	Śląsk Świętochłowice	5	(0,0,2,1,2)
12	Andrzej Maroszek (res)	Polonia Bydgoszcz	5	(0,2,1,2)
13	Andrzej Marynowski	Wybrzeże Gdańsk	4	(0,1,1,1,1)
14	Bolesław Proch	Polonia Bydgoszcz	3	(2,1,0,u,–)
15	Jan Krzystyniak (res)	Falubaz Zielona Góra	3	(3)
16	Grzegorz Kuźniar	Stal Rzeszów	2	(1,1,d,d,d)
17	Ryszard Buśkiewicz	Unia Leszno	1	(1,d,–,–,–)
18	Antoni Krzywonos	Stal Rzeszów	1	(0,0,1,0,u)
19	Zenon Plech	Wybrzeże Gdańsk		(ns)
20	Eugeniusz Błaszak	Start Gniezno		(ns)
21	Alfred Siekierka	Kolejarz Opole		(ns)

=== Golden Helmet ===
The 1982 Golden Golden Helmet (Polish: Turniej o Złoty Kask, ZK) organised by the Polish Motor Union (PZM) was the 1982 event for the league's leading riders. The final was held on 17 October at Leszno.

Pos.	Rider	Club	Total	Points
1	Roman Jankowski	Leszno	15	(3,3,3,3,3)
2	Wojciech Żabiałowicz	Toruń	13	(3,3,2,2,3)
3	Włodzimierz Heliński+	Leszno	12	(3,1,3,3,2)
4	Mirosław Berliński	Gdańsk	10+3	(2,2,1,2,3)
5	Andrzej Huszcza	Zielona Góra	10+2	(w,1,3,3,3)
6	Jan Ząbik	Toruń	9	(1,3,0,3,2)
7	Leonard Raba	Opole	8	(2,2,1,2,1)
8	Jerzy Rembas (res)	Gorzów Wlkp.	8	(3,1,2,2)
9	Marek Kępa	Lublin	6	(3,3,u,w,n,s)
10	Bogusław Nowak	Gorzów Wlkp.	6	(1,2,2,0,1)
11	Maciej Jaworek	Zielona Góra	5	(0,1,2,2,0)
12	Czesław Piwosz	Leszno	5	(1,1,1,1,1)
13	Ryszard Buśkiewicz	Leszno	4	(2,2,w)
14	Paweł Waloszek	Świętochłowice	3	(2,0,0,0,1)
15	Piotr Pyszny	Rybnik	3	(1,d,1,1,n,s)
16	Henryk Olszak	Zielona Góra	2	(d,d,2)
17	Bernard Jąder (res)	Leszno	1	(0,1,u)
18	Robert Słaboń	Wrocław	0	(0,0,d)
19	Eugeniusz Błaszak	Gniezno	0	(ns)

+ not awarded a medal because they were a guest rider

== Pairs ==
=== Polish Pairs Speedway Championship ===
The 1982 Polish Pairs Speedway Championship was the 1982 edition of the Polish Pairs Speedway Championship. The final was held on 21 August at Gorzów Wielkopolski.

Pos	Team	Pts	Riders
1	Falubaz Zielona Góra	26	Andrzej Huszcza 17, Jan Krzystyniak 9
2	Unia Leszno	24	Roman Jankowski 15, Ryszard Buśkiewicz 9
3	Stal Gorzów Wlkp.	22	Bogusław Nowak 10, Jerzy Rembas 12
4	Stal Rzeszów	19	Ryszard Czarnecki 13, Grzegorz Kuźniar 6
5	Apator Toruń	17	Wojciech Żabiałowicz 13, Eugeniusz Miastkowski 4
6	Polonia Bydgoszcz	10	Bolesław Proch 10, Marek Ziarnik 0
7	Włókniarz Częstochowa	8	Józef Kafel 1, Zygmunt Nocuń 7

=== Junior Championship ===
- winner - Maciej Jaworek

=== Silver Helmet ===
- winner - Maciej Jaworek

== Team ==
=== Team Speedway Polish Championship ===
The 1982 Team Speedway Polish Championship was the 1982 edition of the Team Polish Championship.

Falubaz Zielona Góra won the gold medal for the second successive season. The team included Andrzej Huszcza, Henryk Olszak, Jan Krzystyniak and Maciej Jaworek.

=== First League ===
Pos	Club	Pts	W	D	L	+/−
1	Falubaz Zielona Góra	28	14	0	4	+176
2	Unia Leszno	25	12	1	5	+253
3	Stal Gorzów Wielkopolski	20	10	0	8	+67
4	Kolejarz Opole	20	10	0	8	–18
5	Wybrzeże Gdańsk	19	9	1	8	+9
6	Apator Toruń	16	8	0	10	–4
7	Stal Rzeszów	16	7	2	9	–58
8	Polonia Bydgoszcz	14	7	0	11	–37
9	Start Gniezno	12	6	0	12	–186
10	ROW Rybnik	10	5	0	13	–202

=== Second League ===
Pos	Club	Pts	W	D	L	+/−
1	Motor Lublin	19	9	1	2	+284
2	Unia Tarnów	16	8	0	4	+27
3	Włókniarz Częstochowa	14	7	0	5	+55
4	Śląsk Świętochłowice	11	5	1	6	+49
5	Ostrovia Ostrów	10	3	4	5	–94
6	GKM Grudziądz	8	4	0	8	–163
7	Sparta Wrocław	6	2	2	8	–158
