= 1981 Polish speedway season =

Motorcycle racing competition

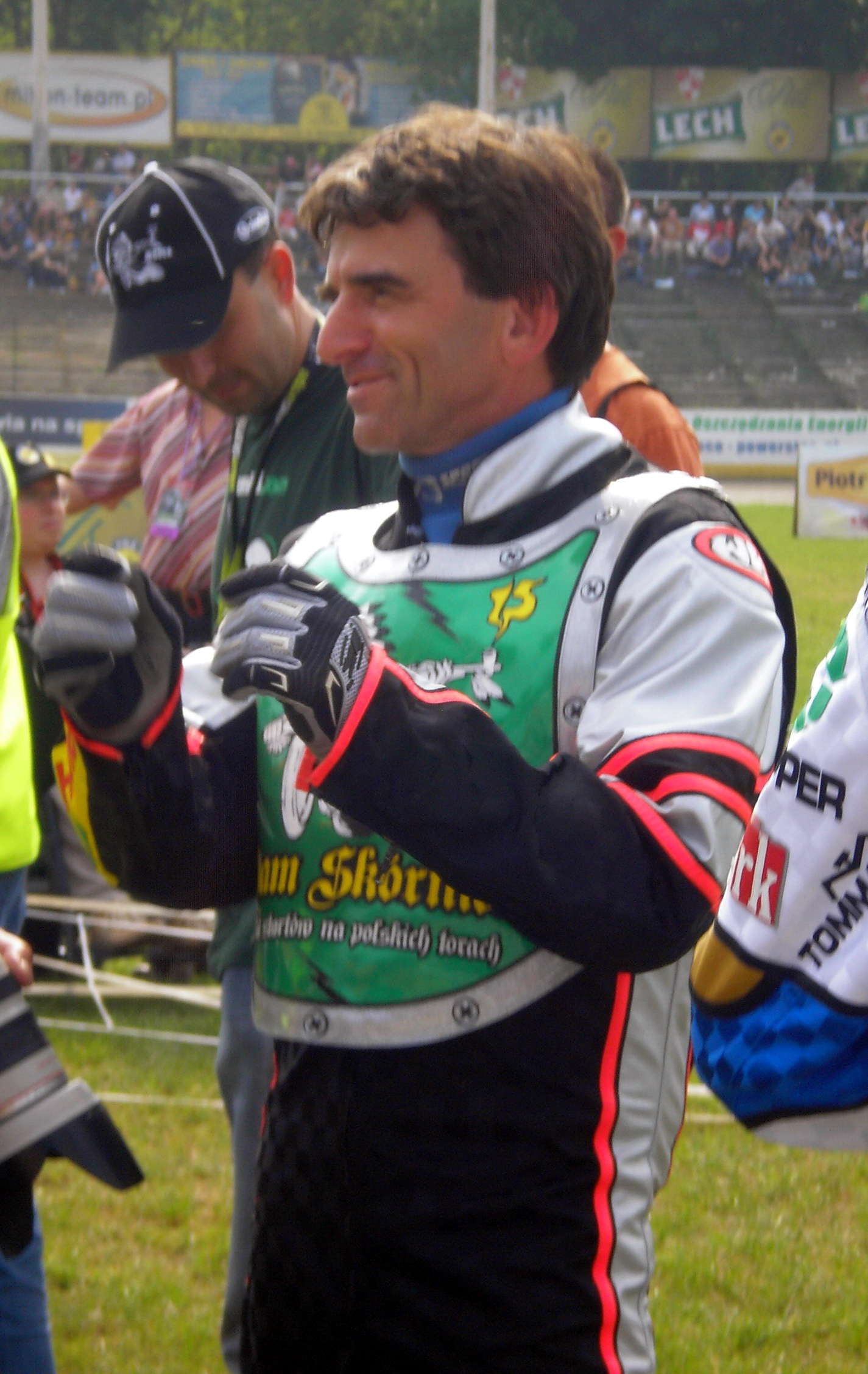
- Roman Jankowski, 1981 Polish champion

The 1981 Polish Speedway season was the 1981 season of motorcycle speedway in Poland.

== Individual ==
=== Polish Individual Speedway Championship ===
The 1981 Individual Speedway Polish Championship final was held on 22 July at Leszno.

| Pos. | Rider | Club | Total | Points |
|---|---|---|---|---|
| 1 | Roman Jankowski | Unia Leszno | 15 | (3,3,3,3,3) |
| 2 | Zenon Plech | Wybrzeże Gdańsk | 13 | (3,3,3,2,2) |
| 3 | Edward Jancarz | Stal Gorzów Wlkp. | 12+3 | (3,2,3,1,3) |
| 4 | Ryszard Buśkiewicz | Unia Leszno | 12+u | (1,2,3,3,3) |
| 5 | Leon Kujawski | Start Gniezno | 10 | (2,3,2,2,1) |
| 6 | Alfred Siekierka | Kolejarz Opole | 9 | (3,1,2,3,w) |
| 7 | Jan Ząbik | Apator Toruń | 9 | (1,2,2,2,2) |
| 8 | Henryk Olszak | Falubaz Zielona Góra | 8 | (2,3,u,3,0) |
| 9 | Kazimierz Wójcik | Start Gniezno | 7 | (0,1,1,2,3) |
| 10 | Jerzy Kochman | Śląsk Świętochłowice | 5 | (2,1,d,d,2) |
| 11 | Antoni Skupień | ROW Rybnik | 5 | (1,0,2,1,1) |
| 12 | Mariusz Okoniewski | Unia Leszno | 4 | (2,0,w,1,1) |
| 13 | Maciej Jaworek | Falubaz Zielona Góra | 4 | (w,2,u,1,1) |
| 14 | Mieczysław Woźniak | Stal Gorzów Wlkp. | 2 | (w,d,d,0,2) |
| 15 | Bogdan Skrobisz | Wybrzeże Gdańsk | 2 | (1,1,0,0,0) |
| 16 | Wojciech Kaczmarek | Start Gniezno | 1 | (u,0,1,0,d) |
| 17 | Wlodzimierz Helinski (res) | Unia Leszno | 1 | (1) |
| 18 | Bernard Jąder (res) | Unia Leszno | 0 | (0) |
| 19 | Andrzej Huszcza | Falubaz Zielona Góra | | (ns) |
| 20 | Jerzy Rembas | Stal Gorzów Wlkp. | | (ns) |

=== Golden Helmet ===
The 1981 Golden Golden Helmet (Polish: Turniej o Złoty Kask, ZK) organised by the Polish Motor Union (PZM) was the 1981 event for the league's leading riders. It was held over 4 rounds.

Final standings (top 11)

| Pos. | Rider | Club | Total | Points |
|---|---|---|---|---|
| 1 | Bolesław Proch | Polonia Bydgoszcz | 47 | 12,12,14,9 |
| 2 | Leonard Raba | Opole | 45 | 15,9,9,12 |
| 3 | Jan Ząbik | Toruń | 39 | 9,12,8,10 |
| 4 | Wojciech Żabiałowicz | Toruń | 33 | 3,13,8,9 |
| 5 | Ryszard Buśkiewicz | Leszno | 30 | 10,9,9,2 |
| 6 | Mirosław Berliński | Gdańsk | 29 | 9,7,8,5 |
| 7 | Jerzy Kochman | Świętochłowice | 28 | 13,0,13,2 |
| 8 | Marek Towalski | Gorzów | 27 | 9,5,11,2 |
| 9 | Maciej Jaworek | Zielona Góra | 26 | 9,6,10,1 |
| 10 | Jan Krzystyniak | Zielona Góra | 22 | 3,10,7,2 |
| 11 | Leon Kujawski | Start Gniezno | 20 | 6,7,5,2 |

=== Junior Championship ===
- winner - Stanisław Pogorzelski

=== Silver Helmet ===
- winner - Mirosław Berliński

=== Bronze Helmet ===
- winner - Mirosław Berliński

== Pairs ==
=== Polish Pairs Speedway Championship ===
The 1981 Polish Pairs Speedway Championship was the 1981 edition of the Polish Pairs Speedway Championship. The final was held on 3 June at Toruń.

| Pos | Team | Pts | Riders |
|---|---|---|---|
| 1 | Stal Gorzów Wlkp. | 24 | Jerzy Rembas 16, Marek Towalski 8 |
| 2 | Apator Toruń | 23 | Wojciech Żabiałowicz 13, Jan Ząbik 10 |
| 3 | Kolejarz Opole | 20 | Alfred Siekierka 12, Jacek Goerlitz 8 |
| 4 | Unia Leszno | 19 | Roman Jankowski 16, Ryszard Buśkiewicz 3 |
| 5 | Start Gniezno | 15 | Eugeniusz Błaszak 10, Leon Kujawski 5 |
| 6 | Śląsk Świętochłowice | 14 | Jerzy Kochman 13, Krzysztof Zarzecki 1 |
| 7 | Stal Rzeszów | 11 | Ryszard Romaniak 5, Grzegorz Kuźniar 6 |

== Team ==
=== Team Speedway Polish Championship ===
The 1981 Team Speedway Polish Championship was the 1981 edition of the Team Polish Championship.

Falubaz Zielona Góra won the gold medal. The team included Andrzej Huszcza, Henryk Olszak, Jan Krzystyniak and Maciej Jaworek.

=== First League ===
| Pos | Club | Pts | W | D | L | +/− |
|---|---|---|---|---|---|---|
| 1 | Falubaz Zielona Góra | 26 | 13 | 0 | 5 | +240 |
| 2 | Stal Gorzów Wielkopolski | 24 | 12 | 0 | 6 | +150 |
| 3 | Unia Leszno | 20 | 10 | 0 | 8 | +108 |
| 4 | Wybrzeże Gdańsk | 20 | 10 | 0 | 8 | –26 |
| 5 | Start Gniezno | 19 | 9 | 1 | 8 | +26 |
| 6 | Kolejarz Opole | 18 | 9 | 0 | 9 | +22 |
| 7 | Apator Toruń | 16 | 8 | 0 | 10 | –43 |
| 8 | ROW Rybnik | 16 | 8 | 0 | 10 | –66 |
| 9 | Polonia Bydgoszcz | 13 | 6 | 1 | 11 | –148 |
| 10 | Włókniarz Częstochowa | 8 | 4 | 0 | 14 | –263 |

=== Second League ===
| Pos | Club | Pts | W | D | L | +/− |
|---|---|---|---|---|---|---|
| 1 | Stal Rzeszów | 21 | 10 | 1 | 1 | +176 |
| 2 | Motor Lublin | 16 | 8 | 0 | 4 | +184 |
| 3 | GKM Grudziądz | 12 | 6 | 0 | 6 | +29 |
| 4 | Unia Tarnów | 12 | 5 | 2 | 5 | –10 |
| 5 | Ostrovia Ostrów | 12 | 6 | 0 | 6 | –82 |
| 6 | Śląsk Świętochłowice | 11 | 5 | 1 | 6 | +7 |
| 7 | Sparta Wrocław | 0 | 0 | 0 | 12 | –304 |
