= 1979 Polish speedway season =

Motorcycle racing competition

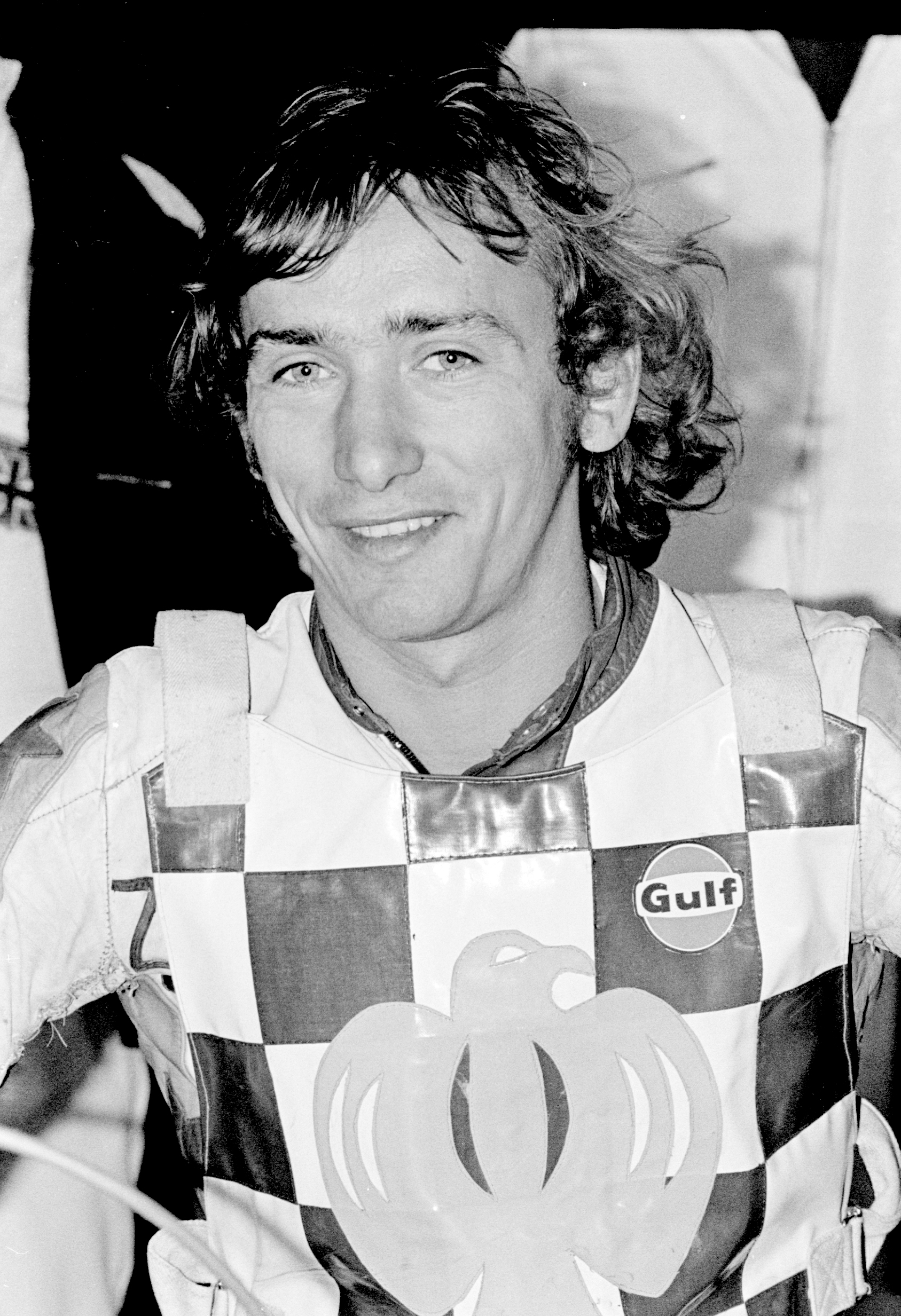
- Zenon Plech, Polish champion of that year

The 1979 Polish Speedway season was the 1979 season of motorcycle speedway in Poland.

== Individual ==
=== Polish Individual Speedway Championship ===
The 1979 Individual Speedway Polish Championship final was held on 22 July at Gorzów.

Pos.	Rider	Club	Total	Points
1	Zenon Plech	Gdańsk	13 +3	(2,3,2,3,3)
2	Mieczysław Woźniak	Gorzów Wlkp.	13 +2	(3,2,3,3,2)
3	Robert Słaboń	Wrocław	12	(3,3,3,u,3)
4	Bernard Jąder	Leszno	11	(1,3,2,2,3)
5	Eugeniusz Błaszak	Gniezno	11	(3,3,1,2,2)
6	Andrzej Huszcza	Zielona Góra	9	(3,1,3,0,2)
7	Jerzy Kochman	Świętochłowice	8	(1,2,3,2,0)
8	Piotr Pyszny	Rybnik	7	(1,2,0,3,1)
9	Bolesław Proch	Gorzów Wlkp.	6	(u,0,2,3,1)
10	Kazimierz Adamczak	Leszno	6	(2,2,2,w,d)
11	Andrzej Marynowski	Gdańsk	5	(2,0,1,1,1)
12	Jan Ząbik	Toruń	4	(d,1,1,1,1)
13	Grzegorz Kuźniar	Rzeszów	3	(2,u,1,–,–)
14	Eugeniusz Miastkowski	Toruń	3	(d,1,d,2,0)
15	Antoni Fojcik	Rybnik	2	(0,0,0,d,2)
16	Bolesław Gorczyca	Wrocław	1	(0,1,0,d,–)
17	Jerzy Rembas	Gorzów Wlkp.	4	(1,3)
18	Marek Towalski	Gorzów Wlkp.	0	(u)

=== Golden Helmet ===
The 1979 Golden Golden Helmet (Polish: Turniej o Złoty Kask, ZK) organised by the Polish Motor Union (PZM) was the 1979 event for the league's leading riders. It was held over 4 rounds.

Pos.	Rider	Club	Pts	Total
1	Robert Słaboń	Sparta Wrocław	15,12,14,11	52
2	Piotr Pyszny	ROW Rybnik	4,13,10,15	42
3	Mariusz Okoniewski	Unia Leszno	10,11,9,9	39
4	Jerzy Kochman	Śląsk Świętochłowice	10,8,11,7	36
5	Henryk Olszak	Falubaz Zielona Góra	5,10,11,8	34
6	Jerzy Rembas	Stal Gorzów Wlkp.	12,9,8,4	33
7	Andrzej Huszcza	Falubaz Zielona Góra	12,8,6,5	31
8	Jacek Goerlitz	Kolejarz Opole	13,1,5,10	29
9	Eugeniusz Błaszak	Start Gniezno	7,3,5,9	24
10	Jan Ząbik	Toruń	2,6,5,11	24
11	Wojciech Zabialowicz	Toruń	4,5,10,3	22
12	Roman Jankowski	Unia Leszno	6,5,6,4	21
13	Bogdan Skrobisz	Wybrzeże Gdańsk	2,8,1,7	18
14	Mirosław Berliński	Wybrzeże Gdańsk	4,5,0,4	13

=== Junior Championship ===
- winner - Mariusz Okoniewski

=== Silver Helmet ===
- winner - Roman Jankowski

=== Bronze Helmet ===
- winner - Józef Kafel

== Pairs ==
=== Polish Pairs Speedway Championship ===
The 1979 Polish Pairs Speedway Championship was the 1979 edition of the Polish Pairs Speedway Championship. The final was held on 5 July at Gniezno.

Pos	Team	Pts	Riders
1	Falubaz Zielona Góra	23	Andrzej Huszcza 10, Henryk Olszak 13
2	Polonia Bydgoszcz	18	Henryk Glücklich 8, Marek Ziarnik 10
3	Start Gniezno	15	Wojciech Kaczmarek 8, Jan Puk 7
4	Stal Gorzów Wlkp.	14	Jerzy Rembas 9, Bogusław Nowak 5
5	Kolejarz Opole	13	Jacek Goerlitz 12, Alfred Siekierka 1
6	Włókniarz Częstochowa	4	Józef Kafel 4, Daniel Chmielowski 0

== Team ==
=== Team Speedway Polish Championship ===
The 1979 Team Speedway Polish Championship was the 1979 edition of the Team Polish Championship.

Unia Leszno won the gold medal. The team included Mariusz Okoniewski, Bernard Jąder and Roman Jankowski.

=== First League ===
Pos	Club	Pts	W	D	L	+/−
1	Unia Leszno	26	13	0	5	+227
2	Stal Gorzów Wielkopolski	24	11	2	5	+115
3	Falubaz Zielona Góra	22	11	0	7	+201
4	Apator Toruń	22	11	0	7	+140
5	Wybrzeże Gdańsk	20	10	0	8	+60
6	ROW Rybnik	18	9	0	9	+48
7	Włókniarz Częstochowa	18	9	0	9	–54
8	Polonia Bydgoszcz	17	8	1	9	+43
9	Sparta Wrocław	13	6	1	11	–82
10	Śląsk Świętochłowice	0	0	0	18	–696

=== Second League ===
Pos	Club	Pts	W	D	L	+/−
1	Start Gniezno	23	11	1	2	+402
2	Motor Lublin	18	9	0	5	+149
3	Stal Rzeszów	18	9	0	5	+88
4	Kolejarz Opole	17	8	1	5	+193
5	Unia Tarnów	12	6	0	8	–94
6	Gwardia Łódź	12	6	0	8	–211
7	GSŻ Grudziądz	10	5	0	9	–93
8	Ostrovia Ostrów	2	1	0	13	–434
