= 1985 Polish speedway season =

Motorcycle racing competition

The 1985 Polish Speedway season was the 1985 season of motorcycle speedway in Poland.

== Individual ==
=== Polish Individual Speedway Championship ===
The 1985 Individual Speedway Polish Championship final was held on 15 September at Gorzów.

Pos.	Rider	Club	Total	Points
1	Zenon Plech	Wybrzeże Gdańsk	13	(3,2,3,3,2)
2	Bolesław Proch	Polonia Bydgoszcz	12+3	(2,3,3,3,1)
3	Maciej Jaworek	Falubaz Zielona Góra	12+2	(2,1,3,3,3)
4	Andrzej Huszcza	Falubaz Zielona Góra	12+1	(3,2,2,2,3)
5	Piotr Pyszny	ROW Rybnik	10	(1,3,3,3,u)
6	Ryszard Franczyszyn (res)	Stal Gorzów Wlkp.	10	(3,1,0,3,3)
7	Grzegorz Dzikowski	Wybrzeże Gdańsk	8	(2,3,1,2,0)
8	Wojciech Załuski	Kolejarz Opole	7	(1,0,2,2,2)
9	Eugeniusz Miastkowski	Apator Toruń	7	(1,1,2,1,2)
10	Krzysztof Zarzecki	Śląsk Świętochłowice	6	(1,1,2,1,1)
11	Wojciech Żabiałowicz	Apator Toruń	5	(2,2,0,1,0)
12	Krzysztof Okupski (res)	Stal Gorzów Wlkp.	5	(2,1,1,1)
13	Roman Jankowski	Unia Leszno	4	(3,0,1,d,–)
14	Tadeusz Wiśniewski	Apator Toruń	4	(3,0,0,0,1)
15	Mirosław Berliński	Wybrzeże Gdańsk	3	(0,1,0,0,2)
16	Jan Krzystyniak	Falubaz Zielona Góra	2	(0,0,0,2,d)
17	Zdzisław Rutecki	Polonia Bydgoszcz	0	(0,–,–,–,–)
18	Wiesław Pawlak	Falubaz Zielona Góra	0	(u,–,–,–,–)
19	Henryk Bem	ROW Rybnik		(ns)
20	Jerzy Kochman	Śląsk Świętochłowice		(ns)

=== Golden Helmet ===
The 1985 Golden Golden Helmet (Polish: Turniej o Złoty Kask, ZK) organised by the Polish Motor Union (PZM) was the 1985 event for the league's leading riders. The final was held over three rounds.

Pos.	Rider	Club	Total	Points
1	Wojciech Żabiałowicz	Toruń	28	(11,13,15)
2	Mirosław Berliński	Gdańsk	28	(14,14,6)
3	Maciej Jaworek	Zielona Góra	25	(11,8,14)
4	Jan Krzystyniak	Zielona Góra	25	(12,13,9)
5	Zenon Plech	Gdańsk	25	(12,13,2)
6	Andrzej Huszcza	Zielona Góra	21	(11,10,9)
7	Wiesław Pawlak	Zielona Góra	17	(6,1,11)
8	Zdzisław Rutecki	Bydgoszcz	17	(7,7,10)
9	Henryk Bem	Rybnik	16	(9,7,3)
10	Jacek Brucheiser	Ostrów Wlkp.	15	(0,5,10)
11	Wojciech Załuski	Opole	14	(7,-,7)
12	Jerzy Rembas	Gorzów Wlkp.	10	(4,4,6)
13	Dariusz Stenka	Gdańsk	9	(1,8,-)
14	Piotr Podrzycki	Gniezno	9	(5,4,-)
15	Piotr Pyszny	Rybnik	3	(3,0,-)
16	Bolesław Proch	Bydgoszcz	2	(0,-,2)

=== Junior Championship ===
- winner - Zbigniew Błażejczak

=== Silver Helmet ===
- winner - Ryszard Franczyszyn

=== Bronze Helmet ===
- winner - Zbigniew Błażejczak

== Pairs ==
=== Polish Pairs Speedway Championship ===
The 1985 Polish Pairs Speedway Championship was the 1985 edition of the Polish Pairs Speedway Championship. The final was held on 6 June at Rybnik.

Pos	Team	Pts	Riders
1	Wybrzeże Gdańsk	25	Zenon Plech 15, Grzegorz Dzikowski 10
2	Unia Leszno	21	Zenon Kasprzak 17, Piotr Pawlicki Sr. 4
3	ROW Rybnik	17	Piotr Pyszny 15, Antoni Skupień 1, Henryk Bem 1
4	Falubaz Zielona Góra	17	Andrzej Huszcza 9, Jan Krzystyniak 2, Maciej Jaworek 6
5	Polonia Bydgoszcz	16	Bolesław Proch 13, Zdzisław Rutecki 2, Ryszard Buśkiewicz 1
6	Śląsk Świętochłowice	15	Jerzy Kochman 13, Krzysztof Zarzecki 2, Marek Mierkiewicz 0
7	Apator Toruń	15	Wojciech Żabiałowicz 12, Tadeusz Wiśniewski 3, Grzegorz Śniegowski 0

== Team ==
=== Team Speedway Polish Championship ===
The 1985 Team Speedway Polish Championship was the 1985 edition of the Team Polish Championship.

Falubaz Zielona Góra won the gold medal. The team included Andrzej Huszcza, Maciej Jaworek and Jan Krzystyniak.

=== First League ===
Pos	Club	Pts	W	D	L	+/−
1	Falubaz Zielona Góra	27	13	1	4	+232
2	Wybrzeże Gdańsk	26	12	2	4	+215
3	Unia Leszno	25	11	3	4	+220
4	Polonia Bydgoszcz	21	10	1	7	+89
5	Apator Toruń	18	9	0	9	+14
6	ROW Rybnik	16	7	2	9	+12
7	Stal Rzeszów	16	8	0	10	–67
8	Stal Gorzów Wielkopolski	16	8	0	10	–126
9	Kolejarz Opole	8	3	2	13	–328
10	Śląsk Świętochłowice	7	3	1	14	–261

=== Second League ===
Pos	Club	Pts	W	D	L	+/−
1	Unia Tarnów	20	10	0	2	+202
2	Motor Lublin	18	9	0	3	+223
3	Start Gniezno	16	8	0	4	+102
4	Ostrovia Ostrów	14	7	0	5	+74
5	Włókniarz Częstochowa	8	4	0	8	–19
6	GKM Grudziądz	8	4	0	8	–126
7	Sparta Wrocław	0	0	0	12	–456
