= 1991 Polish speedway season =

Motorcycle racing competition

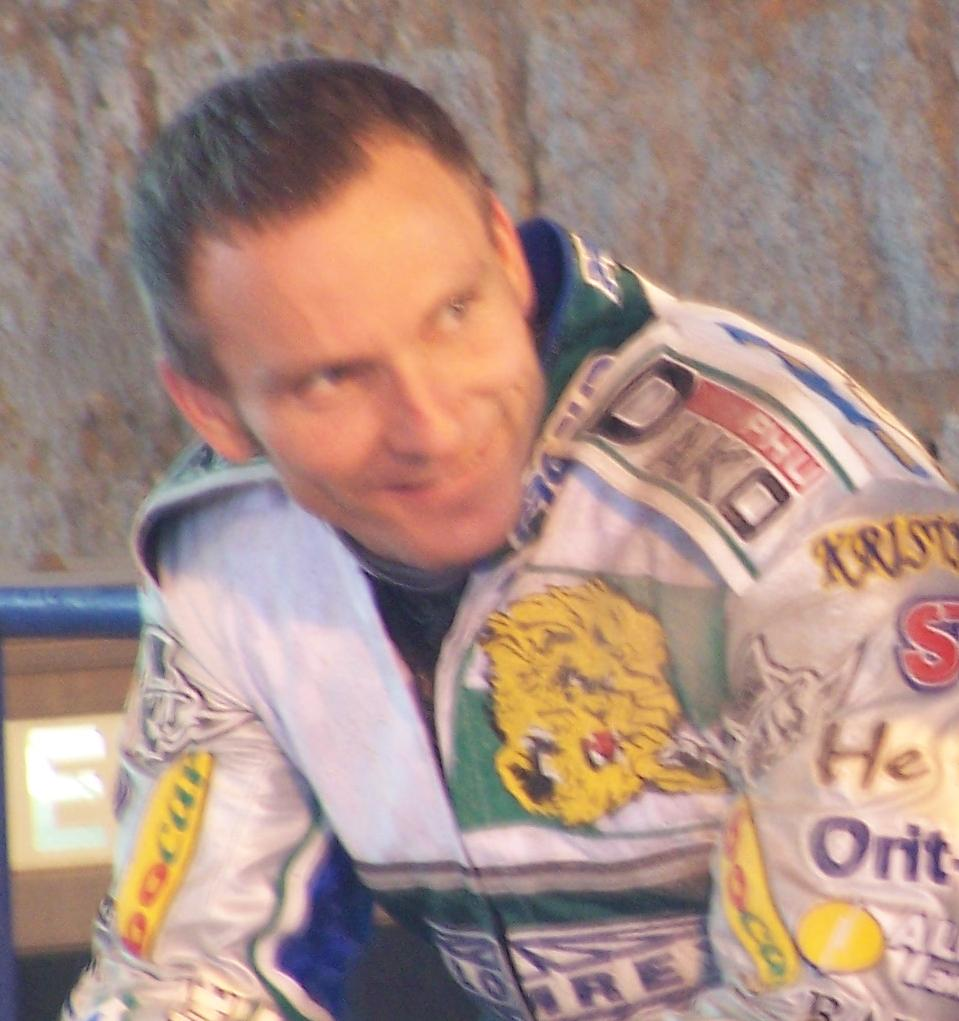
- Sławomir Drabik; 1991 Polish champion and Golden Helmet winner

The 1991 Polish Speedway season was the 1991 season of motorcycle speedway in Poland.

== Individual ==
=== Polish Individual Speedway Championship ===
The 1991 Individual Speedway Polish Championship final was held on 15 August at Toruń.

Pos.	Rider	Club	Total	Points
1	Sławomir Drabik	Częstochowa	15	(3,3,3,3,3)
2	Wojciech Załuski	Opole	11 +3	(2,1,2,3,3)
3	Sławomir Dudek	Zielona Góra	11 +2	(2,3,1,3,2)
4	Tomasz Gollob	Bydgoszcz	9	(3,w,3,1,2)
5	Mirosław Kowalik	Toruń	9	(w,1,3,2,3)
6	Jacek Rempała	Tarnów	9	(3,2,1,w,3)
7	Dariusz Śledź	Lublin	8	(2,0,3,2,1)
8	Roman Jankowski	Leszno	7	(1,3,0,2,1)
9	Adam Pawliczek	Rybnik	7	(2,2,2,d,1)
10	Piotr Świst	Gorzów Wlkp.	6	(3,1,0,1,1)
11	Robert Kużdżał	Tarnów	5	(0,1,2,d,2)
12	Jacek Gollob	Bydgoszcz	4	(1,0,2,1,0)
13	Marek Mróz	Opole	4	(1,2,1,0,0)
14	Eugeniusz Skupień	Rybnik	3	(1,0,0,2,0)
15	Dariusz Fliegert	Rybnik	3	(0,2,1,0,0)
16	Jan Krzystyniak	Rzeszów	0	(w,–,–,–,–)
17	Leszek Matysiak (res)	Świętochłowice	8	(3,3,2)
18	Jacek Krzyżaniak (res)	Toruń	1	(0,1)

=== Golden Helmet ===
The 1991 Golden Golden Helmet (Polish: Turniej o Złoty Kask, ZK) organised by the Polish Motor Union (PZM) was the 1991 event for the league's leading riders. The final was held over two rounds.

Pos.	Rider	Club	Total	Points
1	Sławomir Drabik	Częstochowa	27	(13,14)
2	Andrzej Huszcza	Zielona Góra	21	(10,11)
3	Piotr Pawlicki	Leszno	17 +3	(5,12)
4	Wojciech Załuski	Opole	17 +2	(7,10)
5	Robert Sawina	Toruń	14	(7,7)
6	Piotr Świst	Gorzów Wlkp.	13	(7,6)
7	Dariusz Fliegert	Rybnik	13	(7,6)
8	Mirosław Kowalik	Toruń	12	(8,4)
9	Jacek Gollob	Bydgoszcz	11	(6,5)
10	Dariusz Śledź	Lublin	10	(9,1)
11	Jan Krzystyniak	Rzeszów	7	(4,3)
12	Zenon Kasprzak	Leszno	3	(3,–)

=== Junior Championship ===
- winner - Tomasz Gollob

=== Silver Helmet ===
- winner - Jacek Rempała

=== Bronze Helmet ===
- winner - Adam Łabędzki

== Pairs ==
=== Polish Pairs Speedway Championship ===
The 1991 Polish Pairs Speedway Championship was the 1991 edition of the Polish Pairs Speedway Championship. The final was held on 1 May at Bydgoszcz.

Pos	Team	Pts	Riders
1	Polonia Bydgoszcz	21	Tomasz Gollob 12, Jacek Woźniak 0, Ryszard Dołomisiewicz 9
2	Unia Leszno	19	Roman Jankowski 14, Zenon Kasprzak 3, Adam Łabędzki 2
3	Apator Toruń	15	Jacek Krzyżaniak 8, Mirosław Kowalik 4, Robert Sawina 3
4	Motor Lublin	13	Dariusz Stenka 8, Marek Kępa 1, Dariusz Śledź 4
5	Stal Westa Rzeszów	12	Jan Krzystyniak 8, Janusz Stachyra 4
6	Stal Gorzów Wlkp.	10	Piotr Świst 7, Ryszard Franczyszyn 1, Jarosław Gała 2

== Team ==
=== Team Speedway Polish Championship ===
The 1991 Team Speedway Polish Championship was the 1991 edition of the Team Polish Championship. ZKŻ Zielona Góra won the gold medal. The team included Lars Gunnestad, Andrzej Huszcza and Jimmy Nilsen.

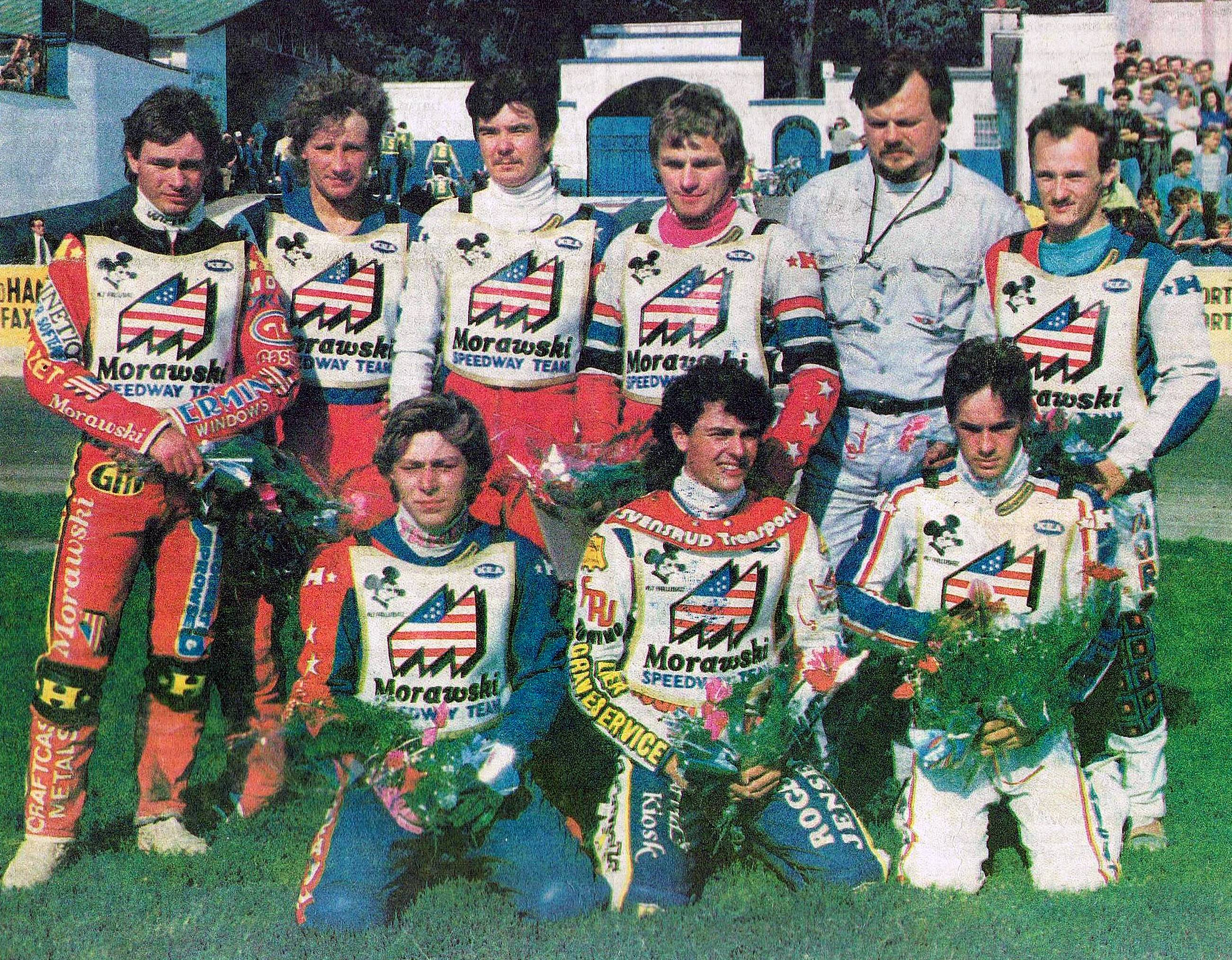
Champions:Zielona Góra team photo

=== First Division ===
Pos	Team	Pts	W	D	L	Diff
1	ZKŻ Zielona Góra	21	10	1	3	+139
2	Motor Lublin	18	9	0	5	+60
3	Apator Toruń	16	7	2	5	+114
4	Stal Gorzów Wielkopolski	16	8	0	6	–6
5	Polonia Bydgoszcz	14	7	0	7	+34
6	Unia Tarnów	13	6	1	7	–61
7	Unia Leszno	12	6	0	8	–40
8	ROW Rybnik	2	1	0	13	–240

=== Second Division ===
Pos	Team	Pts	W	D	L	Diff
1	Stal Rzeszów	39	19	1	2	+475
2	Włókniarz Częstochowa	36	18	0	4	+236
3	Wybrzeże Gdańsk	34	17	0	5	+211
4	Sparta Wrocław	31	15	1	6	+29
5	Kolejarz Opole	26	13	0	9	+129
6	KKŻ Krosno	19	9	1	12	–18
7	Polonia Bydgoszcz II	18	9	0	13	–212
8	Start Gniezno	16	8	0	14	–99
9	GKM Grudziądz	15	7	1	14	–181
10	Śląsk Świętochłowice	12	5	2	15	–206
11	Polonez Poznań	12	6	0	16	–266
12	Ostrów Wielkopolski	6	3	0	19	–367
