= Słaboń =

Słaboń is a surname. Notable people with the surname include:

- Krzysztof Słaboń (born 1981), Polish speedway rider
- Robert Słaboń (born 1953), Polish speedway rider
