= 1973 Polish speedway season =

Motorcycle racing competition

The 1973 Polish Speedway season was the 1973 season of motorcycle speedway in Poland.

== Individual ==
=== Polish Individual Speedway Championship ===
The 1973 Individual Speedway Polish Championship final was held on 30 September at Rybnik.

Pos.	Rider	Club	Total	Points
1	Andrzej Wyglenda	Rybnik	15	(3,3,3,3,3)
2	Jerzy Gryt	Rybnik	14	(3,2,3,3,3)
3	Boguslaw Nowak	Gorzów Wlkp.	11	(3,1,2,2,3)
4	Edward Jancarz	Gorzów Wlkp.	10	(w,3,2,3,2)
5	Henryk Glücklich	Bydgoszcz	9	(2,3,3,d,1)
6	Zbigniew Marcinkowski	Zielona Góra	9	(2,2,1,1,3)
7	Jan Mucha	Świętochłowice	9	(2,1,2,2,2)
8	Bernard Jader	Leszno	8	(1,0,3,3,1)
9	Zenon Plech	Gorzów Wlkp.	7	(3,2,0,0,2)
10	Paweł Waloszek	Świętochłowice	6	(2,2,2,0,0)
11	Leszek Marsz	Gdańsk	6	(1,1,0,2,2)
12	Andrzej Tkocz	Rybnik	5	(1,3,1,0,0)
13	Zdzisław Dobrucki	Leszno	3	(0,0,1,1,1)
14	Stanisław Kasa	Bydgoszcz	3	(0,1,d,1,1)
15	Ryszard Fabiszewski	Gorzów Wlkp.	2	(0,0,w,2,0)
16	Piotr Pyszny	Rybnik	2	(1,u,1,u,–)
17	Paweł Protasiewicz (res)	Zielona Góra	0	(0)

=== Golden Helmet ===
The 1973 Golden Golden Helmet (Polish: Turniej o Złoty Kask, ZK) organised by the Polish Motor Union (PZM) was the 1973 event for the league's leading riders.

Calendar

Date	Venue	Winner
5 April	Gorzów Wlkp.	Zenon Plech (Gorzów Wlkp.)
26 April	Leszno	Zenon Plech (Gorzów Wlkp.)
3 May	Zielona Góra	Zbigniew Marcinkowski (Zielona Góra)
10 May	Częstochowa	Jerzy Szczakiel (Opole)
24 May	Częstochowa	Zenon Plech (Gorzów Wlkp.)
31 May	Chorzów	Edward Jancarz (Gorzów Wlkp.)
14 June	Bydgoszcz	Zenon Plech (Gorzów Wlkp.)
16 August	Chorzów	Paweł Waloszek (Świętochłowice)

Final classification Note: Result from final score was subtracted with two the weakest events.

Pos.	Rider	Club	Total	GOR	LES	ZIE	OPO	CZE	CHO	BYD	CHO
1	Zenon Plech	Stal Gorzów Wlkp.	80	12	15	11	14	14	10	14	2
2	Edward Jancarz	Stal Gorzów Wlkp.	67	8	13	2	13	10	14	3	9
3	Jan Mucha	Śląsk Świętochłowice	66	9	11	13	11	10	11	10	5
4	Jerzy Szczakiel	Kolejarz Opole	62	9	3	-	15	11	-	14	10
5	Paweł Waloszek	Śląsk Świętochłowice	59	4	9	8	5	9	11	8	14
6	Andrzej Tkocz	ROW Rybnik	54	10	5	8	10	5	7	9	10
7	Marek Cieślak	Włókniarz Częstochowa	53	12	9	6	7	12	7	3	0
8	Henryk Glücklich	Polonia Bydgoszcz	53	11	9	5	8	11	4	9	-
9	Zbigniew Marcinkowski	Falubaz Zielona Góra	52	6	6	13	8	4	11	8	-
10	Andrzej Wyglenda	ROW Rybnik	51	8	2	8	8	4	9	-	14
11	Henryk Żyto	Wybrzeże Gdańsk	41	6	5	5	2	4	12	8	5
12	Jerzy Kowalski	Unia Leszno	39	4	3	6	5	8	4	12	3
13	Zdzisław Dobrucki	Unia Leszno	39	4	10	9	4	5	-	4	7
14	Bernard Jąder	Unia Leszno	37	4	10	10	3	4	3	2	6
15	Leszek Marsz	Wybrzeże Gdańsk	32	1	2	8	3	5	8	3	5

=== Junior Championship ===
- winner - Zbigniew Filipiak

=== Silver Helmet ===
- winner - Zbigniew Filipiak

== Team ==
=== Team Speedway Polish Championship ===
The 1973 Team Speedway Polish Championship was the 1973 edition of the Team Polish Championship.

Stal Gorzów Wielkopolski won the gold medal. The team included Zenon Plech, Edward Jancarz, Bogusław Nowak and Ryszard Fabiszewski.

=== First League ===
Pos	Club	Pts	W	D	L	+/−
1	Stal Gorzów Wielkopolski	24	12	0	2	+138
2	Śląsk Świętochłowice	16	8	0	6	+145
3	Falubaz Zielona Góra	16	8	0	6	–86
4	ROW Rybnik	15	7	1	6	+110
5	Unia Leszno	13	6	1	7	–37
6	Włókniarz Częstochowa	11	5	1	8	–48
7	Polonia Bydgoszcz	9	4	1	9	–63
8	Kolejarz Opole	8	3	2	9	–159

=== Second League ===
Pos	Club	Pts	W	D	L	+/−
1	Sparta Wrocław	25	12	1	1	+289
2	Stal Toruń	20	10	0	4	+172
3	Wybrzeże Gdańsk	17	8	1	5	+114
4	Unia Tarnów	14	7	0	7	+37
5	Stal Rzeszów	12	6	0	8	–57
6	Motor Lublin	12	6	0	8	–142
7	Gwardia Łódź	8	4	0	10	–159
8	Start Gniezno	4	2	0	12	–254
