= Polish Pairs Speedway Championship =

Polish motorcycle speedway event

- Sport: motorcycle speedway
- Founded: 1974
- Country: Poland
- Most recent champion: Motor Lublin

The Polish Pairs Speedway Championship (Polish: Mistrzostwa Polski Par Klubowych, MPPK) is an annual speedway event held each year in different Polish clubs organized by the Polish Motor Union (PZM) since 1974.

The participating teams are drawn into three groups; each staging a pairs competition. The top two teams in each group qualify for the Final. A host team chosen by the GKSŻ is seeded directly to the Final. The team winning the Final is awarded a gold medal and declared Polish Pairs Champions. Teams finishing second and third are awarded silver and bronze medals respectively.

== Previous winners ==
Year	Venue	Winners	Runner-up	3rd place
1974	Bydgoszcz	Polonia Bydgoszcz	Stal Gorzów Wlkp.	ROW Rybnik
1975	Leszno	Stal Gorzów Wlkp.	Sparta Wrocław	ROW Rybnik
1976	Gdańsk	Stal Gorzów Wlkp.	Sparta Wrocław	Włókniarz Częstochowa
1977	Ostrów Wlkp.	Stal Gorzów Wlkp.	Włókniarz Częstochowa	Kolejarz Opole
1978	Chorzów	Stal Gorzów Wlkp.	Unia Leszno	Sparta Wrocław
1979	Gniezno	Falubaz Zielona Góra	Polonia Bydgoszcz	Start Gniezno
1980	Zielona Góra	Unia Leszno	Stal Gorzów Wlkp.	Start Gniezno
1981	Toruń	Stal Gorzów Wlkp.	Apator Toruń	Kolejarz Opole
1982	Gorzów Wlkp.	Falubaz Zielona Góra	Unia Leszno	Stal Gorzów Wlkp.
1983	Zielona Góra	Falubaz Zielona Góra	Śląsk Świętochłowice	Stal Gorzów Wlkp.
1984	Toruń	Unia Leszno	Stal Gorzów Wlkp.	Wybrzeże Gdańsk
1985	Rybnik	Wybrzeże Gdańsk	Unia Leszno	ROW Rybnik
1986	Toruń	Apator Toruń	Wybrzeże Gdańsk	Falubaz Zielona Góra
1987	Ostrów Wlkp.	Unia Leszno	Stal Gorzów Wlkp.	Wybrzeże Gdańsk
1988	Rybnik	Unia Leszno	ROW Rybnik	Stal Gorzów Wlkp.
1989	Leszno	Unia Leszno	Stal Rzeszów	Stal Gorzów Wlkp.
1990	Rzeszów	Polonia Bydgoszcz	Stal Rzeszów	ROW Rybnik
1991	Bydgoszcz	Polonia Bydgoszcz	Unia Leszno	Apator Toruń
1992	Gorzów Wlkp.	Stal Gorzów Wlkp.	Polonia Bydgoszcz	Apator Toruń
1993	Grudziądz	Polonia-Jutrzenka Bydgoszcz	Morawski Zielona Góra	Apator-Elektrim Toruń
1994	Leszno	Polonia-Jutrzenka Bydgoszcz	Unia Leszno	Stal-Brunat Gorzów Wlkp.
1995	Częstochowa	Polonia-Jutrzenka Bydgoszcz	Sparta-Polsat Wrocław	Apator-Elektrim Toruń
1996	Gniezno	Polonia-Jutrzenka Bydgoszcz	Start Gniezno	Apator-DGG Toruń
1997	Bydgoszcz	Jutrzenka-Polonia Bydgoszcz	Apator-DGG Toruń	Pergo Gorzów Wlkp.
1998	Gorzów Wlkp.	Pergo Gorzów Wlkp.	Jutrzenka-Polonia Bydgoszcz	Trilux-Start Gniezno
1999	Leszno	Jutrzenka-Polonia Bydgoszcz	Unia Leszno	Atlas Wrocław
2000	Wrocław	Polonia Bydgoszcz	Lotos-Wybrzeże Gdańsk	Włókniarz Częstochowa
2001	Piła	Atlas Wrocław	Polonia Bydgoszcz	Włókniarz Częstochowa
2002	Wrocław	Point S-Polonia Bydgoszcz	Apator-Adriana Toruń	Włókniarz Częstochowa
2003	Leszno	Unia Leszno	ZKŻ Quick-mix Zielona Góra	Apator-Adriana Toruń
2004	Toruń	Apator-Adriana Toruń	Unia Tarnów	Lotos Gdańsk
2005	Wrocław	Marma Polskie Folie Rzeszów	Budlex-Polonia Bydgoszcz	KM Intar Ostrów Wlkp.
2006	Bydgoszcz	Włókniarz Częstochowa	Budlex-Polonia Bydgoszcz	RKM Rybnik
2007	Częstochowa	Unia Tarnów	Atlas Wrocław	Unia Leszno
2008	Toruń	Unibax Toruń	Unia Leszno	ZKŻ Kronopol Zielona Góra
2009	Zielona Góra	Falubaz Zielona Góra	Unia Tarnów	Unia Leszno
2010	Toruń	Unibax Toruń	Stal Rzeszów	Polonia Bydgoszcz
2011	Zielona Góra	WTS Wrocław	ZKŻ Zielona Góra	PSŻ Poznań
2012	Leszno	Unia Leszno	ZKŻ Zielona Góra	GTŻ Grudziądz
2013	Gorzów Wielkopolski	Unia Tarnów	Stal Gorzów Wielkopolski	WTS Wrocław
2014	Gorzów Wielkopolski	Stal Gorzów Wielkopolski	Unibax Toruń	Unia Tarnów
2015	Leszno	Unia Leszno	Stal Gorzów Wielkopolski	Unia Tarnów
2016	Rawicz	WTS Wrocław	Unia Leszno	KS Toruń
2017	Ostrów Wielkopolski	Stal Gorzów Wielkopolski	ZKŻ Zielona Góra	GKM Grudziądz
2018	Ostrów Wielkopolski	WTS Wrocław	ZKŻ Zielona Góra	Włókniarz Częstochowa
2019	Bydgoszcz	Unia Leszno	Stal Gorzów Wielkopolski	Polonia Bydgoszcz
2020	Gdańsk	Unia Leszno	ZKŻ Zielona Góra	WTS Wrocław
2021	Grudziądz	GKM Grudziądz	Włókniarz Częstochowa	ZKŻ Zielona Góra
2022	Poznań	Motor Lublin	Unia Leszno	GKM Grudziądz
2023	Rzeszów	Motor Lublin	Unia Leszno	Włókniarz Częstochowa
2024	Poznań	Motor Lublin	KS Toruń	WTS Sparta Wrocław
2025	Grudziadz	Motor Lublin	GKM Grudziądz	KS Toruń
2026	Gdańsk	Motor Lublin	GKM Grudziądz	Unia Leszno

== Titles by club ==
Club	Champions	Winning years
Polonia Bydgoszcz	11	1974, 1990, 1991, 1993, 1994, 1995, 1996, 1997, 1999, 2000, 2002
Stal Gorzów Wielkopolski	10	1973, 1975, 1976, 1977, 1978, 1981, 1992, 1998, 2014, 2017
Unia Leszno	10	1980, 1984, 1987, 1988, 1989, 2003, 2012, 2015, 2019, 2020
Speedway Lublin	5	2022, 2023, 2024, 2025, 2026
Falubaz Zielona Góra	4	1979, 1982, 1983, 2009
KS Toruń	4	1986, 2004, 2008, 2010
Sparta Wrocław	4	2001, 2011, 2016, 2018
Unia Tarnów	2	2007, 2013
Wybrzeże Gdańsk	1	1985
Stal Rzeszów	1	2005
Włókniarz Częstochowa	1	2006
GKM Grudziądz	1	2021
