= Krępa, Lubusz Voivodeship =

Krępa
- District of Zielona Góra
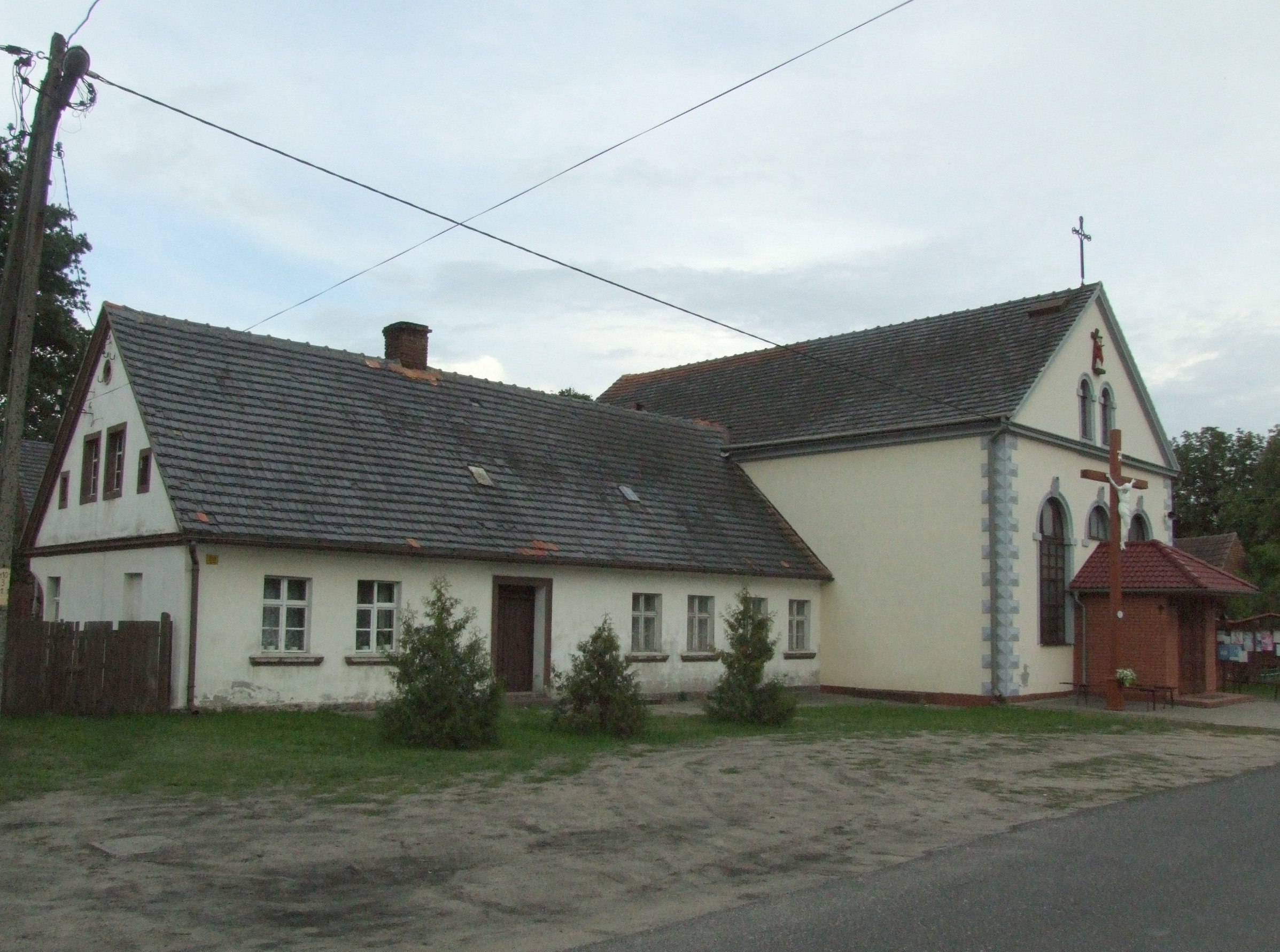
- The church in Krępa

- Location within Poland Location within Lubusz Voivodeship
- Coordinates: 52°0′N 15°32′E
- Country: Poland
- Voivodeship: Lubusz
- County/City: Zielona Góra
- Population: 671
- Time zone: UTC+1 (CET)
  - Summer (DST): UTC+2 (CEST)
- Postal code: 66-001
- Area code: +48 68
- Vehicle registration: FZ

Krępa [ˈkrɛmpa] is a district of the city of Zielona Góra, in western Poland, located in the northern part of the city. It was a separate village until 2014.

Krępa has a population of 671.

== Notable people ==
- Andrzej Huszcza (born 1957), Polish retired speedway rider
