= Andrzej Tkocz =

Polish speedway rider

- Born: 28 September 1951 (age 75); Rybnik, Poland
- Nationality: Polish

Career history

Poland
- 1970-1984: ROW Rybnik

Great Britain
- 1978-1979: Poole Pirates

Individual honours
- 1972: Poland Silver Helmet Winner

Team honours
- 1974: Speedway World Team Cup bronze medal
- 1970, 1972: Polish League Champion

Andrzej Tkocz (born 28 September 1951) is a former international speedway rider from Poland. He earned 18 international caps for the Poland national speedway team.

== Speedway career ==
Tkocz toured the United Kingdom during Poland's 1973 tour when the Poles created significant interest over their fearless riding styles.

Tkocz won a bronze medal at the Speedway World Team Cup in the 1974 Speedway World Team Cup.

Tkocz rode in the top tier of British Speedway from 1978 to 1979, riding for Poole Pirates.

== World final appearances ==
=== World Team Cup ===
- 1974 - (Poland) Chorzów, Silesian Stadium (with Zenon Plech / Jan Mucha / Andrzej Jurczyński / Jerzy Szczakiel) - 3rd - 13pt (2)
- 1979 – (England) London, White City Stadium (with Piotr Pyszny / Robert Słaboń / Marek Cieślak / Zenon Plech) – 4th – 11pts (0)

== Family ==
His older brothers Stanisław and Jan Tkocz were both speedway riders.
