= Falubaz Zielona Góra =

Polish motorcycle speedway team

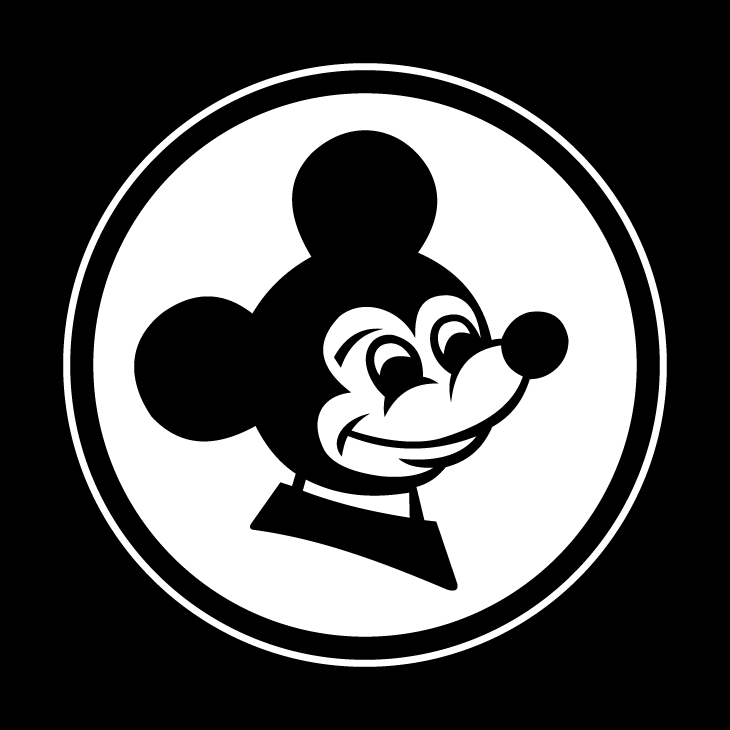

Club information
- Track address: Stadion Żużlowy w Zielonej Górze ul. Wrocławska 69; 65-019 Zielona Góra
- Country: Poland
- Founded: 1946 (as MKS); 1961 (as Zgrzeblarki)
- Team manager: Mariusz Staszewski
- Team captain: Andžejs Ļebedevs
- League: Ekstraliga
- Website: Official site

Club facts
- Colours: Yellow, White, Green
- Nickname: Myszy (Mice); Żółto Biało Zieloni (Yellow White and Greens)
- Track size: 334 metres (365 yd)
- Track record time: 59.22 seconds
- Track record date: 3 June 2023
- Track record holder: Przemysław Pawlicki

Major team honours
Polish Team Champions	1981, 1982, 1985, 1991, 2009, 2011, 2013
Pairs champions	2009

Falubaz Zielona Góra is a Polish motorcycle speedway team based in Zielona Góra who currently races in PGE Ekstraliga. It is one of the most successful teams in Poland, winning seven Team Speedway Polish Championships (latest in 2013). It is commonly known as Falubaz due to one of its former names.

== Stadium ==
The Zielona Góra Speedway Stadium, informally named as W69, is located on 69 Wrocławska Street. It contains 15,000 seats. The track is 337.50 metres long and has a granite surface. It has had an inflatable airfence since May 4, 2006. The stadium was later renovated with floodlights erected and the track widened on the bends. The club's new headquarters were also built and moved from 31 Dworcowa Street.

== History ==
=== 1946 to 1979 ===
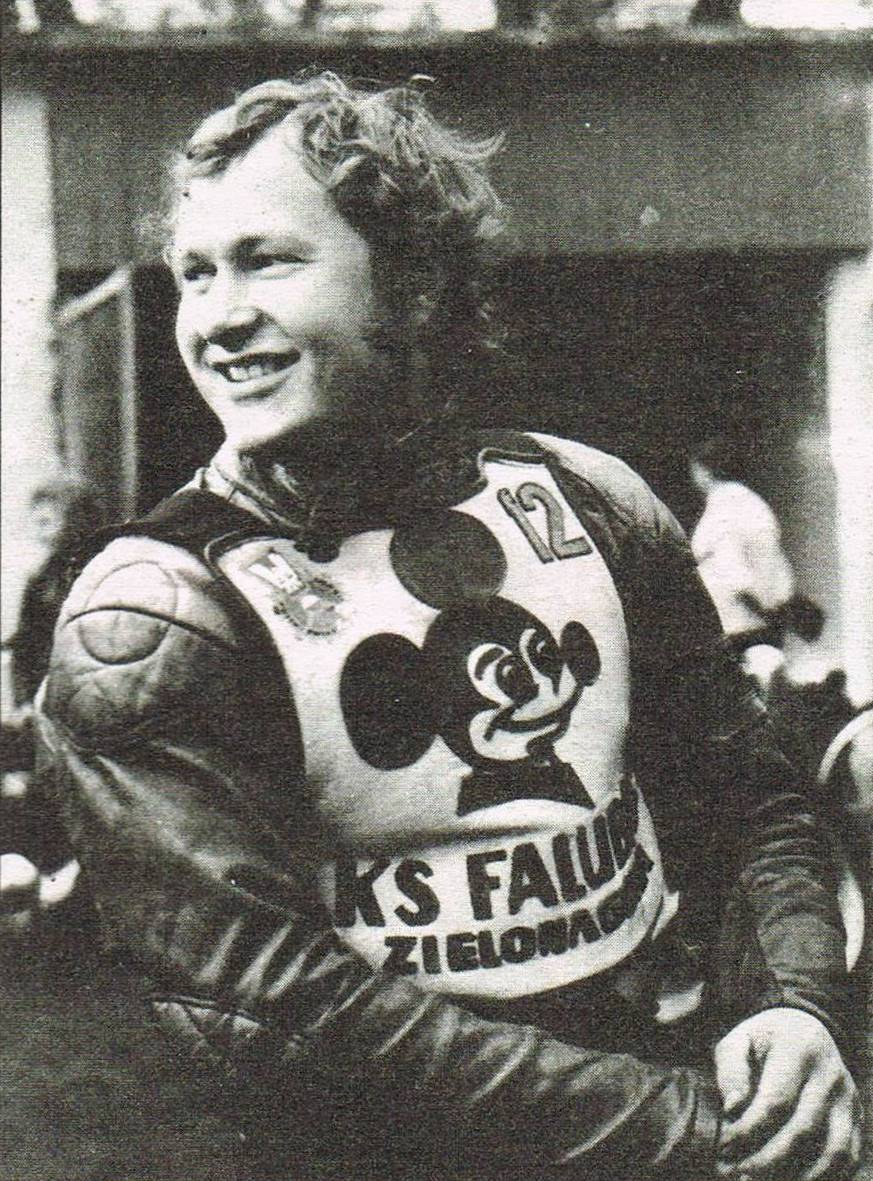
Zbigniew Filipiak, rider from 1969 to 1981

The club was founded in 1946 with the establishing of a motorcycle department of Militia Sports Club (Polish Milicyjny Klub Sportowy). The first speedway race in the city took place on a 450 meters long track on October 20, 1946. The winner was Zygmunt Dolata as he holds best time of the meeting.

In 1947, Mieczysław Chlebicz, a re-emigrant from the United Kingdom, arrived back in the city, bringing the first professional speedway motorcycle which had been used in Britain. In 1948, a Poznan District League was set up, containing nine teams, including Unia Zielona Góra. The club's riders were (in alphabetical order): Jerzy Błoch, Mieczysław Chlebicz, Kazimierz Juzala, Alfons Kostusiak, Ksawery Sawicki, Józef Śmigielski, Stanisław Świstak and Marian Zadoń.

Second division honours were won in 1963/1964, 1971, 1975 and 1977. In between they won the bronze medal in the Team Speedway Polish Championship in 1973 and in 1979 they won their second bronze medal.

=== 1980 to 1999 ===
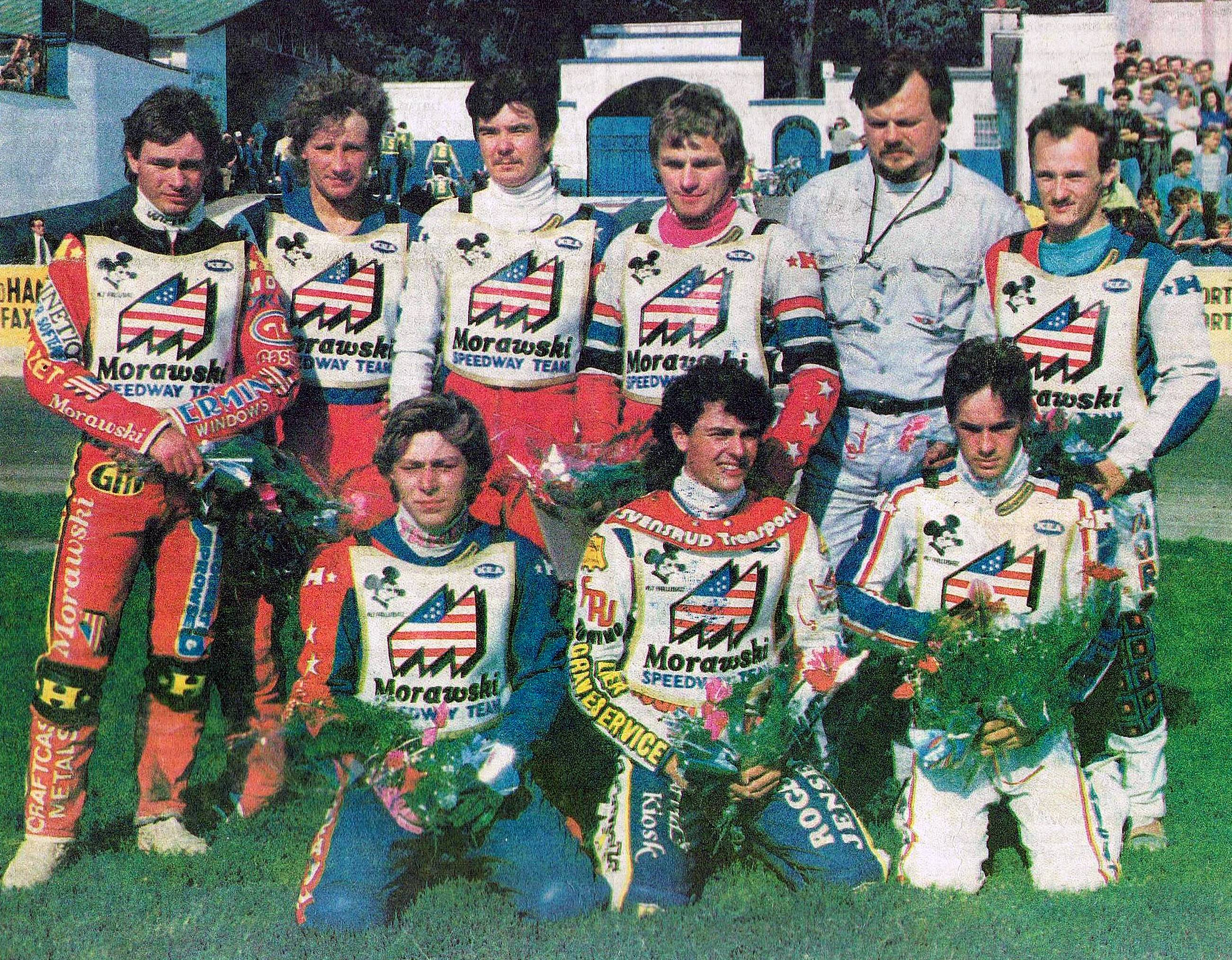
1991 championship team

The 1980s saw a period of significant success for the club; they won their first team gold medal in 1981 and followed this up by defending their crown in 1982. In addition, Andrzej Huszcza won the 1982 Polish Individual Speedway Championship. Other riders at the time included Henryk Olszak, Maciej Jaworek and Jan Krzystyniak.

Just three years later in 1985 they secured a third gold medal and Maciej Jaworek was Polish champion in 1986. The good form continued as they picked up a silver medal in 1989 before winning a fourth Championship gold medal in 1991. The period of success was followed by nine seasons of mediocrity.

=== 2000 to 2007 ===
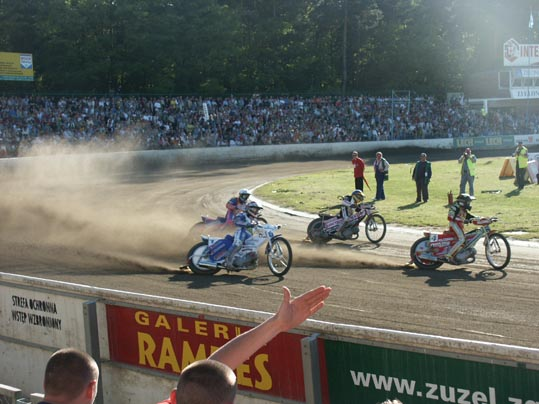
versus Unia Leszno in 2004

When the Ekstraliga was introduced in 2000, Zielona Gora were in 1. Liga but were able to win the division and return to the top league for 2001. However they bounced back and forth from the divisions winning the 1.Liga in both 2002 and 2006. Rafał Okoniewski won the Golden Helmet in 2003.

=== 2008 to present ===
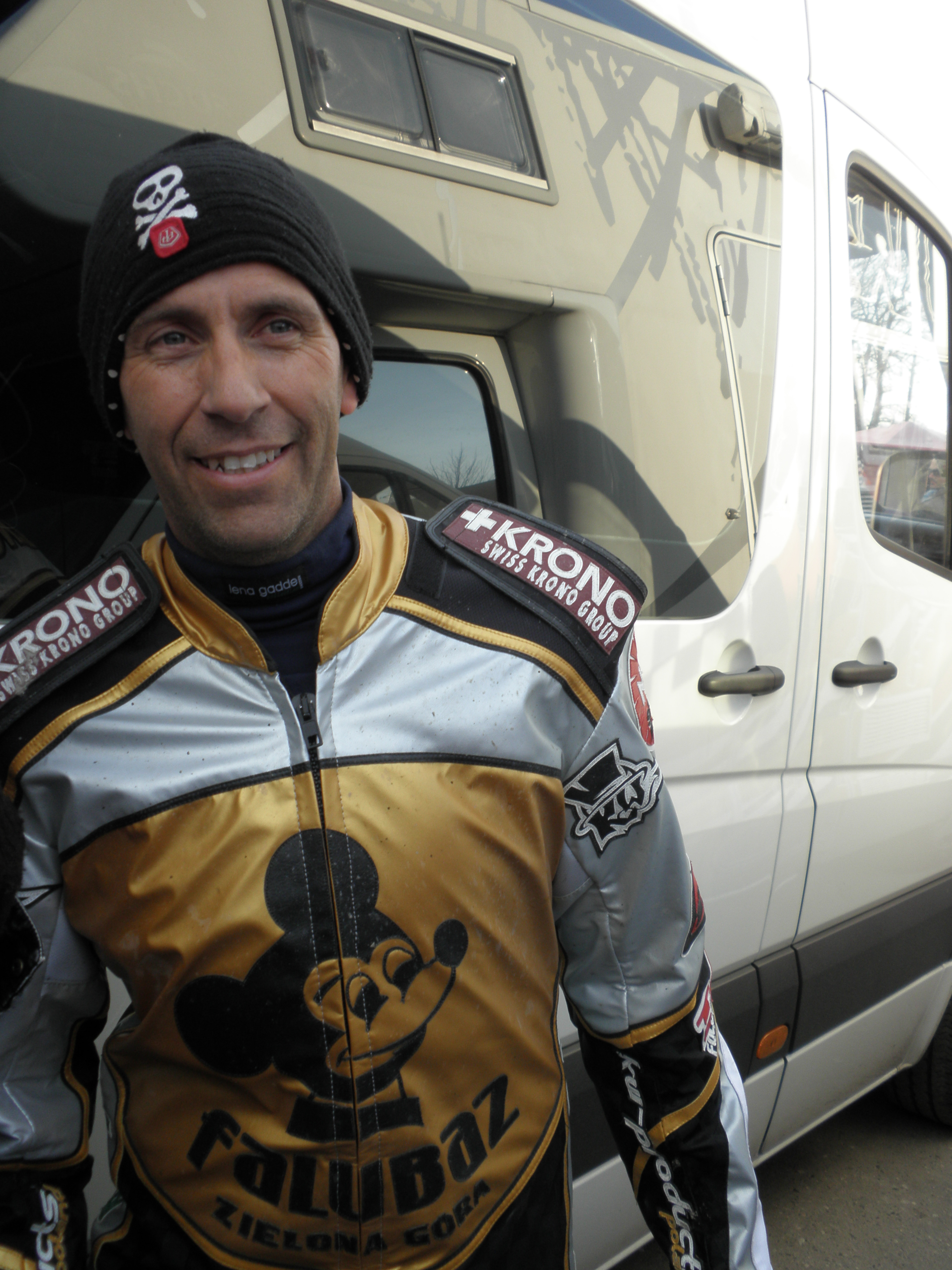
Greg Hancock in 2010

It was not until 2008 that they won a top league honour, winning the bronze medal, before being crowned champions of Poland in 2009 for the fifth time in their history.

The team then embarked on another superb run, winning the Polish Pairs Speedway Championship in 2009 (Rafał Dobrucki and Grzegorz Walasek), team silver in 2010, gold in 2011 and 2013. Some of the star riders at the time were former world champion Greg Hancock, Swede, Andreas Jonsson and Piotr Protasiewicz.

During celebrations of the team's 2011 victory, a fan was accidentally run over and by an unmarked police vehicle and died, which led to overnight riots.

Patryk Dudek completed the Polish Championship and Golden Helmet double during the 2016 Polish speedway season and the team picked up a bronze medal.

In 2021 the team were relegated from the Ekstraliga after a 14-year stay.

In their first season in the 1. Liga Falubaz failed to gain promotion back to the top league after losing the promotion play-off final to Wilki Krosno.

In the 2023 season, Falubaz went on to win the league title and get promoted to Ekstraliga after winning all of their 20 matches, becoming only the second club to achieve this feat on the second level after Unia Leszno in 1996.

== Teams ==
=== 2026 Team ===
- (Poland) Przemysław Pawlicki
- (Poland) Dominik Kubera
- (Latvia) Andžejs Ļebedevs
- (Denmark) Leon Madsen
- (Poland) Michał Curzytek
- (Poland) Damian Ratajczak
- (Poland) Oskar Hurysz
- (Australia) Mitchell McDiarmid
- (United Kingdom) William Cairns
- (Denmark) Villads Pedersen
- (United States) Slater Lightcap
- (Poland) Eryk Farański
- (Poland) Bartosz Rudolf
- (Poland) Kacper Witrykus

=== Previous teams ===
Extended content

2022 team

- (Poland) Piotr Protasiewicz
- (Czech Republic) Jan Kvěch
- (Australia) Max Fricke
- (Australia) Rohan Tungate
- (Poland) Mateusz Tonder
- (Poland) Krzysztof Buczkowski
- (Poland) Antoni Mencel
- (Poland) Maksym Borowiak
- (Poland) Fabian Ragus

2023 team

- (Poland) Przemysław Pawlicki
- (Poland) Krzysztof Buczkowski
- (Denmark) Rasmus Jensen
- (Czech Republic) Jan Kvěch
- (Australia) Rohan Tungate
- (United States) Luke Becker
- (Poland) Fabian Ragus
- (Poland) Dawid Rempała
- (Poland) Filip Frącewicz
- (Poland) Kacper Rychliński

2024 team

- (Poland) Przemysław Pawlicki
- (Poland) Jarosław Hampel
- (Denmark) Rasmus Jensen
- (Czech Republic) Jan Kvěch
- (Poland) Piotr Pawlicki
- (Poland) Michał Curzytek
- (Poland) Krzysztof Sadurski
- (Poland) Oskar Hurysz
- (Poland) Kacper Rychliński
- (Poland) Mateusz Łopuski

2025 team

- (Poland) Przemysław Pawlicki
- (Poland) Jarosław Hampel
- (Denmark) Rasmus Jensen
- (Denmark) Jonas Knudsen
- (Denmark) Leon Madsen
- (Poland) Michał Curzytek
- (Poland) Damian Ratajczak
- (Poland) Oskar Hurysz
- (Australia) Mitchell McDiarmid
- (Poland) Eryk Farański
- (Poland) Bartosz Rudolf
- (Poland) Kacper Witrykus

== Notable riders ==
- (Poland) Rafał Dobrucki
- (Poland) Patryk Dudek
- (United States) Greg Hancock
- (Poland) Andrzej Huszcza
- (Poland) Maciej Jaworek
- (Sweden) Andreas Jonsson
- (Poland) Jan Krzystyniak
- (Poland) Rafał Okoniewski
- (Poland) Henryk Olszak
- (Poland) Piotr Protasiewicz
- (Poland) Grzegorz Walasek

== Honours ==
Competitions	Total	Golden medals		Silver medals		Bronze medals
Competitions	Total	Total	Years	Total	Years	Total	Years
Team (DMP) (since 1948)	14	7	1981, 1982, 1985, 1991, 2009, 2011, 2013	2	1989, 2010	5	1973, 1979, 1984, 2008, 2016
Team U-21 (MDMP) (since 1978)	12	5	1980, 1987, 1988, 2019, 2020			7	1979, 1986, 2000, 2003, 2005, 2010, 2014
Pairs (MPPK) (since 1974)	14	4	1979, 1982, 1983, 2009	7	1993, 2003, 2011, 2012, 2017, 2018, 2020	3	1986, 2008, 2021
Pairs U-21 (MMPPK) (1980 U-23; since 1983)	12	4	1988, 2001, 2019, 2020	2	2009, 2011	6	1985, 1989, 1991, 1992, 2002, 2015
Individual (IMP) (since 1948)	14	3	1982, 1986, 2016	2	1980, 1992	9	1980, 1983, 1984, 1985, 1991, 2008, 2010, 2011, 2017
Individual U-21 (MIMP) (since 1967)	18	7	1973, 1975, 1982, 1985, 1997, 2009, 2013	3	1971, 1978, 1989	8	1977, 1981, 1984, 1992, 2008, 2011, 2015, 2020
Total Polish Championship medals: 84		Gold: 30		Silver: 16		Bronze: 38
Competitions	Total	I place		II place		III place
Competitions	Total	Total	Years	Total	Years	Total	Years
European Club (KPE) (since 1998)	1					1	2010
Team Cup (DPP) (?)	1	1	1992
Golden Helmet (ZK) (since 1961)	16	4	1983, 2003, 2007, 2016	4	1989, 1991, 2009, 2011	8	1978, 1983, 1985, 1986, 2000, 2010, 2013, 2019
Silver Helmet U-21 (SK) (since 1966)	28	11	1970, 1971, 1973, 1975, 1977, 1978, 1980, 1982, 1993, 2009, 2016	10	1970, 1978, 1985, 1990, 1991, 2002, 2004, 2007, 2008, 2013	7	1976, 1979, 1981, 1989, 1997, 2001, 2011
Bronze Helmet U-19 (BK) (1976-81; since 1983)	12	3	1985, 2010, 2011	3	1976, 1986, 2009	6	1978, 1986, 1987, 1995, 2000, 2016
