= Leonard Raba =

Polish speedway rider

- Born: 8 December 1954 (age 71); Opole, Poland
- Nationality: Polish

Career history

Poland
- 1973–1986: Kolejarz Opole

Great Britain
- 1978: Swindon Robins

Individual honours
- 1982: Polish Individual Speedway Championship silver

Team honours
- 1984: World Team Cup finalist
- 1974, 1980: 1. Liga

Leonard Raba (born 8 December 1954) is a former motorcycle speedway rider from Poland. He earned ten international caps for the Poland national speedway team.

== Career ==
Raba started his speedway career with Kolejarz Opole during the 1973 Polish speedway season. He spent his entire Polish leagues career with the club and helped them win the 1. Liga in 1974. and 1980

Raba spent one unsuccessful season riding for Swindon Robins, with fellow Pole Jerzy Trzeszkowski in the British speedway leagues, during the 1978 British League season.

In 1982, Raba finished runner-up to Andrzej Huszcza in the Polish Individual Speedway Championship.

Raba ended his speedway career due to injuries (complicated leg fracture) after an accident with Bolesław Proch in 1985, during a league match against Polonia Bydgoszcz.

== World Final appearances ==
=== World Team Cup ===
- 1984 – (Poland) Leszno (with Roman Jankowski / Zenon Kasprzak / Bolesław Proch / Zenon Plech) – 4th – 8pt (0)
