= Robert Słaboń =

Polish speedway rider (1953–2026)

- Born: 15 September 1953; Wrocław, Poland
- Died: 28 June 2026 (aged 72)
- Nationality: Polish

Career history

Poland
- 1975–1982: Sparta Wrocław
- 1983–1984: Motor Lublin

Great Britain
- 1981: Eastbourne Eagles

Individual honours
- 1979: Speedway World Championship finalist
- 1979, 1980: Poland Golden Helmet Winner

Robert Słaboń (15 September 1953 – 28 June 2026) was a Polish international motorcycle speedway rider. He earned 11 international caps for the Poland national speedway team.

== Speedway career ==
Słaboń reached the final of the Speedway World Championship in the 1979 Individual Speedway World Championship. He has twice won the bronze medal at the Polish Individual Speedway Championship.

Słaboń rode in the top tier of British Speedway, riding for Eastbourne Eagles during the 1981 British League season but disappointed scoring a season average of only 2.89.

The majority of Słaboń's career was spent in his native Poland riding for Sparta Wrocław.

== Personal life and death ==
Słaboń died on 28 June 2026, at the age of 72. His son Krzysztof was also a speedway rider.

== World final appearances ==
=== Individual World Championship ===
- 1979 – (Poland) Chorzów, Silesian Stadium – 15th – 2pts

=== World Team Cup ===
- 1979 – (England) London, White City Stadium (with Piotr Pyszny / Zenon Plech / Marek Cieślak / Andrzej Tkocz) – 4th – 11pts (2)
