= Włodzimierz Heliński =

Polish speedway rider (1955–2021)

- Born: 16 July 1955; Leszno, Poland
- Died: 1 May 2021 (aged 65)
- Nationality: Polish

Career history
- 1979–1985: Unia Leszno
- 1988–1990: Start Gniezno

Team honours
- 1979, 1980: Polish League Champion

Włodzimierz Heliński (16 July 1955 – 1 May 2021) was a Polish speedway rider.

== Biography ==
Heliński obtained his speedway license in 1974. In the competition of the Polish team championship (DMP), he represented the clubs of "Unia" Leszno (1979–1985) and "Start" Gniezno. He won seven DMP medals: three gold (1979, 1980, 1984), two silver (1982, 1983) and two bronze (1981, 1985). In 1980, he won the Polish team Cup, and in 1984 in Toruń - the title of the Polish champion of club pairs.

Heliński was promoted to the finals of the individual Polish championships three times, in 1983 (Gdańsk - eighth place), 1984 (Gorzów Wielkopolski - 11th place) and 1990 (Lublin - 12th place). He twice stood on the podium of the Alfred Smoczyk memorials held in Leszno (1980 - second place, 1982 - third place).
