= Maciej Jaworek =

Polish speedway rider

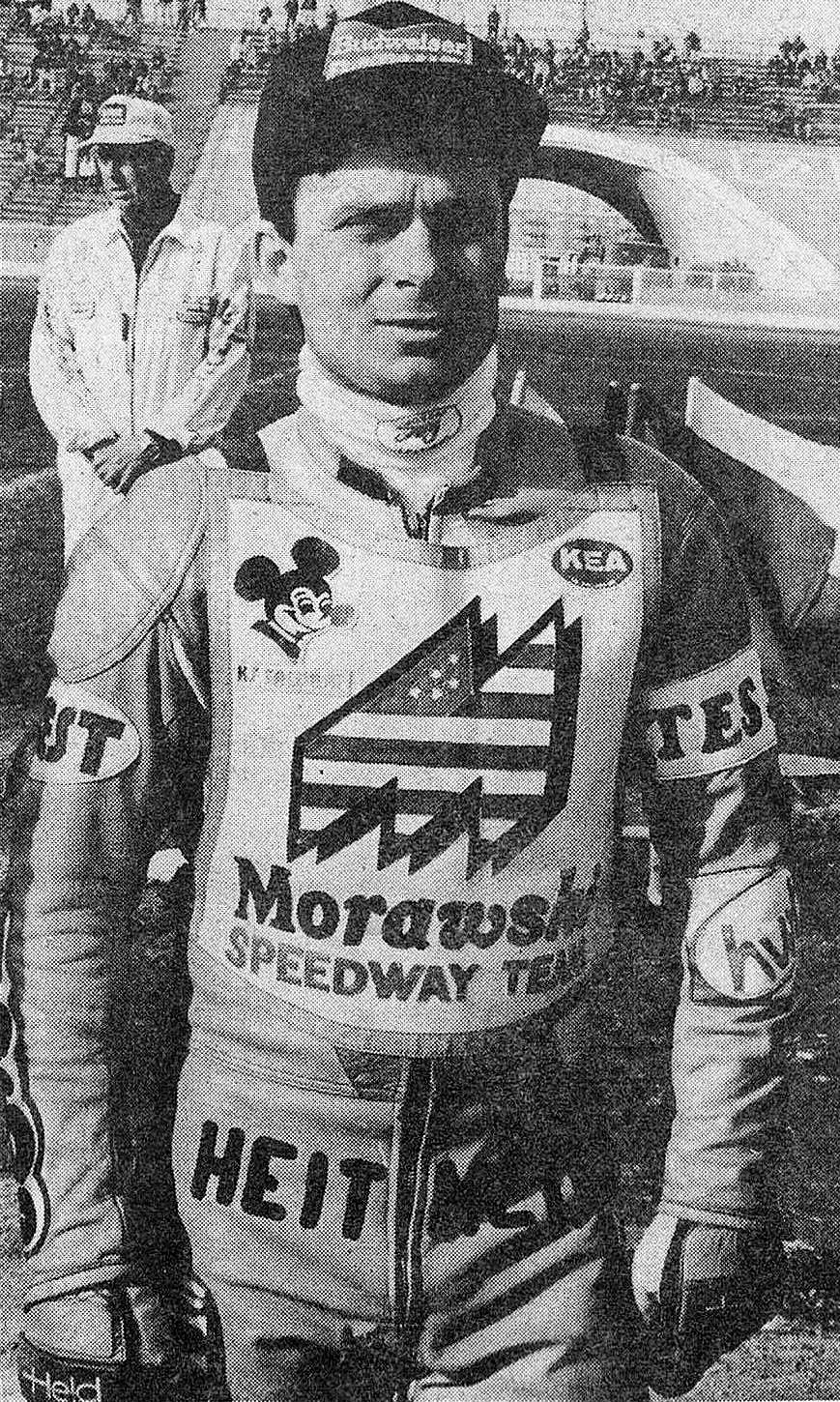
- Born: 24 February 1961 (age 65); Warka, Poland
- Nationality: Polish

Career history
- 1979–1986, 1992–1993: Falubaz Zielona Góra

Individual honours
- 1986: Polish Champion
- 1982: Polish Junior Champion
- 1980, 1982: Poland Silver Helmet Winner

Team honours
- 1981, 1982, 1985: Polish League Champion

Maciej Jaworek (born 24 February 1961) is a former international speedway rider from Poland.

== Speedway career ==
A protégé of Falubaz Zielona Góra, Jaworek started competing for them in 1978, when he obtained his license. Recognized as one of the most dynamic riders of the Zielona Góra club, his career development coincided with the club's successes. Following the departure of Henryk Olszak, he, along with Andrzej Huszcza and Jan Krzystyniak, became known as the "three musketeers," forming the backbone of Zielona Góra's speedway strength.

In the national speedway scene, Jaworek won almost everything. He was open to innovations from the West and effectively utilized the technical capabilities of the English Weslake factory. His talent developed during a period marked by the financial and technological decline of Polish speedway, largely due to international isolation and limited access to Western markets. This technological gap was a primary reason why he did not achieve international success.

In the Zielona Góra Falubaz team, Jaworek gradually climbed the internal hierarchy. In 1985, he gained the title of the unofficial leader, surpassing his club colleagues, Polish pair champions Krzystyniak and Huszcza, in the final of the Individual Speedway Polish Championship in Gorzów Wielkopolski. He also represented the Polish national team.

The peak of Jaworek's career came in 1986. In the league, he was unmatched, often scoring 17 or 18 points per match. He received support only from A. Huszcza, which is why the Zielona Góra team did not defend their championship title and finished the season in 4th place. In individual competitions, he advanced to the Continental Final of the 1986 Individual Speedway World Championship and won the title of Individual Speedway Polish Championship with a full score on his home track in Zielona Góra.

In the fall of 1986, Jaworek traveled to Germany. The trip, widely perceived as a big surprise, had been planned a year earlier. Despite several letters to the club management requesting an extension of his leave, he did not return in the spring of 1987 for the season opener. Jaworek felt that his sporting opportunities in Poland had come to an end and wanted to compete on Western equipment and face international competition. His departure was perceived in Poland as a betrayal, and his starts in the Speedway Bundesliga were initially blocked.

Only after two years was the penalty lifted, allowing Jaworek to compete in the German speedway league. In 1989, he competed for IG Neuenknick, finishing in 4th place, and in 1990, for MC Norden, finishing in 5th place, achieving an average of 2.833.

In 1990, discussions about his return to the Polish league resurfaced. Jaworek returned to the Zielona Góra track in March 1992. He immediately became one of the leaders of the then Team Speedway Polish Championship. With his participation, the Morawski team won the title of Team Cup of Poland. He also advanced to the final of the Individual Speedway Polish Championship in Zielona Góra. However, the Zielona Góra club did not defend the title of Team Speedway Polish Championship.

The 1993 season began tragically for Morawski and Jaworek. In a match against Unia Leszno, a mid-race collision took the life of young racer Andrzej Zarzecki. Jaworek was seriously injured, suffering a spinal fracture without nerve damage. He returned to the track in the last match of the season against Stal Gorzów Wielkopolski, but ended his career shortly after.

== Personal life ==
Jaworek is married to Marzena, and they have two children: Caroline and Timo.

=== Team Competitions ===
MDMP:

- III place 1979
- Champion 1980

DMP:

- III place 1979
- Champion 1981
- Champion 1982
- IV place 1983
- III place 1984
- Champion 1985
- IV place 1986
- IV place 1992

Polish Cup:

- Champion 1992

=== Pairs Competitions ===
MPPK:

- III place 1986

=== Individual Competitions ===
Silver Helmet:

- III place 1981
- I place 1980 and 1982

MIMP:

- Second runner-up 1981
- Champion 1982

IMP:

- III place 1985
- Champion 1986

== Bibliography ==
- B.A. Łusiak, Macieja Jaworka bonus, zwycięstwo, wykluczenie i upadek, ZKZ SSA ZG, Wydanie 1, Zielona Góra 2011; ISBN 978-83-925001-9-3
- Świat Żużla (Tygodnik Żużlowy), nr 3(51), rok 2002: Gwiazdozbiór polskiego żużla, J... jak Jaworek
