= Bolesław Proch =

Polish speedway rider

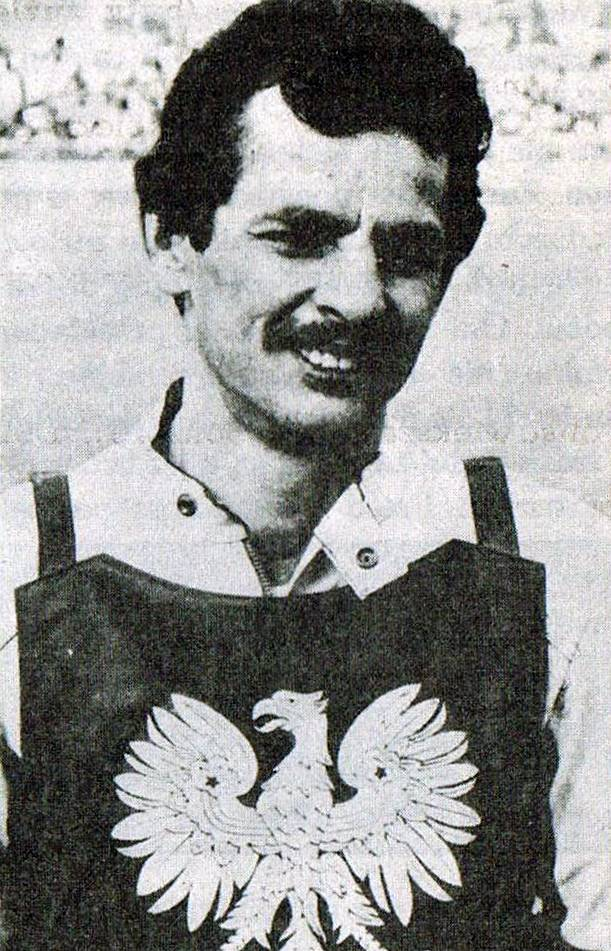
- Born: 4 February 1952; Świebodzin, Poland
- Died: 22 December 2012 (aged 60)
- Nationality: Polish

Career history

Poland
- 1973–1975: Falubaz Zielona Góra
- 1977–1980: Stal Gorzów Wielkopolski
- 1981–1987: Polonia Bydgoszcz

Great Britain
- 1976–1977: Reading Racers
- 1977: Leicester Lions

Individual honours
- 1975: Polish Junior Champion
- 1981: Poland Golden Helmet
- 1975: Poland Silver Helmet

Team honours
- 1977, 1978: Polish League Champion

Bolesław Proch (4 February 1952 – 22 December 2012) was a Polish international motorcycle speedway rider. He earned 15 international caps for the Poland national speedway team.

== Early life and career ==
Born in Świebodzin, Proch first rode for Falubaz in his home town of Zielona Góra in 1973, winning the Polish Junior Championship the following year and finishing fourth in the Silver Helmet tournament. In 1976 he rode in the British League for Reading Racers, averaging over five points per match. In 1977, in mid-season, Reading were ordered to weaken their team as it was found to be exceeding the points limit set by the BSPA which resulted in Proch moving to Leicester Lions in a deal that saw Doug Underwood moving to Reading.

Proch returned to Poland where he rode for Stal Gorzów Wielkopolski (1977–1980) and Polonia Bydgoszcz (1981–1987).

== World Final appearances ==
=== World Team Cup ===
- 1976 – (England) London, White City Stadium (with Edward Jancarz / Zenon Plech / Marek Cieślak / Jerzy Rembas) – 2nd – 28pts (1)
- 1984 – (Poland) Leszno (with Roman Jankowski / Zenon Kasprzak / Leonard Raba / Zenon Plech) – 4th – 8pt (0)

=== World Pairs Championship ===
- 1978 – (Poland) Chorzów, Silesian Stadium (with Edward Jancarz) – 5th – 15pts (2)
