= Bernard Jąder =

Polish speedway rider

- Born: 29 May 1951 (age 75); Leszno, Poland
- Nationality: Polish

Career history
- 1968–1983: Unia Leszno
- 1984–1988: Unia Tarnów

Individual honours
- 1978, 1980: Polish Champion
- 1972: Polish Junior Champion

Team honours
- 1979, 1980: Polish League Champion

Bernard Jąder (born 29 May 1951) is a former international speedway rider from Poland.

== Speedway career ==
Jąder was the champion of Poland on two occasions, winning the Polish Individual Speedway Championship in 1978 and 1980.

Although Jąder did not ride in Britain, he toured the United Kingdom during Poland's 1973 tour when the Poles created significant interest over their fearless riding styles.
