= Andrzej Huszcza =

Polish speedway rider

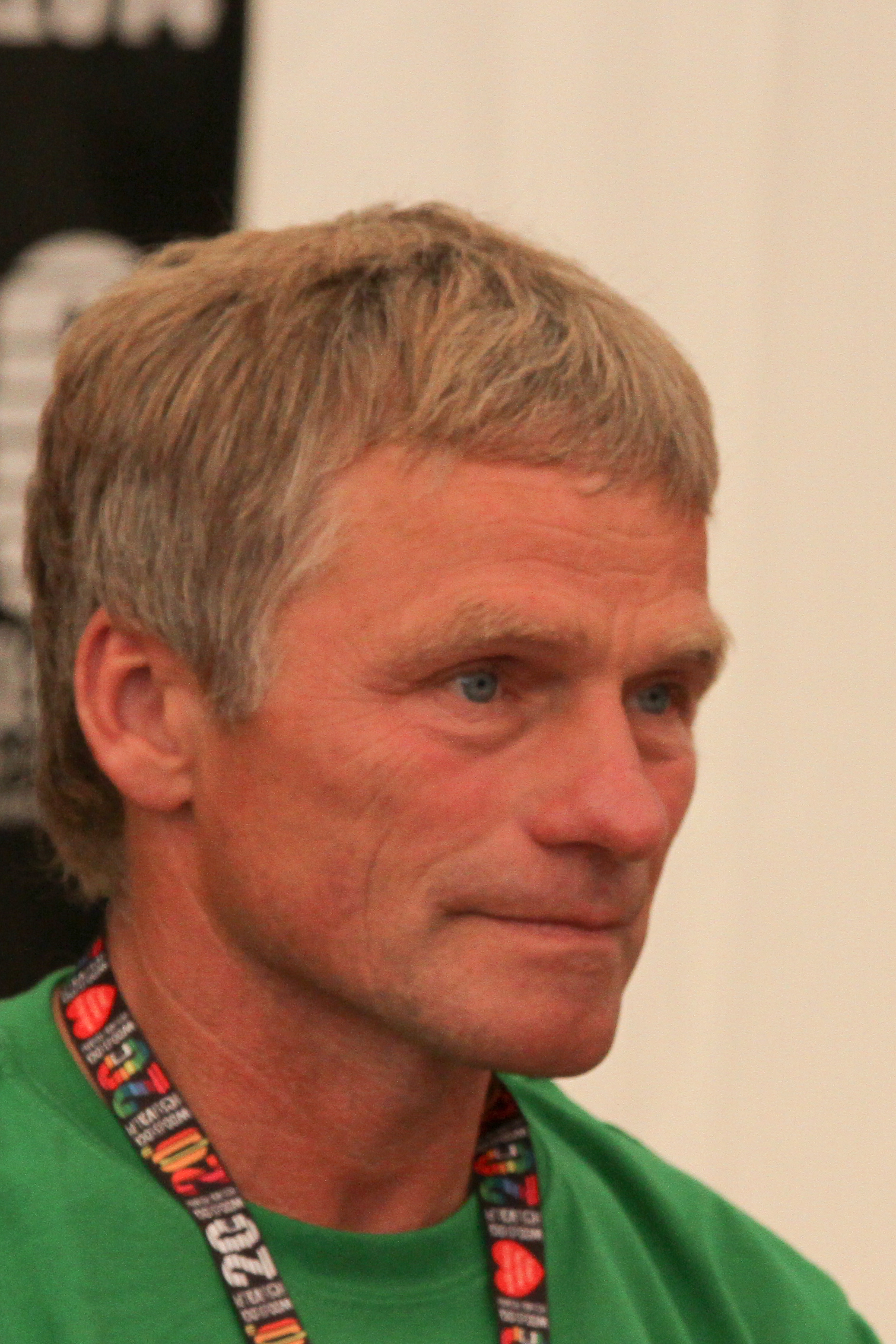
- Born: 10 March 1957 (age 69); Krępa, Poland
- Nationality: Polish

Career history

Poland
- 1975-2005: Zielona Góra
- 2006-2007: PSŻ Poznań

Great Britain
- 1980, 1981: Leicester Lions
- 1981: Hackney Hawks
- 1981: Reading Racers

Individual honours
- 1982: Polish Champion
- 1978: Poland Silver Helmet Winner

Team honours
- 1979, 1982, 1983: Polish Pairs Champion
- 1981, 1982, 1985, 1991: Team Polish Champion

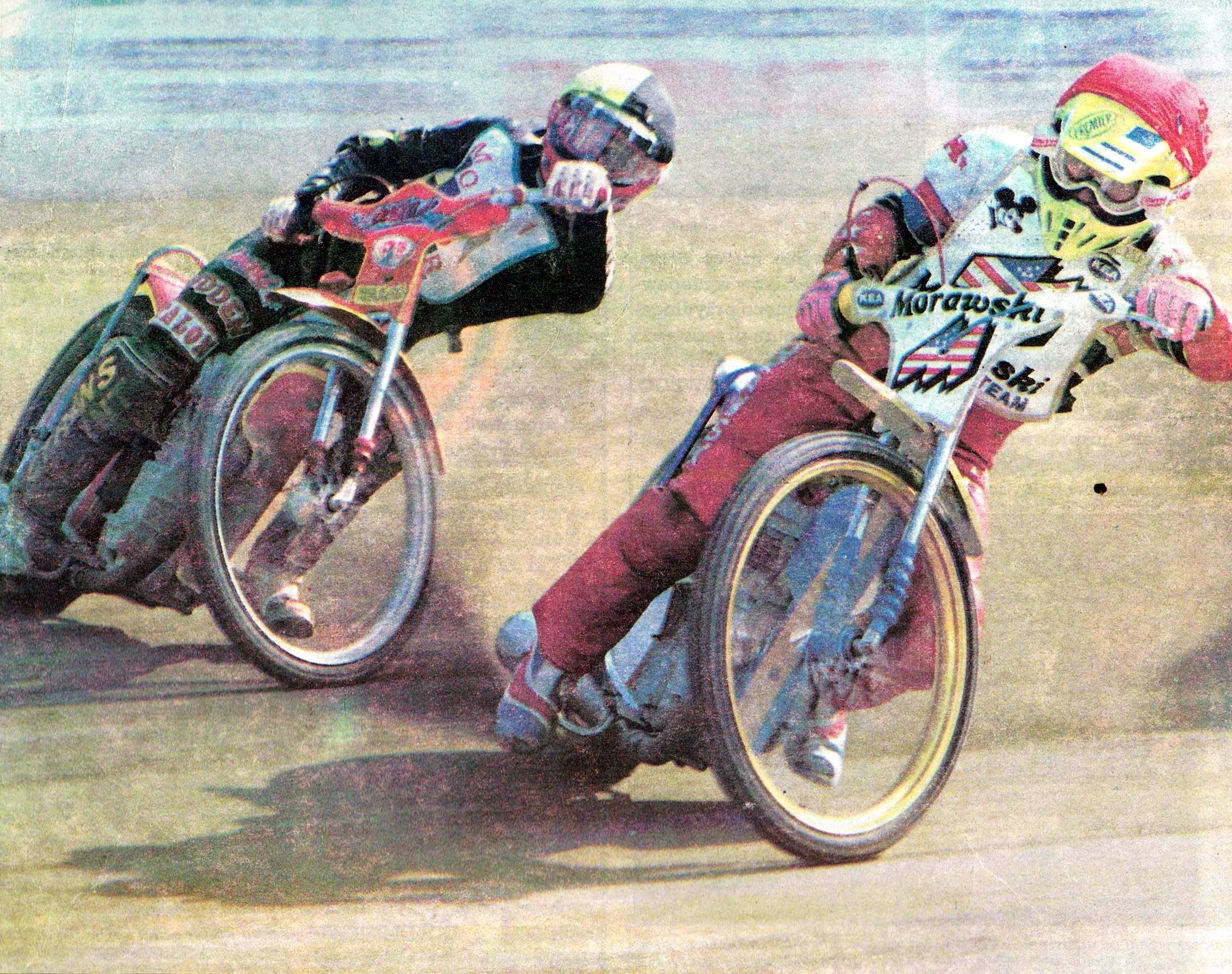
Leigh Adams and Andrzej Huszcza.

Andrzej Huszcza [ˈandrzɛj ˈxuszt͡sza] (born 10 March 1957 in Krępa, Poland) is a Polish former international motorcycle speedway rider. He earned 45 international caps for the Poland speedway team.

== Career ==
Huszcza rode for Falubaz Zielona Góra for thirty years from 1975 until 2005. He then spent two seasons with PSŻ Poznań before finally retiring aged fifty. Huszcza spent two seasons in the UK riding for Leicester Lions in the British League in addition to the Hackney Hawks and Reading Racers.

Huszcza was a reserve (but did not ride) in the 1988 World Final in Vojens, Denmark.

In 2008, Huszcza returned to ZKŻ Zielona Góra as coach.

== Personal life ==
Huszcza is the father of three daughters.

== World Final Appearances ==
=== Individual World Championship ===
- 1988 - (Denmark) Vojens, Speedway Center - Reserve - did not ride.

=== World Pairs Championship ===
- 1985 - (Poland) Rybnik, Rybnik Municipal Stadium (with Grzegorz Dzikowski) - 7th - 8pts (4)

=== World Team Cup ===
- 1978 - (West Germany) Landshut, Ellermühle Stadium (with Edward Jancarz / Zenon Plech / Marek Cieślak / Jerzy Rembas) - 3rd - 16+3pts (1)
- 1980 - (Poland) Wrocław, Olympic Stadium (with Zenon Plech / Roman Jankowski / Edward Jancarz / Jerzy Rembas) - 3rd - 15pt (2)

== European Championship ==
- 2003 - (Czech Republic) Slaný - 9th - 8pts
- 2004 - (Denmark) Holsted - 12th - 5pts

== World (European) Under-21 Championship ==
- 1977 - DEN Vojens, Speedway Center - 10th - 3pts

== Polish Championship ==
- 1982 - (Poland) Zielona Góra - Winner
