= Piotr Pyszny =

Polish speedway rider

- Born: 18 August 1953 (age 73); Jejkowice, Poland
- Nationality: Polish

Career history

Poland
- 1971–1987: Rybnik

Great Britain
- 1979: Poole Pirates
- 1980–1981: Halifax Dukes
- 1983: Eastbourne Eagles

Individual honours
- 1973: Silver Helmet bronze

Team honours
- 1972: Polish League Champion
- 1980: Northern Trophy

Piotr Pyszny (born 18 August 1953) is a former motorcycle speedway rider from Poland. He earned 20 international caps for the Poland national speedway team.

== Career ==
Pyszny came to prominence when he won the bronze medal in the Silver Helmet during the 1973 Polish speedway season. He spent his entire Polish career riding for Rybnik.

Pyszny represented the Poland national speedway team during the final of the 1979 Speedway World Team Cup. He continued to participate in other World Cups and went on to ride for Poland a total of 20 times.

Pyszny made his British leagues debut in the 1979 British League season, riding briefly for Poole Pirates and then rode for Halifax Dukes for two full seasons in 1980 and 1981.
