= 2000 Speedway Grand Prix Qualification =

The 2000 Speedway Grand Prix Qualification or GP Challenge was a series of motorcycle speedway meetings used to determine the 12 riders that would qualify for the 2000 Speedway Grand Prix to join the other 10 riders that finished in the leading positions from the 1999 Speedway Grand Prix.

The format changed from the previous year, in that only 2 riders would qualify straight from the Intercontinental and Continental finals and 10 riders would qualify through the GP Challenge.

Billy Hamill won the GP Challenge.

== Format ==
- First Round - 6 riders from Sweden, 5 from Denmark, 3 from Finland, 2 from Norway to Scandinavian Final
- First Round - 32 riders from Continental quarter finals to Continental semi-finals
- First Round - 8 riders from British Final to Overseas Final
- First Round - 4 riders from Australian Final to Overseas Final
- First Round - 4 riders from United States Final to Overseas Final
- Second Round - 8 riders from Scandinavian Final to Intercontinental Final
- Second Round - 8 riders from Overseas Final to Intercontinental Final
- Second Round - 16 riders from Continental semi-finals to Continental Final
- Third Round - 11 riders from positions 11-21 from the 1999 Grand Prix & World U21 champion to GP Challenge
- Third Round - 1 rider from the Continental Final to 2000 Grand Prix and 5 to GP Challenge
- Third Round - 1 rider from the Intercontinental Final to 2000 Grand Prix and 6 to GP Challenge
- Final Round - 10 riders from the GP Challenge to the 2000 Grand Prix

== First round ==
=== Continental quarter finals ===
QF (18 Apr (Germany) Diedenbergen)
Pos	Rider	Points
1	(Czech Republic) Pavel Ondrašík	13
2	(Hungary) Róbert Nagy	12
3	(Hungary) Attila Stefáni	11
4	(France) Philippe Bergé	11
5	(Czech Republic) Bohumil Brhel	10
6	(Czech Republic) Aleš Dryml Jr.	10
7	(Slovenia) Tomasz Sustersic	10
8	(Russia) Eduard Chajkoulin	9
9	(Russia) Sergej Darkin	8
10	(Germany) Jörg Pingel	5
11	(Germany) Steffen Mell	5
12	(Italy) Simone Tadiello	5
13	(Hungary) Zsolt Bence	3
14	(Italy) Graziano Franchetti	2
15	(Austria) Heinrich Schatzer	1
16	(France) Patrik Goret	1
17	(Czech Republic) Lukáš Dryml	1

QF (2 May (Latvia) Daugavpils)
Pos	Rider	Points
1	(Poland) Robert Flis	14
2	(Poland) Robert Sawina	13
3	(Hungary) Zoltán Adorján	13
4	(Russia) Oleg Kurguskin	12
5	(Czech Republic) Tomáš Topinka	11
6	(Czech Republic) Michal Makovský	10
7	(Latvia) Vladimirs Voronkovs	10
8	(Czech Republic) Richard Wolff	7
9	(Latvia) Nikolajs Kokins	6
10	(Russia) Sergej Eroschin	6
11	(Slovenia) Gerhard Lekse	5
12	(Slovenia) Jozef Koren	5
13	(Latvia) Vitalijs Biznia	3
14	(Latvia) Alexanders Biznia	2
15	(Hungary) Sandor Fekete	2
16	(Latvia) Maksims Andrejevs	0

QF (2 May (Poland) Bydgoszcz)
Pos	Rider	Points
1	(Poland) Sławomir Drabik	15
2	(Poland) Jacek Gollob	13
3	(Poland) Piotr Protasiewicz	12
4	(Poland) Rafał Dobrucki	10
5	(Russia) Roman Povazhny	10
6	(Slovenia) Izak Šantej	9
7	(Germany) Joachim Kugelmann	8
8	(Czech Republic) Antonín Šváb Jr.	8
9	(Czech Republic) Adrian Rymel	7
10	(Slovenia) Martin Peterca	6
11	(Poland) Bart Pijper	5
12	(Poland) Krzysztof Jabłoński	5
13	(Germany) Heiko Müller	3
14	(Netherlands) Erik Eijbergen	2
15	(Netherlands) Otto de Jong	2
16	(Poland) Jacek Rempala	2
17	(Russia) Talgat Galeev	1
18	(Netherlands) Eddy Turksema	0

QF (2 May (Italy) Terenzano)
Pos	Rider	Points
1	(Poland) Piotr Świst	15
2	(Italy) Armando Castagna	14
3	(Poland) Sebastian Ułamek	13
4	(Italy) Andrea Maida	11
5	(Hungary) Sándor Tihanyi	10
6	(France) Sebastien Trésarrieu	10
7	(Italy) Simone Terenzani	8
8	(Czech Republic) Zdenek Schneiderwind	8
9	(Croatia) Zlatko Krznaric	7
10	(Czech Republic) George Štancl	6
11	(France) Stéphane Trésarrieu	5
12	(Croatia) Zeliko Feher	3
13	(Austria) Thomas Stadler	3
14	(Austria) Toni Pilotto	3
15	(Austria) Sigfried Eder	2
16	(Croatia) Renato Kuster	2
17	(Italy) Nicola Andrioli	0

== Second round ==
=== Overseas Final ===
8 riders to Intercontinental Final

=== Scandinavian Final ===
8 riders to Intercontinental Final

(13 June 1999 (Denmark) Holsted)
Pos	Rider	Points
1	(Norway) Rune Holta	14
2	(Denmark) Jesper B Jensen	11
3	(Denmark) Gert Handberg	11
4	(Sweden) Andreas Jonsson	10
5	(Denmark) Charlie Gjedde	9
6	(Sweden) Peter Nahlin	9
7	(Denmark) Ronni Pedersen	9
8	(Finland) Kai Laukkanen	9
9	(Sweden) Niklas Klingberg	8
10	(Finland) Vesa Ylinen	7
11	(Denmark) Bo Skov Eriksen	7
12	(Sweden) Per Wester	6
13	(Sweden) Niklas Karlsson	6
14	(Sweden) Stefan Andersson	2
15	(Norway) Kjell Öyvind Sola	1
16	(Finland) Tomi Reima	1

=== Continental semi finals ===
Continental semi-finals - 16 riders from to Continental final

SF

- 13 June 1999 (Germany) Brokstedt

Pos.	Rider	Points
1	(Germany) Robert Barth	13
2	(Poland) Robert Sawina	12
3	(Czech Republic) Tomáš Topinka	11
4	(Hungary) Róbert Nagy	10
5	(France) Philippe Bergé	10
6	(Hungary) Attila Stefáni	9
7	(Czech Republic) Michal Makovský	9
8	(Czech Republic) Bohumil Brhel	8
9	(Czech Republic) Richard Wolff	8
10	(Czech Republic) Aleš Dryml Jr.	7
11	(Russia) Oleg Kurguskin	7
12	(Czech Republic) Pavel Ondrašík	6
13	(Poland) Robert Flis	6
14	(Germany) Matthias Kröger	3
15	(Hungary) Zoltán Adorján	1
16	(Slovenia) Tomasz Sustersic	0

SF

- 13 June 1999 (Slovenia) Ljubljana

Pos.	Rider	Points
1	(Poland) Sebastian Ułamek	13
2	(Italy) Armando Castagna	13
3	(Poland) Rafał Dobrucki	12
4	(Russia) Roman Povazhny	10
5	(Poland) Jacek Gollob	10
6	(Hungary) Sándor Tihanyi	10
7	(Czech Republic) Antonín Šváb Jr.	9
8	(Poland) Piotr Protasiewicz	9
9	(Germany) Sławomir Drabik	9
10	(Slovenia) Matej Ferjan	5
11	(Italy) Andrea Maida	4
12	(Slovenia) Izak Šantej	4
13	(Italy) Stefano Alfonso	4
14	(France) Sebastien Trésarrieu	3
15	(Italy) Simone Terenzani	3
16	(Poland) Piotr Świst	2

== Third round ==
- 11 riders from positions 11-21 from the 1999 Speedway Grand Prix & World U21 champion to GP Challenge

=== Intercontinental Final ===
1 rider direct to Grand Prix, 6 riders to GP Challenge

=== Continental Final ===
- 1 rider direct to Grand Prix, 5 riders to GP Challenge
- 25 July 1999 (Poland) Wrocław

Pos.	Rider	Points
1	(Poland) Rafał Dobrucki	15
2	(Poland) Piotr Protasiewicz	14
3	(Poland) Sławomir Drabik	11
4	(Poland) Robert Sawina	11
5	(Czech Republic) Bohumil Brhel	10
6	(Poland) Jacek Gollob	8
7	(Russia) Roman Povazhny	8
8	(Poland) Sebastian Ułamek	7
9	(Germany) Robert Barth	7
10	(Czech Republic) Antonín Šváb Jr.	7
11	(Czech Republic) Tomáš Topinka	6
12	(Italy) Armando Castagna	5
13	(Hungary) Sándor Tihanyi	5
14	(Hungary) Attila Stefáni	3
15	(Czech Republic) Richard Wolff	2
16	(Czech Republic) Michal Makovský	1

== Final Round ==
=== GP Challenge ===
10 riders to 2000 Grand Prix

- 17 October 1999 (Italy) Lonigo

Pos.	Rider	pre-qual	qual	sf	Final
1	(United States) Billy Hamill	x	3, 2	3	3
2	(Sweden) Mikael Karlsson	x	3, 3	2	2
3	(England) Carl Stonehewer	2, 2	1, 2, 3	3	1
4	(Denmark) Brian Karger	x	3, 2	2	0
5	(Sweden) Henrik Gustafsson	x	2, 3	1	x
6	(England) Mark Loram	3, 1	2, 1, 3	1	x
7	(England) Andy Smith	x	2, 0, 2	0	x
8	(Czech Republic) Antonín Kasper Jr.	x	2, 2	0	x
9	(Sweden) Peter Karlsson	x	3, 1, 1	x	x
10	(Denmark) Brian Andersen	3, 3	0, 2, 1	x	x
11	(Denmark) John Jørgensen	x	2, 0, 0	x	x
12	(Sweden) Niklas Klingberg	1, 3	2, 1, 0	x	x
13	(Poland) Jacek Gollob	3, 0	3, 0, 1	x	x
14	(Australia) Jason Lyons	3, 3	1, 1	x	x
15	(Poland) Robert Dados	2, 2	0, 0	x	x
16	(England) Gary Havelock	2, 0	3, 0	x	x
17	(Czech Republic) Marián Jirout	2, 1	1	x	x
18	(England) Lee Richardson	0, 2	1	x	x
19	(Poland) Robert Sawina	1, 3	0	x	x
20	(Czech Republic) Bohumil Brhel	1, 2	0	x	x
21	(Poland) Sławomir Drabik	0, 1	x	x	x
22	(Norway) Rune Holta	1, 0	x	x	x
23	(Poland) Piotr Protasiewicz	0, 0	x	x	x
24	(Finland) Kai Laukkanen	0, 1	x	x	x
