= 1999 Speedway Grand Prix of Denmark =

Speedway Grand Prix event in 1999

Information
- Date: 25 September 1999
- City: (Denmark) Vojens
- Event: 6 of 6 (30)
- Referee: (Germany) Wolfgang Glas

Stadium details
- Stadium: Speedway Center
- Track: speedway track

SGP Results
- Best Time
- (gold) Winner: (Sweden) Tony Rickardsson
- (silver) Runner-up: (United Kingdom) Mark Loram
- (bronze) 3rd place: (Denmark) Hans Nielsen

The 1999 Speedway Grand Prix of Denmark was the sixth and last race of the 1999 Speedway Grand Prix season. It took place on 25 September in the Speedway Center in Vojens, Denmark

== Starting positions draw ==
The Speedway Grand Prix Commission nominated British rider Mark Loram and a Jesper B. Jensen as Wild Card.

== Heat details ==
Placing	Draw	Rider	Total	Pre-Main Event										Main Event										Final Event
Placing	Draw	Rider	Total	Round 1						Round 2				Round 1						Round 2				1/2		CF	F
Placing	Draw	Rider	Total	1	2	3	4	5	6	7	8	9	10	11	12	13	14	15	16	17	18	19	20	21	22	23	24
1	2	(Sweden) (1) Tony Rickardsson	25												2					2					1		1
2	23	(United Kingdom) (23) Mark Loram	20		2					1				3				1				2			2		2
3	1	(Denmark) (4) Hans Nielsen	18											2							4	1		1			3
4	8	(United Kingdom) (19) Joe Screen	16											1						1				2			4
5	12	(United States) (22) Billy Hamill	15				1				1				1						1				4X	1
6	5	(Australia) (13) Leigh Adams	14														1				2			4T		2
7	11	(Sweden) (18) Mikael Karlsson	12			1				2					3				1				1		3	3
8	17	(Denmark) (9) Brian Karger	10	3				1				1				3		2					2	3		4
9	4	(Poland) (3) Tomasz Gollob	8														2			4R			3
10	13	(Sweden) (10) Peter Karlsson	8				3		2			2					3		2			3
11	3	(Australia) (7) Ryan Sullivan	7													2					3		4X
12	6	(Sweden) (15) Henrik Gustafsson	7													1				3		4
13	10	(United States) (6) Greg Hancock	6		1						2			4					3
14	7	(Australia) (8) Jason Crump	6												4			3
15	15	(Sweden) (2) Jimmy Nilsen	5		3				1				2			4			4
16	20	(Poland) (21) Robert Dados	5				4	2					1				4X	4
Placing	Draw	Rider	Total	1	2	3	4	5	6	7	8	9	10	11	12	13	14	15	16	17	18	19	20	21	22	23	24
17	9	(United Kingdom) (5) Chris Louis	4	1						4R			3
18	21	(Denmark) (20) John Jørgensen	4				2			3		3
19	22	(Czech Republic) (12) Marian Jirout	3			2					4	4
20	24	(Denmark) (24) Jesper B. Jensen	3	2							3		4F
21	19	(Czech Republic) (11) Antonín Kasper Jr.	2			3		3
22	14	(Sweden) (17) Stefan Dannö	2			4			3
23	18	(Denmark) (14) Brian Andersen	1		4N			4N
24	16	(United Kingdom) (16) Andy Smith	1	4					4

Heats 1-10: Pre-Main Event 1-4: First round 5-6: Last chance for second round 7-8: Second round 9-10: Last chance Main Event	Heats 11-20: Main Event 11-14: First round 15-16: Last chance for second round 17-18: Second round 19-20: Last chance for Semi-Finals	Heats 21-24: Final Event 21-22: Semi-Finals 23: Consolation Final 24: The Big Final

gate A – inside	gate B	gate C	gate D – outside

== The intermediate classification ==
Qualifies for next season's Grand Prix series
Full-time Grand Prix rider
Wild card, track reserve or qualified reserve

Pos.	Rider	Points	CZE (Czech Republic)	SWE (Sweden)	POL (Poland)	GBR (United Kingdom)	PL2 (Poland)	DEN (Denmark)
Gold	(Sweden) (1) Tony Rickardsson	111	7	18	16	25	20	25
Silver	(Poland) (3) Tomasz Gollob	98	25	15	25	10	15	8
Bronze	(Denmark) (4) Hans Nielsen	76	6	1	10	16	25	18
4	(Sweden) (2) Jimmy Nilsen	73	16	20	20	8	4	5
5	(United Kingdom) (23)(25) Mark Loram	71	–	25	2	8	16	20
6	(United Kingdom) (19) Joe Screen	68	12	5	15	12	8	16
7	(Australia) (13) Leigh Adams	67	4	16	5	14	14	14
8	(Australia) (8) Jason Crump	66	18	7	12	15	8	6
9	(United States) (6) Greg Hancock	62	20	7	4	18	7	6
10	(Australia) (7) Ryan Sullivan	55	6	3	14	7	18	7
11	(Sweden) (17) Stefan Dannö	52	10	12	18	5	5	2
12	(United Kingdom) (5) Chris Louis	50	8	6	5	20	7	4
13	(Sweden) (10) Peter Karlsson	45	8	14	6	4	5	8
14	(Sweden) (18) Mikael Karlsson	45	7	5	8	7	6	12
15	(Czech Republic) (11) Antonín Kasper Jr.	39	15	10	7	3	2	2
16	(Denmark) (9) Brian Karger	36	3	8	6	6	3	10
17	(Sweden) (15) Henrik Gustafsson	35	5	2	7	4	10	7
18	(United States) (22) Billy Hamill	35	2	3	3	6	6	15
17	(Denmark) (20) John Jørgensen	32	14	8	3	2	1	4
18	(United Kingdom) (16) Andy Smith	22	5	6	1	5	4	1
19	(Poland) (21) Robert Dados	20	4	4	4	1	2	5
20	(Denmark) (14) Brian Andersen	12	3	1	2	2	3	1
21	(Poland) (23) Jacek Gollob	12	–	–	–	–	12	–
22	(Czech Republic) (12) Marian Jirout	8	1	2	1	1	–	3
25	(Poland) (24) Rafał Dobrucki	8	–	–	8	–	–	–
26	(Poland) (24) Sebastian Ułamek	4	–	4	–	–	–	–
27	(United Kingdom) (24) Scott Nicholls	3	–	–	–	3	–	–
28	(Denmark) (24) Jesper B. Jensen	3	–	–	–	–	–	3
29	(Czech Republic) (23) Antonín Šváb Jr.	2	2	–	–	–	–	–
30	(Poland) (24) Piotr Protasiewicz	2	1	–	–	–	1	–
Pos.	Rider	Points	CZE (Czech Republic)	SWE (Sweden)	POL (Poland)	GBR (United Kingdom)	PL2 (Poland)	DEN (Denmark)

== See also ==
- Speedway Grand Prix
- List of Speedway Grand Prix riders
