= Robert Miśkowiak =

Polish speedway rider

- Born: 21 November 1983 (age 43); Rawicz, Poland
- Nationality: Polish

Career history

Poland
- 2000–2003: Piła
- 2004–2005: Wrocław
- 2006–2007: Leszno
- 2008–2009: Ostrów
- 2010–2011, 2019: Poznań
- 2012, 2014: Lublin
- 2013: Gdańsk
- 2015: Bydgoszcz
- 2015–2018: Łódź

Great Britain
- 2005–2010: Ipswich Witches
- 2012–2013: Wolverhampton Wolves
- 2013: Poole Pirates

Sweden
- 2003: Lejonen
- 2005: Kaparna
- 2006: Västervik
- 2007–2008: Smederna

Denmark
- 2007: Esbjerg
- 2016: Munkebo

Individual honours
- 2004: World Under-21 Champion

Team honours
- 2007: Team Polish Champion

Robert Miśkowiak (born 21 November 1983 in Rawicz, Poland) is a former motorcycle speedway rider form Poland.

== Career ==
In 2003, Miśkowiak reached the final of the Speedway Under-21 World Championship. The following year, he became the World Under-21 Champion, after winning the 2004 Speedway Under-21 World Championship.

In Britain, Miśkowiak raced for Ipswich Witches from 2005 until 2010. In 2012, he joined Wolverhampton Wolves, where he rode for two seasons.

== Speedway Grand Prix results ==
2005 Speedway Grand Prix Final Championship standings (Riding No 16)
Race no.	Grand Prix	Pos.	Pts.	Heats	Draw No
1 /9	(Europe) European SGP	injury → (16) Krzysztof Kasprzak			7

permanent speedway rider
wild card, track reserve or qualified reserve
rider not classified (track reserve who did not start)

== Honours ==
- Individual U-21 World Championship
  - 2003 - 12th place (6 points)
  - 2004 - World Champion (12 points +2 +3)
- Individual U-19 European Championship
  - 2002 - 8th place (7 points)
- European Club Champions' Cup:
  - 2007 - Winner in Semi-Final 1 (18 points)
- Polish Pairs U-21 Championship
  - 2002 - Polish Champion with Piła
  - 2003 - 3rd place with Piła
- Team Polish Championship
  - 2000 - 2nd place with Piła (details)
  - 2004 - 2nd place with Wrocław (details)
  - 2007 - Polish Champion with Leszno (details)
- Team U-21 Polish Championship
- 2001 - 2nd place
- 2003 - Polish Champion
- Silver Helmet (U-21)
- 2003 - Winner
- Bronze Helmet (U-19)
- 2001 - 2nd place

== Family ==
Miśkowiak's nephew is Polish international speedway rider Jakub Miśkowiak.

== See also ==
- Speedway in Poland
- Poland national speedway team
