= 1999 Speedway Grand Prix of Sweden =

Information
- Date: 4 June 1999
- City: (Sweden) Linköping
- Event: 2 of 6 (26)
- Referee: (Germany) Wolfgang Glas

Stadium details
- Stadium: Motorstadium
- Track: speedway track

SGP Results
- Best Time
- (gold) Winner: (United Kingdom) Mark Loram
- (silver) Runner-up: (Sweden) Jimmy Nilsen
- (bronze) 3rd place: (Sweden) Tony Rickardsson

The 1999 Speedway Grand Prix of Sweden was the second race of the 1999 Speedway Grand Prix season. It took place on 4 June in the Motorstadium in Linköping, Sweden It was the fifth Swedish SGP and was won by wild card rider Mark Loram.

== Starting positions draw ==
The Speedway Grand Prix Commission nominated British rider Mark Loram and a Pole Sebastian Ułamek as Wild Card.

== Heat details ==
Placing	Draw	Rider	Total	Pre-Main Event										Main Event										Final Event
Placing	Draw	Rider	Total	Round 1						Round 2				Round 1						Round 2				1/2		CF	F
Placing	Draw	Rider	Total	1	2	3	4	5	6	7	8	9	10	11	12	13	14	15	16	17	18	19	20	21	22	23	24
1	23	(United Kingdom) (23) Mark Loram	25		1						3		2			3		2					1		2		1
2	4	(Sweden) (2) Jimmy Nilsen	20														2			1				1			2
3	11	(Sweden) (1) Tony Rickardsson	18			3		1				1				2					1				1		3
4	17	(Australia) (13) Leigh Adams	16	3				2					1				4	1				1		2			4
5	1	(Poland) (3) Tomasz Gollob	15											1						2					3	1
6	10	(Sweden) (10) Peter Karlsson	14		2					2					1						3		2	3		2
7	8	(Sweden) (17) Stefan Dannö	12											2							2			4		3
8	5	(Czech Republic) (11) Antonín Kasper Jr.	10														1				4	2			4	4
9	19	(Denmark) (9) Brian Karger	8			2					1				3				1				3
10	6	(Denmark) (20) John Jørgensen	8													4			2			3X
11	2	(United States) (6) Greg Hancock	7												2					3		4M
12	3	(Australia) (8) Jason Crump	7													1				4F			4R
13	9	(United Kingdom) (5) Chris Louis	6	1						1				3				3
14	16	(United Kingdom) (16) Andy Smith	6	2							4	2					3		3
15	12	(Sweden) (18) Mikael Karlsson	5				1				2			4R					4
16	7	(United Kingdom) (19) Joe Screen	5												4R			4
Placing	Draw	Rider	Total	1	2	3	4	5	6	7	8	9	10	11	12	13	14	15	16	17	18	19	20	21	22	23	24
17	18	(Poland) (21) Robert Dados	4		3				2			3
18	24	(Poland) (24) Sebastian Ułamek	4	4					1				3
19	14	(Australia) (7) Ryan Sullivan	3			1				3		4R
20	21	(United States) (22) Billy Hamill	3				2			4			4
21	22	(Czech Republic) (12) Marian Jirout	2			4			3
22	15	(Sweden) (15) Henrik Gustafsson	2		4			3
23	13	(Denmark) (4) Hans Nielsen	1				3		4X
24	20	(Denmark) (14) Brian Andersen	1				4	4

Heats 1-10: Pre-Main Event 1-4: First round 5-6: Last chance for second round 7-8: Second round 9-10: Last chance Main Event	Heats 11-20: Main Event 11-14: First round 15-16: Last chance for second round 17-18: Second round 19-20: Last chance for Semi-Finals	Heats 21-24: Final Event 21-22: Semi-Finals 23: Consolation Final 24: The Big Final

gate A – inside	gate B	gate C	gate D – outside

== The intermediate classification ==
Qualifies for next season's Grand Prix series
Full-time Grand Prix rider
Wild card, track reserve or qualified reserve

Pos.	Rider	Points	CZE (Czech Republic)	SWE (Sweden)	POL (Poland)	GBR (United Kingdom)	PL2 (Poland)	DEN (Denmark)
1	(Poland) (3) Tomasz Gollob	40	25	15				
2	(Sweden) (2) Jimmy Nilsen	36	16	20				
3	(United States) (6) Greg Hancock	27	20	7				
4	(Sweden) (1) Tony Rickardsson	25	7	18				
5	(Australia) (8) Jason Crump	25	18	7				
6	(Czech Republic) (11) Antonín Kasper Jr.	25	15	10				
7	(United Kingdom) (23) Mark Loram	25	–	25				
8	(Sweden) (10) Peter Karlsson	22	8	14				
9	(Sweden) (17) Stefan Dannö	22	10	12				
10	(Denmark) (20) John Jørgensen	22	14	8				
11	(Australia) (13) Leigh Adams	20	4	16				
12	(United Kingdom) (19) Joe Screen	17	12	5				
13	(United Kingdom) (5) Chris Louis	14	8	6				
14	(Sweden) (18) Mikael Karlsson	12	7	5				
15	(Denmark) (9) Brian Karger	11	3	8				
16	(United Kingdom) (16) Andy Smith	11	5	6				
17	(Australia) (7) Ryan Sullivan	9	6	3				
18	(Poland) (21) Robert Dados	8	4	4				
19	(Denmark) (4) Hans Nielsen	7	6	1				
20	(Sweden) (15) Henrik Gustafsson	7	5	2				
21	(United States) (22) Billy Hamill	5	2	3				
22	(Denmark) (14) Brian Andersen	4	3	1				
23	(Poland) (24) Sebastian Ułamek	4	–	4				
24	(Czech Republic) (12) Marian Jirout	3	1	2				
25	(Czech Republic) (23) Antonín Šváb Jr.	2	2	–				
26	(Poland) (24) Piotr Protasiewicz	1	1	–				
Pos.	Rider	Points	CZE (Czech Republic)	SWE (Sweden)	POL (Poland)	GBR (United Kingdom)	PL2 (Poland)	DEN (Denmark)

== See also ==
- Speedway Grand Prix
- List of Speedway Grand Prix riders
