= 1999 Speedway Grand Prix of Poland =

Information
- Date: 3 July 1999
- City: (Poland) Wrocław
- Event: 3 of 6 (27)
- Referee: (United Kingdom) Anthony Steele

Stadium details
- Stadium: Olympic Stadium
- Track: speedway track

SGP Results
- Best Time
- (gold) Winner: (Poland) Tomasz Gollob
- (silver) Runner-up: (Sweden) Jimmy Nilsen
- (bronze) 3rd place: (Sweden) Stefan Dannö

The 1999 Speedway Grand Prix of Poland was the third race of the 1999 Speedway Grand Prix season. It took place on 3 July at the Olympic Stadium in Linköping, Sweden

== Starting positions draw ==
The Speedway Grand Prix Commission nominated British rider Mark Loram and a Pole Sebastian Ułamek as Wild Card.

== Heat details ==
| Placing | Draw | Rider | Total | Pre-Main Event | | | | | | | | | | Main Event | | | | | | | | | | Final Event |
| Placing | Draw | Rider | Total | Round 1 | | | | | | Round 2 | | | | Round 1 | | | | | | Round 2 | | | | 1/2 | | CF | F |
| Placing | Draw | Rider | Total | 1 | 2 | 3 | 4 | 5 | 6 | 7 | 8 | 9 | 10 | 11 | 12 | 13 | 14 | 15 | 16 | 17 | 18 | 19 | 20 | 21 | 22 | 23 | 24 |
|---|---|---|---|---|---|---|---|---|---|---|---|---|---|---|---|---|---|---|---|---|---|---|---|---|---|---|---|
| 1 | 4 | (Poland) (3) Tomasz Gollob | 25 | | | | | | | | | | | | | | 1 | | | | 2 | | | 1 | | | 1 |
| 2 | 1 | (Sweden) (2) Jimmy Nilsen | 20 | | | | | | | | | | | 3 | | | | 1 | | | | 2 | | | 2 | | 2 |
| 3 | 6 | (Sweden) (17) Stefan Dannö | 18 | | | | | | | | | | | | | 4 | | | 2 | | | 1 | | 2 | | | 3 |
| 4 | 2 | (Sweden) (1) Tony Rickardsson | 16 | | | | | | | | | | | | 2 | | | | | 4 | | | 1 | | 1 | | 4 |
| 5 | 15 | (United Kingdom) (19) Joe Screen | 15 | | 2 | | | | | 2 | | | | | 1 | | | | | | 3 | | 2 | 4 | | 1 |
| 6 | 17 | (Australia) (7) Ryan Sullivan | 14 | 4T | | | | | 1 | | | | 2 | | | 2 | | | | | 1 | | | | 4X | 2 |
| 7 | 11 | (Australia) (8) Jason Crump | 12 | | | 1 | | | | 3 | | 2 | | | | | 2 | | | 1 | | | | 3 | | 3 |
| 8 | 21 | (Denmark) (4) Hans Nielsen | 10 | | | | 2 | | | 1 | | | | 1 | | | | | | 2 | | | | | 3 | 4 |
| 9 | 14 | (Sweden) (18) Mikael Karlsson | 8 | | | 2 | | | | | 2 | | | 2 | | | | | | | 4 | 3 |
| 10 | 24 | (Poland) (24) Rafał Dobrucki | 8 | 1 | | | | | | 4 | | | 1 | | | | 3 | | 1 | | | | 3 |
| 11 | 7 | (Czech Republic) (11) Antonín Kasper Jr. | 7 | | | | | | | | | | | | 4 | | | 2 | | | | | 4 |
| 12 | 20 | (Sweden) (15) Henrik Gustafsson | 7 | | | | 4 | 1 | | | | 1 | | | | 1 | | | | 3 | | 4 |
| 13 | 8 | (Denmark) (9) Brian Karger | 6 | | | | | | | | | | | 4 | | | | | 3 |
| 14 | 5 | (Sweden) (10) Peter Karlsson | 6 | | | | | | | | | | | | | | 4 | 3 |
| 15 | 12 | (United Kingdom) (5) Chris Louis | 5 | | | | 1 | | | | 1 | | | | 3 | | | | 4 |
| 16 | 3 | (Australia) (13) Leigh Adams | 5 | | | | | | | | | | | | | 3 | | 4T |
| Placing | Draw | Rider | Total | 1 | 2 | 3 | 4 | 5 | 6 | 7 | 8 | 9 | 10 | 11 | 12 | 13 | 14 | 15 | 16 | 17 | 18 | 19 | 20 | 21 | 22 | 23 | 24 |
| 17 | 10 | (United States) (6) Greg Hancock | 4 | | 1 | | | | | | 3 | | 3 |
| 18 | 16 | (Poland) (21) Robert Dados | 4 | 2 | | | | | | | 4 | 3 |
| 19 | 9 | (Denmark) (20) John Jørgensen | 3 | 3 | | | | 2 | | | | | 4 |
| 20 | 18 | (United States) (22) Billy Hamill | 3 | | 3 | | | | 2 | | | 4 |
| 21 | 22 | (Denmark) (14) Brian Andersen | 2 | | | 4F | | | 3 |
| 22 | 23 | (United Kingdom) (23) Mark Loram | 2 | | 4R | | | 3 |
| 23 | 19 | (Czech Republic) (12) Marian Jirout | 1 | | | 3 | | 4 |
| 24 | 13 | (United Kingdom) (16) Andy Smith | 1 | | | | 3 | | 4T |

| Heats 1-10: Pre-Main Event 1-4: First round 5-6: Last chance for second round 7-8: Second round 9-10: Last chance Main Event | Heats 11-20: Main Event 11-14: First round 15-16: Last chance for second round 17-18: Second round 19-20: Last chance for Semi-Finals | Heats 21-24: Final Event 21-22: Semi-Finals 23: Consolation Final 24: The Big Final |

| gate A – inside | gate B | gate C | gate D – outside |

== The intermediate classification ==
Qualifies for next season's Grand Prix series
Full-time Grand Prix rider
Wild card, track reserve or qualified reserve

| Pos. | Rider | Points | CZE (Czech Republic) | SWE (Sweden) | POL (Poland) | GBR (United Kingdom) | PL2 (Poland) | DEN (Denmark) |
| 1 | (Poland) (3) Tomasz Gollob | 65 | 25 | 15 | 25 | | | |
| 2 | (Sweden) (2) Jimmy Nilsen | 56 | 16 | 20 | 20 | | | |
| 3 | (Sweden) (1) Tony Rickardsson | 41 | 7 | 18 | 16 | | | |
| 4 | (Sweden) (17) Stefan Dannö | 40 | 10 | 12 | 18 | | | |
| 5 | (Australia) (8) Jason Crump | 37 | 18 | 7 | 12 | | | |
| 6 | (Czech Republic) (11) Antonín Kasper Jr. | 32 | 15 | 10 | 7 | | | |
| 7 | (United Kingdom) (19) Joe Screen | 32 | 12 | 5 | 15 | | | |
| 8 | (United States) (6) Greg Hancock | 31 | 20 | 7 | 4 | | | |
| 9 | (Sweden) (10) Peter Karlsson | 28 | 8 | 14 | 6 | | | |
| 10 | (United Kingdom) (23) Mark Loram | 27 | – | 25 | 2 | | | |
| 11 | (Australia) (13) Leigh Adams | 25 | 4 | 16 | 5 | | | |
| 12 | (Denmark) (20) John Jørgensen | 25 | 14 | 8 | 3 | | | |
| 13 | (Australia) (7) Ryan Sullivan | 23 | 6 | 3 | 14 | | | |
| 14 | (Sweden) (18) Mikael Karlsson | 20 | 7 | 5 | 8 | | | |
| 15 | (United Kingdom) (5) Chris Louis | 19 | 8 | 6 | 5 | | | |
| 16 | (Denmark) (4) Hans Nielsen | 17 | 6 | 1 | 10 | | | |
| 17 | (Denmark) (9) Brian Karger | 17 | 3 | 8 | 6 | | | |
| 18 | (Sweden) (15) Henrik Gustafsson | 14 | 5 | 2 | 7 | | | |
| 19 | (United Kingdom) (16) Andy Smith | 12 | 5 | 6 | 1 | | | |
| 20 | (Poland) (21) Robert Dados | 12 | 4 | 4 | 4 | | | |
| 21 | (United States) (22) Billy Hamill | 8 | 2 | 3 | 3 | | | |
| 22 | (Poland) (24) Rafał Dobrucki | 8 | – | – | 8 | | | |
| 23 | (Denmark) (14) Brian Andersen | 6 | 3 | 1 | 2 | | | |
| 24 | (Czech Republic) (12) Marian Jirout | 4 | 1 | 2 | 1 | | | |
| 25 | (Poland) (24) Sebastian Ułamek | 4 | – | 4 | – | | | |
| 26 | (Czech Republic) (23) Antonín Šváb Jr. | 2 | 2 | – | – | | | |
| 27 | (Poland) (24) Piotr Protasiewicz | 1 | 1 | – | – | | | |
| Pos. | Rider | Points | CZE (Czech Republic) | SWE (Sweden) | POL (Poland) | GBR (United Kingdom) | PL2 (Poland) | DEN (Denmark) |

== See also ==
- Speedway Grand Prix
- List of Speedway Grand Prix riders
