= 1999 Speedway Grand Prix of Poland II =

1998 Speedway Grand Prix of Poland

Information
- Date: 28 September 1998
- City: (Poland) Bydgoszcz
- Event: 5 of 6 (29)
- Referee: (United Kingdom) Anthony Steele

Stadium details
- Stadium: Polonia Stadium
- Length: 348 m (381 yd)
- Track: speedway track

SGP Results
- Best Time
- (gold) Winner: (Denmark) Hans Nielsen
- (silver) Runner-up: (Sweden) Tony Rickardsson
- (bronze) 3rd place: (Australia) Ryan Sullivan

The 1998 Speedway Grand Prix of Poland was the fifth race of the 1999 Speedway Grand Prix season. It took place on 28 September in the Polonia Stadium in Bydgoszcz, Poland

== Starting positions draw ==
The Speedway Grand Prix Commission nominated British rider Jacek Gollob and a Piotr Protasiewicz as Wild Card.

Draw 22. (Czech Republic) (12) Marian Jirout → (United Kingdom) (25) Mark Loram

== Heat details ==
Placing	Draw	Rider	Total	Pre-Main Event										Main Event										Final Event
Placing	Draw	Rider	Total	Round 1						Round 2				Round 1						Round 2				1/2		CF	F
Placing	Draw	Rider	Total	1	2	3	4	5	6	7	8	9	10	11	12	13	14	15	16	17	18	19	20	21	22	23	24
1	4	(Denmark) (4) Hans Nielsen	25														1				1				1		1
2	1	(Sweden) (1) Tony Rickardsson	20											1						1				1			2
3	10	(Australia) (7) Ryan Sullivan	18		1						1				1						2			2			3
4	22	(United Kingdom) (25) Mark Loram	16			3		1				1				1				2					2		4R
5	8	(Poland) (3) Tomasz Gollob	15											2							3		1		3	1
6	6	(Australia) (13) Leigh Adams	14													3		1				1		3		2
7	23	(Poland) (23) Jacek Gollob	12		3				1				1				2			4			2	4		3
8	17	(Sweden) (15) Henrik Gustafsson	10	1						2					2					3		2			4	4
9	5	(Australia) (8) Jason Crump	8														3		1				3
10	7	(United Kingdom) (19) Joe Screen	8												3				2			3
11	2	(United Kingdom) (5) Chris Louis	7												4			2					4
12	3	(United States) (6) Greg Hancock	7													2					4	4
13	11	(Sweden) (18) Mikael Karlsson	6			2					4	2					4	3
14	13	(United States) (22) Billy Hamill	6				1				2			4					3
15	16	(Sweden) (10) Peter Karlsson	5	2							3		2			4			4
16	15	(Sweden) (17) Stefan Dannö	5		2					1				3				4G
Placing	Draw	Rider	Total	1	2	3	4	5	6	7	8	9	10	11	12	13	14	15	16	17	18	19	20	21	22	23	24
17	9	(Sweden) (2) Jimmy Nilsen	4	3				2					3
18	14	(United Kingdom) (16) Andy Smith	4			1				3		3
19	12	(Denmark) (9) Brian Karger	3				2			4			4G
20	19	(Denmark) (14) Brian Andersen	3			4			2			4
21	18	(Czech Republic) (11) Antonín Kasper Jr.	2		4			3
22	21	(Poland) (21) Robert Dados	2				3		3
23	20	(Denmark) (20) John Jørgensen	1				4	4
24	24	(Poland) (24) Piotr Protasiewicz	1	4F					4

Heats 1-10: Pre-Main Event 1-4: First round 5-6: Last chance for second round 7-8: Second round 9-10: Last chance Main Event	Heats 11-20: Main Event 11-14: First round 15-16: Last chance for second round 17-18: Second round 19-20: Last chance for Semi-Finals	Heats 21-24: Final Event 21-22: Semi-Finals 23: Consolation Final 24: The Big Final

gate A – inside	gate B	gate C	gate D – outside

== The intermediate classification ==
Qualifies for next season's Grand Prix series
Full-time Grand Prix rider
Wild card, track reserve or qualified reserve

Pos.	Rider	Points	CZE (Czech Republic)	SWE (Sweden)	POL (Poland)	GBR (United Kingdom)	PL2 (Poland)	DEN (Denmark)
1	(Poland) (3) Tomasz Gollob	90	25	15	25	10	15	
2	(Sweden) (1) Tony Rickardsson	86	7	18	16	25	20	
3	(Sweden) (2) Jimmy Nilsen	68	16	20	20	8	4	
4	(Australia) (8) Jason Crump	60	18	7	12	15	8	
5	(Denmark) (4) Hans Nielsen	58	6	1	10	16	25	
6	(United States) (6) Greg Hancock	56	20	7	4	18	7	
7	(Australia) (13) Leigh Adams	53	4	16	5	14	14	
8	(United Kingdom) (19) Joe Screen	52	12	5	15	12	8	
9	(United Kingdom) (23)(25) Mark Loram	51	–	25	2	8	16	
10	(Sweden) (17) Stefan Dannö	50	10	12	18	5	5	
11	(Australia) (7) Ryan Sullivan	48	6	3	14	7	18	
12	(United Kingdom) (5) Chris Louis	46	8	6	5	20	7	
13	(Sweden) (10) Peter Karlsson	37	8	14	6	4	5	
14	(Czech Republic) (11) Antonín Kasper Jr.	37	15	10	7	3	2	
15	(Sweden) (18) Mikael Karlsson	33	7	5	8	7	6	
16	(Sweden) (15) Henrik Gustafsson	28	5	2	7	4	10	
17	(Denmark) (20) John Jørgensen	28	14	8	3	2	1	
18	(Denmark) (9) Brian Karger	26	3	8	6	6	3	
19	(United Kingdom) (16) Andy Smith	21	5	6	1	5	4	
20	(United States) (22) Billy Hamill	20	2	3	3	6	6	
21	(Poland) (21) Robert Dados	15	4	4	4	1	2	
22	(Poland) (23) Jacek Gollob	12	–	–	–	–	12	
23	(Denmark) (14) Brian Andersen	11	3	1	2	2	3	
24	(Poland) (24) Rafał Dobrucki	8	–	–	8	–	–	
25	(Czech Republic) (12) Marian Jirout	5	1	2	1	1	–	
26	(Poland) (24) Sebastian Ułamek	4	–	4	–	–	–	
27	(United Kingdom) (24) Scott Nicholls	3	–	–	–	3	–	
28	(Czech Republic) (23) Antonín Šváb Jr.	2	2	–	–	–	–	
29	(Poland) (24) Piotr Protasiewicz	2	1	–	–	–	1	
Pos.	Rider	Points	CZE (Czech Republic)	SWE (Sweden)	POL (Poland)	GBR (United Kingdom)	PL2 (Poland)	DEN (Denmark)

== See also ==
- Speedway Grand Prix
- List of Speedway Grand Prix riders
