= 1999 Speedway Grand Prix of Great Britain =

(United Kingdom) 1999 Speedway Grand Prix of Great Britain

Information
- Date: 31 July 1999
- City: (United Kingdom) Coventry
- Event: 4 of 6 (28)
- Referee: (Hungary) Istvan Darago

Stadium details
- Stadium: Brandon Stadium
- Capacity: 5,000
- Length: 320 m (350 yd)
- Track: speedway track

SGP Results
- Best Time
- (gold) Winner: (Sweden) Tony Rickardsson
- (silver) Runner-up: (United Kingdom) Chris Louis
- (bronze) 3rd place: (United States) Greg Hancock

The 1999 Speedway Grand Prix of Great Britain was the fourth race of the 1999 Speedway Grand Prix season. It took place on 31 July at the Brandon Stadium in Coventry, England

== Starting positions draw ==
The Speedway Grand Prix Commission nominated British rider Mark Loram and a Scott Nicholls as Wild Card.

== Heat details ==
Placing	Draw	Rider	Total	Pre-Main Event										Main Event										Final Event
Placing	Draw	Rider	Total	Round 1						Round 2				Round 1						Round 2				1/2		CF	F
Placing	Draw	Rider	Total	1	2	3	4	5	6	7	8	9	10	11	12	13	14	15	16	17	18	19	20	21	22	23	24
1	4	(Sweden) (1) Tony Rickardsson	25														1				1				1		1
2	14	(United Kingdom) (5) Chris Louis	20			2					4	2					4	2					1		2		2
3	16	(United States) (6) Greg Hancock	18	1						3		1				1				1				1			3
4	8	(Denmark) (4) Hans Nielsen	16											2							2			2			4
5	7	(Australia) (8) Jason Crump	15												2					2					3	1
6	15	(Australia) (13) Leigh Adams	14		1						1				4			1				2			4	2
7	5	(United Kingdom) (19) Joe Screen	12														2			4			2	3		3
8	1	(Poland) (3) Tomasz Gollob	10											4					2			1		4R		4R
9	2	(Sweden) (2) Jimmy Nilsen	8												1						3		3
10	23	(United Kingdom) (23) Mark Loram	8		2					1				1						3		3
11	6	(Australia) (7) Ryan Sullivan	7													2					4	4
12	9	(Sweden) (18) Mikael Karlsson	7	3				2					1				3		1				4R
13	12	(Denmark) (9) Brian Karger	6				1				2			3				3
14	19	(United States) (22) Billy Hamill	6			4M			1				2			4			3
15	22	(United Kingdom) (16) Andy Smith	5			1				2					3				4
16	3	(Sweden) (17) Stefan Dannö	5													3		4
Placing	Draw	Rider	Total	1	2	3	4	5	6	7	8	9	10	11	12	13	14	15	16	17	18	19	20	21	22	23	24
17	13	(Sweden) (10) Peter Karlsson	4				2			4			3R
18	11	(Sweden) (15) Henrik Gustafsson	4			3		1				3
19	10	(Czech Republic) (11) Antonín Kasper Jr.	3		3				2			4
20	24	(United Kingdom) (24) Scott Nicholls	3	2							3		4T
21	20	(Denmark) (14) Brian Andersen	2				3		3
22	18	(Denmark) (20) John Jørgensen	2		4			3
23	21	(Czech Republic) (12) Marian Jirout	1				4N	4N
24	17	(Poland) (21) Robert Dados	1	4					4M

Heats 1-10: Pre-Main Event 1-4: First round 5-6: Last chance for second round 7-8: Second round 9-10: Last chance Main Event	Heats 11-20: Main Event 11-14: First round 15-16: Last chance for second round 17-18: Second round 19-20: Last chance for Semi-Finals	Heats 21-24: Final Event 21-22: Semi-Finals 23: Consolation Final 24: The Big Final

gate A – inside	gate B	gate C	gate D – outside

== The intermediate classification ==
Qualifies for next season's Grand Prix series
Full-time Grand Prix rider
Wild card, track reserve or qualified reserve

Pos.	Rider	Points	CZE (Czech Republic)	SWE (Sweden)	POL (Poland)	GBR (United Kingdom)	PL2 (Poland)	DEN (Denmark)
1	(Poland) (3) Tomasz Gollob	75	25	15	25	10		
2	(Sweden) (1) Tony Rickardsson	66	7	18	16	25		
3	(Sweden) (2) Jimmy Nilsen	64	16	20	20	8		
4	(Australia) (8) Jason Crump	52	18	7	12	15		
5	(United States) (6) Greg Hancock	49	20	7	4	18		
6	(Sweden) (17) Stefan Dannö	45	10	12	18	5		
7	(United Kingdom) (19) Joe Screen	44	12	5	15	12		
8	(United Kingdom) (5) Chris Louis	39	8	6	5	20		
9	(Australia) (13) Leigh Adams	39	4	16	5	14		
10	(Czech Republic) (11) Antonín Kasper Jr.	35	15	10	7	3		
11	(United Kingdom) (23) Mark Loram	35	–	25	2	8		
12	(Denmark) (4) Hans Nielsen	33	6	1	10	16		
13	(Sweden) (10) Peter Karlsson	32	8	14	6	4		
14	(Australia) (7) Ryan Sullivan	30	6	3	14	7		
15	(Sweden) (18) Mikael Karlsson	27	7	5	8	7		
16	(Denmark) (20) John Jørgensen	27	14	8	3	2		
17	(Denmark) (9) Brian Karger	23	3	8	6	6		
18	(Sweden) (15) Henrik Gustafsson	18	5	2	7	4		
19	(United Kingdom) (16) Andy Smith	17	5	6	1	5		
20	(United States) (22) Billy Hamill	14	2	3	3	6		
21	(Poland) (21) Robert Dados	13	4	4	4	1		
22	(Denmark) (14) Brian Andersen	8	3	1	2	2		
23	(Poland) (24) Rafał Dobrucki	8	–	–	8	–		
24	(Czech Republic) (12) Marian Jirout	5	1	2	1	1		
25	(Poland) (24) Sebastian Ułamek	4	–	4	–	–		
26	(United Kingdom) (24) Scott Nicholls	3	–	–	–	3		
27	(Czech Republic) (23) Antonín Šváb Jr.	2	2	–	–	–		
28	(Poland) (24) Piotr Protasiewicz	1	1	–	–	–		
Pos.	Rider	Points	CZE (Czech Republic)	SWE (Sweden)	POL (Poland)	GBR (United Kingdom)	PL2 (Poland)	DEN (Denmark)

== See also ==
- Speedway Grand Prix
- List of Speedway Grand Prix riders
