= 1997 Polish speedway season =

Motorcycle racing competition

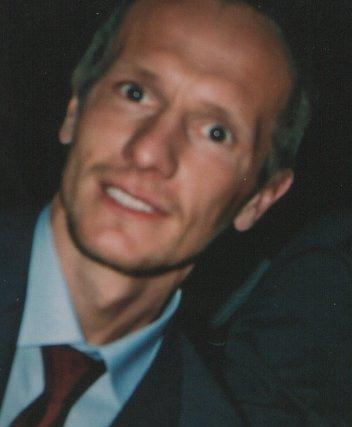
- Jacek Krzyżaniak, 1997 Polish champion

The 1997 Polish Speedway season was the 1997 season of motorcycle speedway in Poland.

== Individual ==
=== Polish Individual Speedway Championship ===
The 1997 Individual Speedway Polish Championship final was held on 15 August at Częstochowa. Jacek Krzyżaniak won the Polish title.

Pos.	Rider	Club	Total	Points
1	Jacek Krzyżaniak	Toruń	13 +3	(3,2,3,3,2)
2	Sławomir Drabik	Częstochowa	13 +2	(3,3,3,1,3)
3	Tomasz Gollob	Bydgoszcz	11	(3,u,3,2,3)
4	Mirosław Kowalik	Toruń	10	(3,w,3,3,1)
5	Jacek Gollob	Bydgoszcz	10	(2,3,2,2,1)
6	Piotr Protasiewicz	Bydgoszcz	9	(w,2,2,3,2)
7	Sebastian Ułamek	Częstochowa	8	(d,3,1,1,3)
8	Andrzej Huszcza	Zielona Góra	8	(1,1,d,3,3)
9	Damian Baliński	Leszno	8	(2,1,2,2,1)
10	Jacek Rempała (res)	Tarnów	8	(3,1,0,2,2)
11	Wojciech Załuski	Gdańsk	7	(2,2,2,1,d)
12	Grzegorz Rempała	Rzeszów	5	(2,0,1,0,2)
13	Maciej Kuciapa	Rzeszów	4	(1,1,0,1,1)
14	Janusz Stachyra	Rzeszów	3	(1,2,0,w,t)
15	Sławomir Dudek	Zielona Góra	2	(1,d,1,0,0)
16	Tomasz Fajfer	Gniezno	1	(0,1,0,0,0)
17	Adam Pawliczek	Rybnik	0	(d,–,–,–,–)
18	Andrejs Koroļevs (res)	Leszno	0	(d)

=== Golden Helmet ===
The 1997 Golden Golden Helmet (Polish: Turniej o Złoty Kask, ZK) organised by the Polish Motor Union (PZM) was the 1997 event for the league's leading riders. The final was held at Wrocław on the 3 October. Tomasz Gollob won his fourth Golden Helmet Championship.

Pos.	Rider	Club	Total	Points
1	Tomasz Gollob	Bydgoszcz	13	(2,3,2,3,3)
2	Tomasz Bajerski	Gorzów Wlkp.	12	(1,3,3,2,3)
3	Sebastian Ułamek	Częstochowa	11	(2,2,2,3,2)
4	Jacek Gollob	Bydgoszcz	11	(3,3,d,3,2)
5	Sławomir Drabik	Częstochowa	10	(1,3,3,3,0)
6	Piotr Protasiewicz	Bydgoszcz	9	(3,2,2,2,w)
7	Piotr Świst	Gorzów Wlkp.	9	(2,2,3,1,1)
8	Rafał Dobrucki	Piła	7	(3,0,1,1,2)
9	Jacek Krzyżaniak	Toruń	7	(3,1,2,t,1)
10	Dariusz Śledź	Wrocław	7	(d,1,1,2,3)
11	Mirosław Kowalik	Toruń	7	(2,1,3,1,t)
12	Roman Jankowski	Leszno	5	(0,2,d,0,3)
13	Wojciech Załuski	Gdańsk	5	(0,1,1,1,2)
14	Zenon Kasprzak	Rawicz	3	(,1,0,1,0,1)
15	Paweł Staszek	Grudziądz	1	(1,0,0,0,0)
16	Robert Dados	Grudziądz	0	(0,0,0,0,u)

=== Junior Championship ===
- winner - Grzegorz Walasek

=== Silver Helmet ===
- winner - Rafał Dobrucki

=== Bronze Helmet ===
- winner - Rafał Okoniewski

== Pairs ==
=== Polish Pairs Speedway Championship ===
The 1997 Polish Pairs Speedway Championship was the 1997 edition of the Polish Pairs Speedway Championship. The final was held on 20 June at Bydgoszcz.

Pos	Team	Pts	Riders
1	Polonia Bydgoszcz	29	Tomasz Gollob 12, Piotr Protasiewicz 11, Jacek Gollob 6
2	Apator Toruń	21+3	Jacek Krzyżaniak 11+3, Mirosław Kowalik 10
3	Gorzów Wlkp.	21+2	Piotr Świst 12, Tomasz Bajerski 9+2
4	Włókniarz Częstochowa	18	Sławomir Drabik 12, Sebastian Ułamek 6
5	Atlas Wrocław	14	Dariusz Śledź 12, Waldemar Szuba 2, Zbigniew Lech 0
6	GKM Grudziądz	12	Robert Kempiński 3, Paweł Staszek 3, Robert Dados 6
7	Start Gniezno	11	Robert Sawina 10, Adam Fajfer 0, Tomasz Fajfer 1

== Team ==
=== Team Speedway Polish Championship ===
The 1997 Team Speedway Polish Championship was the 1997 edition of the Team Polish Championship. Polonia Bydgoszcz won the gold medal. The team included the Gollob brothers, Piotr Protasiewicz and Henrik Gustafsson.

==== First Division ====
Pos	Team	Pts	W	D	L	Diff
1	Polonia Bydgoszcz	25	12	1	5	+147
2	Stal Gorzów Wielkopolski	24	11	2	5	+65
3	Polonia Piła	22	10	2	6	+34
4	Apator Toruń	21	10	1	7	+51
5	Unia Leszno	18	8	2	8	+43
6	ZKŻ Zielona Góra	17	8	1	9	–21
7	Stal Rzeszów	16	7	2	9	+35
8	Start Gniezno	15	7	1	10	–123
9	Włókniarz Częstochowa	14	7	0	11	–74
10	Atlas Wrocław	8	4	0	14	–157

Play offs

Team	Team	Team	Score
semi final	Toruń	Bydgoszcz	43:47, 26:64
semi final	Piła	Gorzów	47:43, 41:48
final	Gorzów	Bydgoszcz	46:44, 30:60

==== Second Division ====
Pos	Team	Pts	W	D	L	Diff
1	GKM Grudziądz	34	17	0	3	+500
2	Ostrów	31	15	1	4	+315
3	Unia Tarnów	30	15	0	5	+304
4	Wybrzeże Gdańsk	30	15	0	5	+341
5	Łódź	24	12	0	8	+176
6	RKM Rybnik	23	11	1	8	+93
7	Kolejarz Rawicz	22	11	0	9	+26
8	Kolejarz Opole	11	5	1	14	–297
9	ŻKS Krosno	6	3	0	17	–463
10	LKŻ Lublin	5	2	1	17	–375
11	Wanda Kraków	4	2	0	18	–620
