= 1999 Polish speedway season =

Motorcycle racing competition

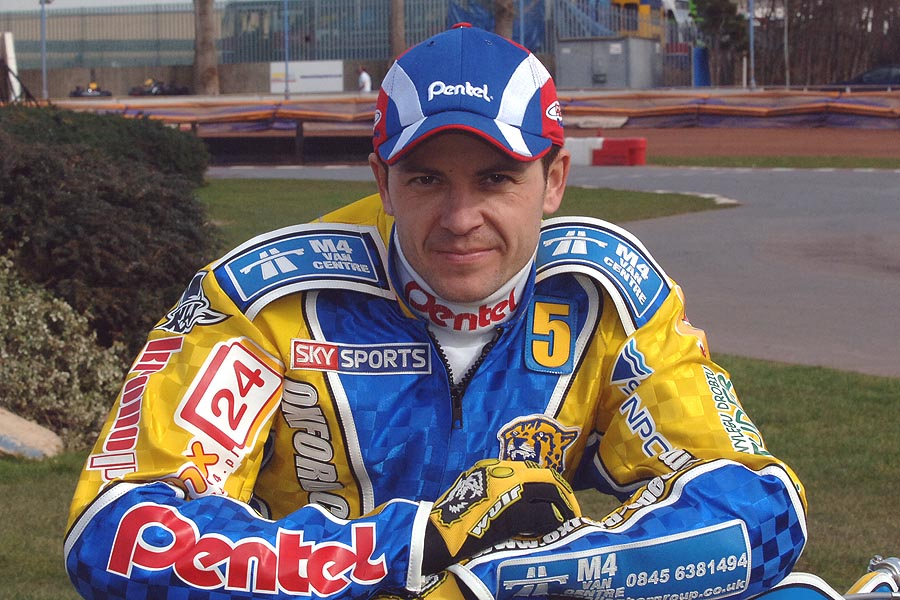
- Piotr Protasiewicz, 1999 Polish champion

The 1999 Polish Speedway season was the 1999 season of motorcycle speedway in Poland.

== Individual ==
=== Polish Individual Speedway Championship ===
The 1999 Individual Speedway Polish Championship final was held on 20 August at Bydgoszcz.

Pos.	Rider	Club	Total	Points
1	Piotr Protasiewicz	Bydgoszcz	14 +3	(2,3,3,3,3)
2	Tomasz Gollob	Bydgoszcz	14 +2	(3,3,3,2,3)
3	Jacek Krzyżaniak	Wrocław	11 +3	(3,2,2,1,3)
4	Jacek Gollob	Piła	11 +2	(3,3,1,2,2)
5	Robert Dados	Grudziądz	10	(1,1,3,3,2)
6	Damian Baliński	Leszno	9	(1,w,2,3,3)
7	Dariusz Śledź	Wrocław	9	(3,1,2,1,2)
8	Robert Sawina	Gniezno	8	(0,2,2,3,1)
9	Piotr Baron	Wrocław	8	(1,2,1,2,2)
10	Sławomir Drabik	Częstochowa	6	(2,2,1,0,1)
11	Andrzej Huszcza	Zielona Góra	5	(0,3,0,1,1)
12	Tomasz Bajerski	Gorzów Wlkp.	5	(0,1,3,0,1)
13	Adam Łabędzki	Wrocław	3	(2,1,0,0,0)
14	Jacek Rempała	Grudziądz	3	(0,0,1,2,d)
15	Wiesław Jaguś	Toruń	3	(2,0,0,1,d)
16	Adam Pawliczek	Rybnik	1	(0,0,d,d,–)
17	Andy Smith (res)	Piła	0	(d)

=== Golden Helmet ===
The 1999 Golden Golden Helmet (Polish: Turniej o Złoty Kask, ZK) organised by the Polish Motor Union (PZM) was the 1999 event for the league's leading riders. The final was held at Wrocław on the 18 September.

Pos.	Rider	Club	Total	Points
1	Jacek Krzyżaniak	Wrocław	12	(0,3,3,3,3)
2	Robert Sawina	Gniezno	11 +3	(3,2,1,3,2)
3	Rafał Dobrucki	Piła	11 +2	(2,2,2,3,2)
4	Jacek Gollob	Piła	10	(3,3,2,2,d)
5	Rafał Okoniewski	Gorzów Wlkp.	10	(1,2,3,1,3)
6	Sebastian Ułamek	Gdańsk	9	(3,3,d,1,2)
7	Robert Dados	Grudziądz	9	(2,3,3,1,d)
8	Adam Pawliczek	Rybnik	9	(3,1,1,2,2)
9	Grzegorz Rempała	Rzeszów	8	(2,2,3,0,1)
10	Piotr Świst (res)	Rzeszów	8	(2,0,2,3,1)
11	Roman Jankowski	Leszno	7	(0,0,1,3,3)
12	Andrzej Huszcza	Zielona Góra	7	(2,0,2,2,1)
13	Mariusz Staszewski	Częstochowa	5	(1,1,2,1,0)
14	Wiesław Jaguś	Toruń	2	(1,1,0,d,0)
15	Sławomir Drabik	Częstochowa	1	(d,0,1,d,–)
16	Zenon Kasprzak (res)	Świętochłowice	1	(0,0,0,1)
17	Tomasz Gollob	Bydgoszcz	0	(u/ns,–,–,–,–)
17	Piotr Protasiewicz	Bydgoszcz	0	(u/ns,–,–,–,–)

=== Junior Championship ===
- winner - Rafał Okoniewski

=== Silver Helmet ===
- winner - Mariusz Franków

=== Bronze Helmet ===
- winner - Rafał Okoniewski

== Pairs ==
=== Polish Pairs Speedway Championship ===
The 1999 Polish Pairs Speedway Championship was the 1999 edition of the Polish Pairs Speedway Championship. The final was held on 18 June at Bydgoszcz.

Pos	Team	Pts	Riders
1	Polonia Bydgoszcz	29	Tomasz Gollob 16, Piotr Protasiewicz 13
2	Unia Leszno	22	Roman Jankowski 13, Adam Skórnicki 9
3	Atlas Wrocław	19	Adam Łabędzki 4, Jacek Krzyżaniak 10, Dariusz Śledź 5
4	Zielona Góra	15	Andrzej Huszcza 9, Grzegorz Kłopot 0, Grzegorz Walasek 6
5	Włókniarz Częstochowa	15	Sławomir Drabik 12, Mariusz Staszewski 1, Artur Pietrzyk 2
6	Wybrzeże Gdańsk	14	Sebastian Ułamek 5, Adam Fajfer 5, Krzysztof Pecyna 4
7	Grudziądz	12	Jacek Rempała 7, Robert Dados 4, Jarosław Szymkowiak 1

== Team ==
=== Team Speedway Polish Championship ===
The 1999 Team Speedway Polish Championship was the 1999 edition of the Team Polish Championship. Polonia Piła won the gold medal for the first time in their history. The team included Hans Nielsen, Rafał Dobrucki and Jacek Gollob.

A new format would be introduced the following year which resulted in three teams being relegated from the First division and seven teams relegated from the Second division.

==== First Division ====
Pos	Team	Pts	W	D	L	Diff
1	Polonia Bydgoszcz	24	12	0	6	+118
2	Polonia Piła	23	10	3	5	+14
3	Wybrzeże Gdańsk	21	10	1	7	+63
4	Atlas Wrocław	20	10	0	8	+8
5	Unia Leszno	18	9	0	9	+11
6	Stal Gorzów Wielkopolski	18	9	0	9	–73
7	Apator Toruń	17	8	1	9	–32
8	GKM Grudziądz	15	7	1	10	–67
9	Stal Rzeszów	13	6	1	11	–59
10	Start Gniezno	11	5	1	12	–110

Play offs

Team	Team	Team	Score
semi final	Wrocław	Bydgoszcz	40:50, 53:36
semi final	Piła	Gdańsk	52:37, 52:38
final	Wrocław	Piła	48:42, 41:49

==== Second Division ====
Pos	Team	Pts	W	D	L	Diff
1	Włókniarz Częstochowa	40	20	0	4	+429
2	ZKŻ Zielona Góra	38	18	2	4	+390
3	Kolejarz Opole	35	17	1	6	+236
4	Ostrów	34	16	2	6	+298
5	RKM Rybnik	33	16	1	7	+313
6	ŁTŻ Łódź	31	15	1	8	+242
7	LKŻ Lublin	19	9	1	14	–238
8	Kolejarz Rawicz	18	9	0	15	–142
9	ŻKS Krosno	18	9	0	15	–159
10	Unia Tarnów	18	9	0	15	–140
11	Stal Rzeszów II	14	7	0	17	–21
12	Śląsk Świętochłowice	8	4	0	20	–477
13	Wanda Kraków	6	3	0	21	–541
