= 1999 Speedway Grand Prix of Czech Republic =

Information
- Date: 8 May 1999
- City: (Czech Republic) Prague
- Event: 1 of 6 (25)
- Referee: (United Kingdom) Anthony Steele

Stadium details
- Stadium: Marketa Stadium
- Track: speedway track

SGP Results
- Best Time
- (gold) Winner: (Poland) Tomasz Gollob
- (silver) Runner-up: (United States) Greg Hancock
- (bronze) 3rd place: (Australia) Jason Crump

The 1999 Speedway Grand Prix of Czech Republic was the first race of the 1999 Speedway Grand Prix season. It took place on 8 May in the Marketa Stadium in Prague, Czech Republic It was the third Czech Republic SGP and was won by Pole Tomasz Gollob.

== Starting positions draw ==
The Speedway Grand Prix Commission nominated Antonín Šváb Jr. (from Czech Republic) and Piotr Protasiewicz (from Poland) as Wild Card.

== Heat details ==
Placing	Draw	Rider	Total	Pre-Main Event										Main Event										Final Event
Placing	Draw	Rider	Total	Round 1						Round 2				Round 1						Round 2				1/2		CF	F
Placing	Draw	Rider	Total	1	2	3	4	5	6	7	8	9	10	11	12	13	14	15	16	17	18	19	20	21	22	23	24
1	3	(Poland) (3) Tomasz Gollob	25													2					4	1		1			1
2	6	(United States) (6) Greg Hancock	20													1				1				2			2
3	8	(Australia) (8) Jason Crump	18											2							3		1		2		3
4	2	(Sweden) (2) Jimmy Nilsen	16												1						1				1		4
5	11	(Czech Republic) (11) Antonín Kasper Jr.	15			1				1				1						3		2			4	1
6	20	(Denmark) (20) John Jørgensen	14				2			3		2					3		1				2	3		2
7	19	(United Kingdom) (19) Joe Screen	12			4			1				1				1				2			4X		3
8	17	(Sweden) (17) Stefan Dannö	10	2							1				2					2					3	4
9	5	(United Kingdom) (5) Chris Louis	8														2			4			3
10	10	(Sweden) (10) Peter Karlsson	8		1						2			4					2			3
11	1	(Sweden) (1) Tony Rickardsson	7											3				1				4R
12	18	(Sweden) (18) Mikael Karlsson	7		2					2					4			2					4R
13	4	(Denmark) (4) Hans Nielsen	6														4X	3
14	7	(Australia) (7) Ryan Sullivan	6												3				3
15	15	(Sweden) (15) Henrik Gustafsson	5		4			1				1				4X			4
16	16	(United Kingdom) (16) Andy Smith	5	3				2					2			3F		4M
Placing	Draw	Rider	Total	1	2	3	4	5	6	7	8	9	10	11	12	13	14	15	16	17	18	19	20	21	22	23	24
17	13	(Australia) (13) Leigh Adams	4				3		2			3
18	21	(Poland) (21) Robert Dados	4				1				3		3
19	9	(Denmark) (9) Brian Karger	3	1						4			4
20	14	(Denmark) (14) Brian Andersen	3			2					4	4M
21	22	(United States) (22) Billy Hamill	2			3		3
22	23	(Czech Republic) (23) Antonín Šváb Jr.	2		3				3
23	12	(Czech Republic) (12) Marian Jirout	1				4	4
24	24	(Poland) (24) Piotr Protasiewicz	1	4					4

Heats 1-10: Pre-Main Event 1-4: First round 5-6: Last chance for second round 7-8: Second round 9-10: Last chance Main Event	Heats 11-20: Main Event 11-14: First round 15-16: Last chance for second round 17-18: Second round 19-20: Last chance for Semi-Finals	Heats 21-24: Final Event 21-22: Semi-Finals 23: Consolation Final 24: The Big Final

gate A – inside	gate B	gate C	gate D – outside

== The intermediate classification ==
Qualifies for next season's Grand Prix series
Full-time Grand Prix rider
Wild card, track reserve or qualified reserve

Pos.	Rider	Points	CZE (Czech Republic)	SWE (Sweden)	POL (Poland)	GBR (United Kingdom)	PL2 (Poland)	DEN (Denmark)
1	(Poland) (3) Tomasz Gollob	25	25					
2	(United States) (6) Greg Hancock	20	20					
3	(Australia) (8) Jason Crump	18	18					
4	(Sweden) (2) Jimmy Nilsen	16	16					
5	(Czech Republic) (11) Antonín Kasper Jr.	15	15					
6	(Denmark) (20) John Jørgensen	14	14					
7	(United Kingdom) (19) Joe Screen	12	12					
8	(Sweden) (17) Stefan Dannö	10	10					
9	(United Kingdom) (5) Chris Louis	8	8					
10	(Sweden) (10) Peter Karlsson	8	8					
11	(Sweden) (1) Tony Rickardsson	7	7					
12	(Sweden) (18) Mikael Karlsson	7	7					
13	(Denmark) (4) Hans Nielsen	6	6					
14	(Australia) (7) Ryan Sullivan	6	6					
15	(Sweden) (15) Henrik Gustafsson	5	5					
16	(United Kingdom) (16) Andy Smith	5	5					
17	(Australia) (13) Leigh Adams	4	4					
18	(Poland) (21) Robert Dados	4	4					
19	(Denmark) (9) Brian Karger	3	3					
20	(Denmark) (14) Brian Andersen	3	3					
21	(United States) (22) Billy Hamill	2	2					
22	(Czech Republic) (23) Antonín Šváb Jr.	2	2					
23	(Czech Republic) (12) Marian Jirout	1	1					
24	(Poland) (24) Piotr Protasiewicz	1	1					
Pos.	Rider	Points	CZE (Czech Republic)	SWE (Sweden)	POL (Poland)	GBR (United Kingdom)	PL2 (Poland)	DEN (Denmark)

== See also ==
- Speedway Grand Prix
- List of Speedway Grand Prix riders
