= 1998 Polish speedway season =

Motorcycle racing competition

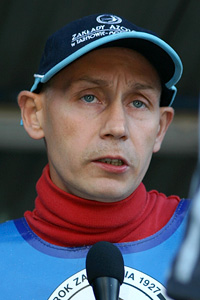
- Jacek Gollob; 1998 Polish champion, Golden Helmet winner and league champion with Polonia Bydgoszcz

The 1998 Polish Speedway season was the 1998 season of motorcycle speedway in Poland.

== Individual ==
=== Polish Individual Speedway Championship ===
The 1998 Individual Speedway Polish Championship final was held on 15 August at Bydgoszcz.

| Pos. | Rider | Club | Total | Points |
|---|---|---|---|---|
| 1 | Jacek Gollob | Bydgoszcz | 14 | (3,3,3,3,2) |
| 2 | Tomasz Gollob | Bydgoszcz | 13 | (3,2,2,3,3) |
| 3 | Wiesław Jaguś | Toruń | 11 +3 | (0,3,3,3,2) |
| 4 | Mariusz Staszewski | Częstochowa | 11 +2 | (2,3,2,1,3) |
| 5 | Jacek Krzyżaniak | Toruń | 10 | (2,2,3,2,1) |
| 6 | Sebastian Ułamek | Częstochowa | 9 | (3,0,1,2,3) |
| 7 | Piotr Protasiewicz | Bydgoszcz | 9 | (3,1,3,d,2) |
| 8 | Piotr Świst | Rzeszów | 8 | (2,3,0,3,d) |
| 9 | Damian Baliński | Leszno | 6 | (0,2,2,0,2) |
| 10 | Andrzej Huszcza | Zielona Góra | 5 | (2,1,0,1,1) |
| 11 | Adam Pawliczek | Rybnik | 5 | (0,1,1,2,1) |
| 12 | Rafał Dobrucki | Piła | 5 | (1,1,1,1,1) |
| 13 | Sławomir Drabik | Częstochowa | 4 | (1,2,1,0,d) |
| 14 | Jacek Rempała | Grudziądz | 3 | (0,0,2,1,0) |
| 15 | Tomasz Cieślewicz (res) | Gdańsk | 3 | (3) |
| 16 | Adam Fajfer (res) | Gniezno | 2 | (2) |
| 17 | Marek Dera | Gdańsk | 1 | (1,0,0,u,d) |
| 18 | Adam Łabędzki | Wrocław | 1 | (1,w,–,–,–) |

=== Golden Helmet ===
The 1998 Golden Golden Helmet (Polish: Turniej o Złoty Kask, ZK) organised by the Polish Motor Union (PZM) was the 1998 event for the league's leading riders. The final was held at Wrocław on the 25 September.

| Pos. | Rider | Club | Total | Points |
|---|---|---|---|---|
| 1 | Jacek Gollob | Bydgoszcz | 14 | (3,3,3,2,3) |
| 2 | Rafał Dobrucki | Piła | 12 | (3,3,2,1,3) |
| 3 | Piotr Świst | Rzeszów | 11 | (1,2,3,3,2) |
| 4 | Adam Fajfer | Gniezno | 10 | (1,1,3,2,3) |
| 5 | Robert Dados | Grudziądz | 9 | (3,3,0,3,0) |
| 6 | Piotr Protasiewicz | Bydgoszcz | 9 | (2,d,3,3,1) |
| 7 | Roman Jankowski | Leszno | 8 | (3,3,1,0,1) |
| 8 | Jacek Krzyżaniak | Toruń | 8 | (2,1,1,3,1) |
| 9 | Tomasz Cieślewicz | Gdańsk | 7 | (2,2,0,2,1) |
| 10 | Adam Łabędzki | Wrocław | 6 | (0,2,0,1,3) |
| 11 | Marek Dera | Gdańsk | 6 | (0,2,1,1,2) |
| 12 | Dariusz Śledź | Wrocław | 6 | (1,1,2,0,2) |
| 13 | Mirosław Kowalik | Toruń | 5 | (1,0,2,2,0) |
| 14 | Sławomir Drabik | Częstochowa | 5 | (d,0,2,1,2) |
| 15 | Grzegorz Walasek | Zielona Góra | 3 | (2,0,1,0,0) |
| 16 | Rafał Haj | Wrocław | 1 | (0,1,0,0,0) |
| 17 | Bartosz Stanek (res) | Wrocław | ns | |
| 18 | Artur Bogińczuk (res) | Wrocław | ns | |

=== Junior Championship ===
- winner - Robert Dados

=== Silver Helmet ===
- winner - Rafał Okoniewski

=== Bronze Helmet ===
- winner - Rafał Okoniewski

== Pairs ==
=== Polish Pairs Speedway Championship ===
The 1998 Polish Pairs Speedway Championship was the 1998 edition of the Polish Pairs Speedway Championship. The final was held on 11 July at Gorzów Wielkopolski.

| Pos | Team | Pts | Riders |
|---|---|---|---|
| 1 | Gorzów Wlkp. | 28 | Tomasz Bajerski 18, Krzysztof Cegielski 10 |
| 2 | Polonia Bydgoszcz | 24 | Tomasz Gollob 14, Jacek Gollob 1, Piotr Protasiewicz 9 |
| 3 | Start Gniezno | 20 | Adam Fajfer 13, Tomasz Fajfer 7 |
| 4 | Włókniarz Częstochowa | 17 | Sebastian Ułamek 11, Mariusz Staszewski 6 |
| 5 | Atlas Wrocław | 15 | Adam Łabędzki 11, Mirosław Cierniak 1, Dariusz Śledź 3 |
| 6 | Stal Rzeszów | 11 | Piotr Świst 8, Janusz Stachyra 2, Grzegorz Rempała 1 |
| 7 | Zielona Góra | 11 | Andrzej Huszcza 9, Jarosław Szymkowiak 2 |

== Team ==
=== Team Speedway Polish Championship ===
The 1998 Team Speedway Polish Championship was the 1998 edition of the Team Polish Championship. Polonia Bydgoszcz won the gold medal for the second successive season. The team included the Gollob brothers, Piotr Protasiewicz Andy Smith and Henrik Gustafsson.

==== First Division ====
| Pos | Team | Pts | W | D | L | Diff |
|---|---|---|---|---|---|---|
| 1 | Polonia Bydgoszcz | 29 | 14 | 1 | 3 | +250 |
| 2 | Polonia Piła | 26 | 2 | 2 | 4 | +181 |
| 3 | Unia Leszno | 26 | 13 | 0 | 5 | +75 |
| 4 | Stal Rzeszów | 19 | 9 | 1 | 8 | +93 |
| 5 | Apator Toruń | 18 | 9 | 0 | 9 | +27 |
| 6 | Start Gniezno | 17 | 8 | 1 | 9 | +11 |
| 7 | GKM Grudziądz | 17 | 8 | 1 | 9 | –29 |
| 8 | Stal Gorzów Wielkopolski | 16 | 8 | 0 | 10 | –11 |
| 9 | ZKŻ Zielona Góra | 10 | 5 | 0 | 13 | –180 |
| 10 | Ostrów | 2 | 1 | 0 | 17 | –417 |

Play offs

| Team | Team | Team | Score |
|---|---|---|---|
| semi final | Rzeszów | Bydgoszcz | 50:40, 33:57 |
| semi final | Leszno | Piła | 47:43, 27:62 |
| final | Piła | Bydgoszcz | 41:49, 42:48 |

==== Second Division ====
| Pos | Team | Pts | W | D | L | Diff |
|---|---|---|---|---|---|---|
| 1 | Atlas Wrocław | 40 | 20 | 0 | 2 | +607 |
| 2 | Wybrzeże Gdańsk | 38 | 19 | 0 | 3 | +657 |
| 3 | Włókniarz Częstochowa | 36 | 18 | 0 | 4 | +559 |
| 4 | RKM Rybnik | 32 | 16 | 0 | 6 | +22 |
| 5 | Unia Tarnów | 26 | 13 | 0 | 9 | +65 |
| 6 | Kolejarz Rawicz | 24 | 11 | 2 | 9 | +0 |
| 7 | Łódź | 19 | 9 | 1 | 12 | –14 |
| 8 | LKŻ Lublin | 15 | 7 | 1 | 14 | –310 |
| 9 | ŻKS Krosno | 14 | 6 | 2 | 14 | –303 |
| 10 | Kolejarz Opole | 12 | 6 | 0 | 16 | –211 |
| 11 | Wanda Kraków | 8 | 4 | 0 | 18 | –513 |
| 12 | Śląsk Świętochłowice | 0 | 0 | 0 | 22 | –631 |
