= Robert Dados =

Polish speedway rider

- Born: 15 February 1977; Poland
- Died: 30 March 2004 (aged 27); Lublin, Poland
- Nationality: Polish

Career history

Poland
- 1993–1995: Lublin
- 1996–2000: Grudziądz
- 2001–2003: Wrocław
- 2004: Lublin

Denmark
- 2001: Herning
- 2002: Outrup

Sweden
- 2000–2003: Indianerna

Individual honours
- 1998: World U-21 Champion
- 1998: Polish U-21 Champion

Team honours
- 1998: Team U-21 Polish Champion

Robert Dados (15 February 1977 in Poland – 30 March 2004 in Lublin, Poland) was a speedway rider from Poland.

== Career ==
Dados came to prominence after lifting the World Under-21 title in 1998. By winning the championship, he automatically qualified to the 1999 Speedway Grand Prix.

== Major results ==
=== Speedway Grand Prix ===
- Individual World Championship
  - 1998 - 33rd place (1 point)
  - 1999 - 21st place (20 points)
  - 2003 - 39th place (3 points)

1998 Speedway Grand Prix Final Championship standings (Riding No 23)
Race no.	Grand Prix	Pos.	Pts.	Heats	Draw No
6 /6	(Poland) Polish SGP	24	1	(0,0)	23

1999 Speedway Grand Prix Final Championship standings (Riding No 21)
Race no.	Grand Prix	Pos.	Pts.	Heats	Draw No
1 /6	(Czech Republic) Czech Rep. SGP	18	4	(3,1,1)	21
2 /6	(Sweden) Swedish SGP	17	4	(1,2,1)	18
3 /6	(Poland) Polish SGP	18	4	(2,0,1)	16
4 /6	(United Kingdom) British SGP	21	1	(0,M)	17
5 /6	(Poland) Polish II SGP	22	2	(1,1)	21
6 /6	(Denmark) Danish SGP	16	5	(0,2,3) (X,0)	20

2003 Speedway Grand Prix Final Championship standings (Riding No 28)
Race no.	Grand Prix	Pos.	Pts.	Heats	Draw No
4 /9	(Denmark) Danish SGP	20	3	(1,3,0)	16

permanent speedway rider
wild card, track reserve or qualified reserve
rider not classified (track reserve who did not start)

=== Other ===
- Individual World U-21 Championship
  - 1998 - World Champion (14 points +3)
- Team World Championship
  - 1998 - 4th place (2 points)
- Individual Polish Championship
  - 1999 - 6th place
  - 2001 - 6th place
  - 2002 - 16th place
- Individual U-21 Polish Championship
  - 1995 - 14th place
  - 1997 - 16th place
  - 1998 - Polish Champion
- Polish Pairs Championship
  - 1997 - 6th place
  - 1999 - 7th place
  - 2000 - 7th place
  - 2002 - 6th place
- Polish U-21 Pairs Championship
  - 1994 - 6th place
  - 1995 - 7th place
  - 1997 - 4th place
  - 1998 - 5th place
- Team Polish Championship
  - 2001 - 2nd place
  - 2002 - 2nd place
- Team U-21 Polish Championship
  - 1998 - Polish Champion
  - 1999 - 3rd place
- Golden Helmet
  - 1997 - 16th place
  - 1998 - 5th place
  - 1999 - 7th place
  - 2002 - 11th place
- Silver Helmet (U-21)
  - 1995 - track reserve
  - 1997 - 4th place
  - 1998 - 12th place
- Bronze Helmet (U-19)
  - 1995 - 4th place
- Team Polish Cup
  - 2001 - 2nd place

== See also ==
- Poland national speedway team
- List of Speedway Grand Prix riders
- List of suicides (A–M)
