= 2003 Polish speedway season =

Motorcycle racing competition

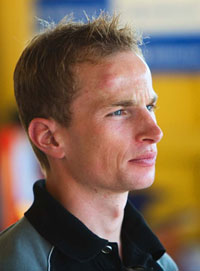
- Rune Holta, Norwegian born 2003 Polish champion

The 2003 Polish Speedway season was the 2003 season of motorcycle speedway in Poland.

== Individual ==
=== Polish Individual Speedway Championship ===
The 2003 Individual Speedway Polish Championship final was held on 15 August at Bydgoszcz.

Pos.	Rider	Club	Total	Points
1	Rune Holta	Częstochowa	15	(3,3,3,3,3)
2	Tomasz Gollob	Bydgoszcz	14	(3,3,2,3,3)
3	Tomasz Jędrzejak	Wrocław	12	(3,2,3,2,2)
4	Wiesław Jaguś	Toruń	10	(1,1,2,3,3)
5	Jarosław Hampel	Wrocław	10	(1,3,3,1,2)
6	Tomasz Bajerski	Toruń	9	(2,2,0,2,3)
7	Damian Baliński	Leszno	7	(2,1,d,3,1)
8	Rafał Dobrucki	Leszno	7	(0,2,2,1,2)
9	Sławomir Drabik	Wrocław	6	(0,1,3,2,0)
10	Rafał Okoniewski	Zielona Góra	6	(1,3,1,1,0)
11	Piotr Protasiewicz	Toruń	6	(2,2,2,0,w)
12	Stanisław Burza	Tarnów	6	(2,0,1,2,1)
13	Tomasz Chrzanowski	Gdańsk	5	(3,1,1,0,d)
14	Mariusz Staszewski	Rybnik	3	(1,0,0,0,2)
15	Mariusz Węgrzyk	Rybnik	3	(0,0,1,1,1)
16	Robert Kościecha	Gdańsk	1	(d,0,0,d,1)
17	Jacek Gollob (res)	Bydgoszcz	ns	
18	Dariusz Śledź (res)	Lublin	ns	

=== Golden Helmet ===
The 2003 Golden Golden Helmet (Polish: Turniej o Złoty Kask, ZK) organised by the Polish Motor Union (PZM) was the 2003 event for the league's leading riders. The final was held on the 18 October at Wrocław.

Pos.	Rider	Club	Total	Points
1	Rafał Okoniewski	Zielona Góra	14	(3,3,2,3,3)
2	Tomasz Jędrzejak	Wrocław	11 +3	(3,3,1,3,1)
3	Jarosław Hampel	Wrocław	11 +2	(3,2,3,d,3)
4	Wiesław Jaguś	Toruń	11 +1	(2,2,3,3,1)
5	Sebastian Ułamek	Częstochowa	10	(3,1,1,2)
6	Rafał Dobrucki	Leszno	10	(2,2,3,1,2)
7	Sławomir Drabik	Wrocław	8	(0,0,2,3,3)
8	Piotr Protasiewicz	Toruń	8	(2,3,2,d,1)
9	Grzegorz Walasek	Częstochowa	7	(2,1,2,2,0)
10	Andrzej Huszcza	Zielona Góra	6	(0,1,3,0,2)
11	Rafał Szombierski	Rybnik	5	(1,3,0,1,0)
12	Tomasz Gapiński	Piła	5	(1,2,0,1,1)
13	Maciej Kuciapa	Rzeszów	5	(1,1,1,2,0)
14	Krzysztof Jabłoński	Gniezno	5	(1,0,1,1,2)
15	Mariusz Węgrzyk	Rybnik	4	(0,d,0,2,2)
16	Tomasz Bajerski	Toruń	0	(0,0,d,–,–)

=== Junior Championship ===
- winner - Łukasz Romanek

=== Silver Helmet ===
- winner - Robert Miśkowiak

=== Bronze Helmet ===
- winner - Janusz Kołodziej

== Pairs ==
=== Polish Pairs Speedway Championship ===
The 2003 Polish Pairs Speedway Championship was the 2003 edition of the Polish Pairs Speedway Championship. The final was held on 1 August at Leszno.

Pos	Team	Pts	Riders
1	Unia Leszno	26	Rafał Dobrucki 12, Krzysztof Kasprzak 14
2	ZKŻ Zielona Góra	23	Rafał Okoniewski 14, Andrzej Huszcza 9
3	Apator Toruń	22	Piotr Protasiewicz 16, Wiesław Jaguś 6
4	Polonia Bydgoszcz	18	Tomasz Gollob 12, Jacek Gollob 6, Michał Robacki 0
5	Atlas Wrocław	18	Jarosław Hampel 6, Tomasz Jędrzejak 4, Sławomir Drabik 8
6	Stal Gorzów Wlkp.	10	Robert Flis 3, Piotr Paluch 7
7	Włókniarz Częstochowa	9	Sebastian Ułamek 8, Grzegorz Walasek 1, Artur Pietrzyk 0

== Team ==
=== Team Speedway Polish Championship ===
The 2003 Team Speedway Polish Championship was the 2003 edition of the Team Polish Championship. Włókniarz Częstochowa won the gold medal.

==== Ekstraliga ====
Pos	Team	P	W	D	L	Pts	Diff
1	Włókniarz Częstochowa	20	15	0	5	30	255
2	Apator Toruń	20	15	0	5	30	214
3	Polonia Bydgoszcz	20	11	0	5	22	-78
4	Atlas Wrocław	20	9	1	10	19	40
5	ZKŻ Zielona Góra	20	11	0	9	22	64
6	Unia Leszno	20	10	0	10	20	39
7	Gdańsk	20	4	1	15	9	-266
8	Polonia Piła	20	4	0	16	8	-268

==== 1.Liga ====
Pos	Team	P	W	D	L	Diff	Pts
1	RKM Rybnik	20	15	2	3	311	32
2	Unia Tarnów	20	14	1	5	243	29
3	TŻ Lublin	20	9	1	10	-64	19
4	Stal Gorzów Wielkopolski	20	9	1	10	-102	19
5	Start Gniezno	20	11	1	8	207	23
6	Stal Rzeszów	20	11	0	9	81	22
7	Kolejarz Rawicz	20	6	0	14	-190	12
8	WKM Warszawa	20	2	0	18	-486	4

==== 2.Liga ====
Pos	Team	P	W	D	L	Diff	Pts
1	GTŻ Grudziądz	10	10	0	0	271	20
2	Ostrów Wlkp.	10	7	0	3	167	14
3	TŻ Łódź	10	6	0	4	114	12
4	KSŻ Krosno	10	4	0	6	-92	8
5	Kolejarz Opole	10	3	0	7	-80	6
6	Wanda Kraków	10	0	0	10	-380	0

==== Promotion/relegation play offs ====
- Tarnów - Gdańsk 48–42, 48–42
- Ostrów - Rawicz 51–38, 48-42
