= Rafał Okoniewski =

Polish speedway rider

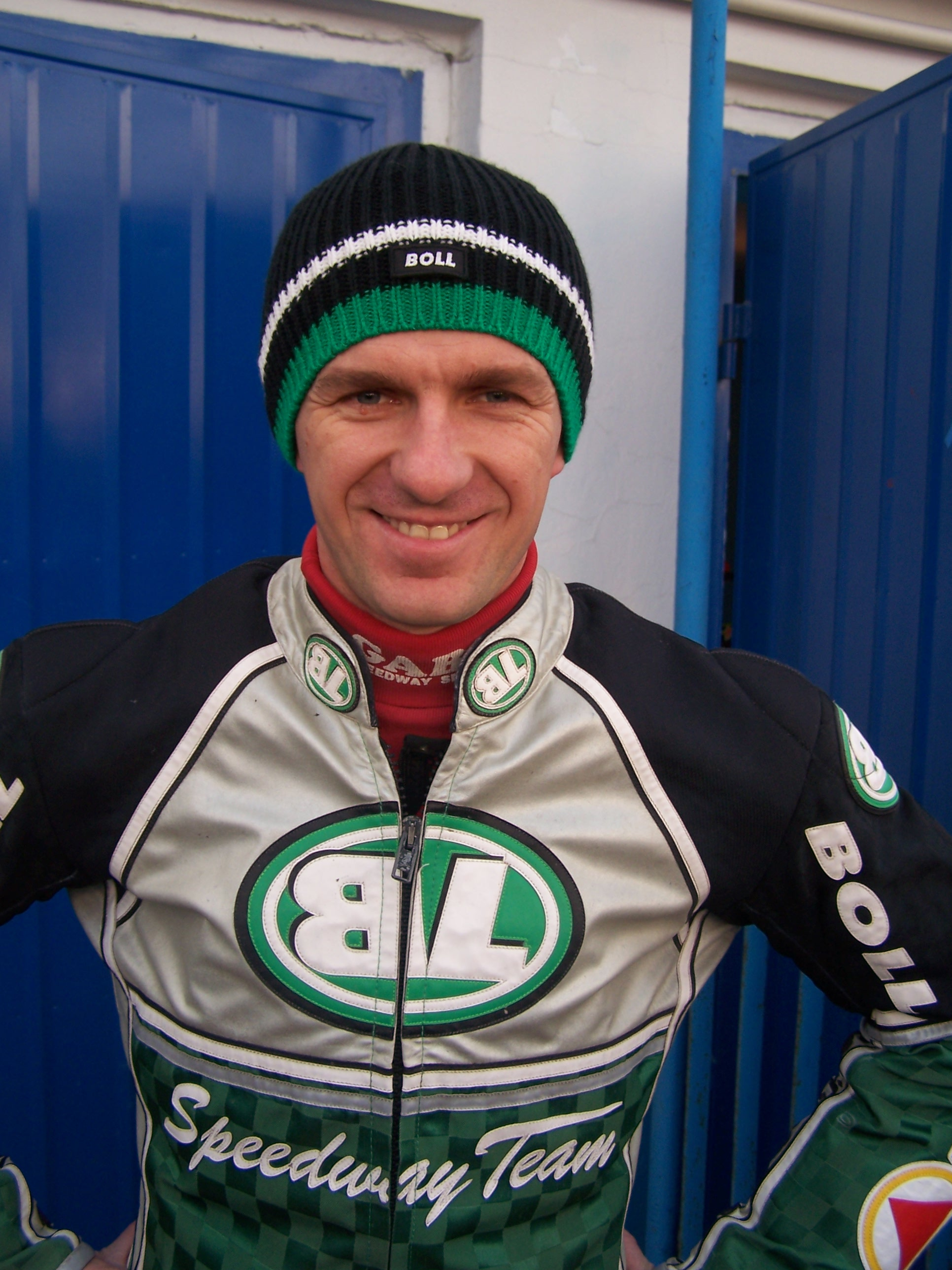
- Born: 26 January 1980 (age 46); Poland
- Nationality: Polish
- Website: Official website

Career history

Poland
- 1996-1998: Piła
- 1999-2001, 2009: Gorzów
- 2002: Leszno
- 2003-2006: Zielona Góra
- 2007–2008: Bydgoszcz
- 2010–2013: Rzeszów
- 2014–2017: Grudziądz
- 2018: Piła
- 2019: Łódź
- 2020: Ostrów

Sweden
- 2000–2004: Team Svelux/Luxo Stars
- 2003: Örnarna
- 2006–2007: Indianerna
- 2008–2009: Piraterna
- 2010–2011: Västervik
- 2012: Hammarby
- 2015: Lejonen

Individual honours
- 1998, 1999: European Under-19 Champion
- 1999, 2000: Polish Under-21 Champion
- 2003: Golden Helmet Winner
- 1998, 2001: Silver Helmet Winner
- 1997, 1998, 1999: Bronze Helmet Winner

Team honours
- 2009: European Club Champion

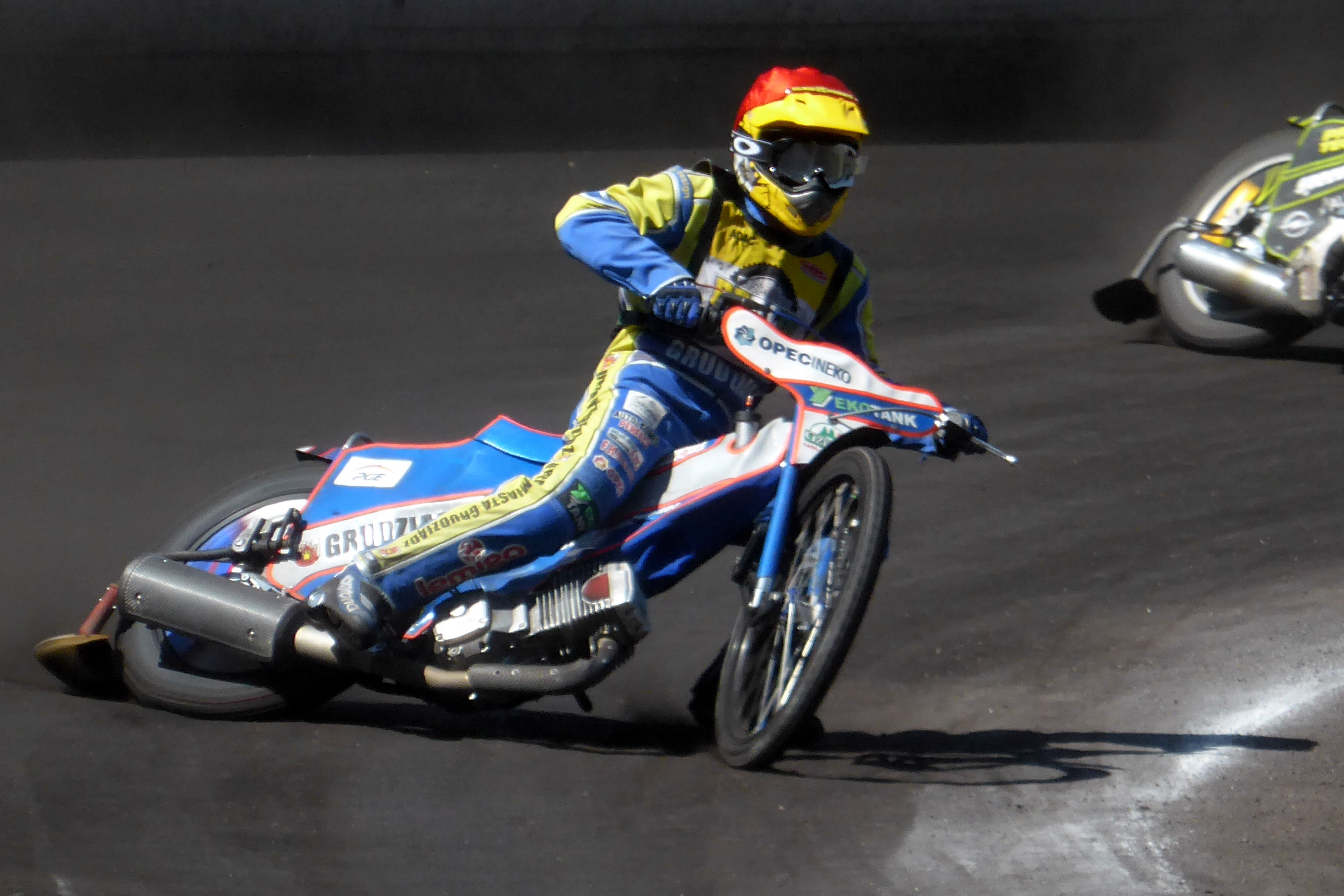
Okoniewski driving in the German Speedway Bundesliga

Rafał Okoniewski (born 26 January 1980) is a Polish former speedway rider.

== Career ==
Okoniewski started riding in 1996 and is the son of former speedway rider Mariusz Okoniewski (1956–2006). He is the only rider to win the U-19 European Championship twice, in 1998 and 1999.

Okoniewski retired from the sport in 2020.

== Results ==
=== World Championships ===
- Individual Under-21 World Championship
  - 1998 - 9th place (7 points)
  - 1999 - 6th place (10+e points)
  - 2000 - 5th place (10 points)
  - 2001 - 3rd place (10+3 points)

=== European Championships ===
- Individual Under-19 European Championship
  - 1998 - European Champion (15 points)
  - 1999 - European Champion (13+3 points)
- European Club Champions' Cup
  - 2009 - (Poland) Toruń - Winner (11 pts) Rivne

=== Polish competitions ===
- Individual Polish Championship
  - 2009 - 8th place in Quarter-Final 3
- Individual Under-21 Polish Championship
  - 1999 - Polish Champion
  - 2000 - Polish Champion
- Golden Helmet
  - 2003 - Winner
- Silver Helmet (U-21)
  - 1997 - 2nd place
  - 1998 - Winner
  - 2001 - Winner
- Bronze Helmet (U-19)
  - 1997 - Winner
  - 1998 - Winner
  - 1999 - Winner
