= 1998 Speedway World Team Cup =

39th edition of the annual motorcycle speedway World Cup competition

Seasons
- ← 1997 1999 →

The 1998 Speedway World Team Cup was the 39th edition of the FIM Speedway World Team Cup to determine the team world champions.

The final took place on 11 September at the Vojens Speedway Center in Denmark. The winners were the United States team who claimed their fifth title.

== First round ==
- 7 June 1998
- (Latvia) Stadium Lokomotīve, Daugavpils
- Austria and France withdrew

1st	2nd	3rd
Latvia 35; 10.Nikolay Kokin (2,1,3,3,2,2,3,2) - 18; 11.Vladimir Voronkov (3,3,3,1,3,3,1,e) - 17	Norway 29; 1.Lars Gunnestad (3,1,3,3,3,1,3,3) - 20; 2.Arnt Førland (2,1,2,1,2,e,0,1) - 9	Ukraine 27; 13.Igor Marko (1,2,2,2,3,2,e,2) - 14; 14.Aleksandr Lyatosinskiy (2,1,2,1,2,1,2,2) - 13

4th	5th	track reserve
Slovenia 26; 4.Matej Ferjan (1,0,3,1,3,2,3,3) - 16; 5.Tomas Šustersič (3,2,f,0,1,1,2,1) - 10	Italy 3; 7.Simone Terenzani (0,0,1,0,0,1,1,0) - 3; 8.Nicolo Andriolo (0,0,0,e,0,0,0,0) - 0	16.Aleksandr Biznya - ns 17.Maksim Andreev - ns

- Latvia and Norway to second round

== Second round ==
- 28 June 1998
- (Russia) Stroitel Stadium, Togliatti
- Norway withdrew and were replaced by Ukraine, England and Australia withdrew

1st	2nd	3rd
Czech Republic 39; 10.Marian Jirout (3,2,2,3,3,1) - 14; 11.Adrian Rymel (3,3,1,*,1,2) - 10; 12.Antonín Kasper Jr. (3,3,*,3,3,3) - 15	Hungary 35; 1.Zoltán Adorján (2,2,3,3,3,3) - 16; 2.Sándor Tihanyi (3,3,3,1,2,2) - 14; 3.Róbert Nagy (1,e,*,2,2,*) - 5	Russia 32; 7.Roman Povazhny - (1,2,2,2,2,3) - 12; 8.Sergej Darkin (2,3,2,2,2,2) - 13; 9.Oleg Kurguskin (1,2,*,1,3,*) - 7

4th	5th
Latvia 8; 13.Nikolay Kokin (1,1,0,1,1,f) - 4; 14. 15.Aleksandr Biznya (2,0,0,1,0,1) - 4	Ukraine 2; 4.Igor Marko (f,-,-,-,-,-) - 0; 5.Aleksandr Lyatosinskiy (0,1,1,0,0,-) - 2; 6.

- Czech Republic and Hungary to World final

== World Final ==
- 11 September 1998
- (Denmark) Speedway Center, Vojens

Placing	Pair / Rider Name	Total	1	2	3	4	5	6	7	8	9	10	11	12	13	14	15	16	17	18	19	20	21	22
1	(United States) USA	28							10							18							28
1	(1) Greg Hancock	12	2			3				1			2				2			2
1	(2) Billy Hamill	16	3			2				2			3				3			3
1	(15) Sam Ermolenko	0
2	Sweden	24							10							15							24
2	(5) Tony Rickardsson	5		3			2			0					-				-			-
2	(6) Jimmy Nilsen	13		2			3			3					0				3			2
2	(17) Peter Karlsson	6													2				1			3
3	Denmark	23							8							13							23
3	(11) Hans Nielsen	10			2				2				1		1			2					2
3	(12) Brian Karger	4			3				1				0		-			-					-
3	(20) Brian Andersen	9													3			3					3
4	Poland	17							4							12							17
4	(13) Tomasz Gollob	15				1			3			3				3			2		3
4	(14) Jacek Gollob	0				0			E			-				-			-		E
4	(21) Robert Dados	2										E				2			0
5	Germany	14							6							12							14
5	(9) Gerd Riss	1			1			-				-		-			-					-
5	(10) Robert Barth	6			0			3				1		0			1					1
5	(19) Matthias Kröger	7						2				2		3			0					E
6	Czech Republic	14							2							10							14
6	(3) Antonín Kasper Jr.	9	1				1				3			2				0			2
6	(4) Marian Jirout	5	0				0				2			1				1			1
6	(16) Adrian Rymel	0
7	Hungary	6							2							4							6
7	(7) Zoltán Adorján	5		1				1			1					0				1			1
7	(8) Sándor Tihanyi	1		0				0			0					1				0			0
7	(18) -	0
Placing	Pair / Rider Name	Total	1	2	3	4	5	6	7	8	9	10	11	12	13	14	15	16	17	18	19	20	21	22

m - exclusion for exceeding two minute time allowance • t - exclusion for touching the tapes • x - other exclusion • e - retired or mechanical failure • f - fell
ns - non-starter • nc - non-classify

gate A - inside	gate B	gate C	gate D - outside

== See also ==
- 1998 Speedway Grand Prix
