= 2001 Polish speedway season =

Motorcycle racing competition

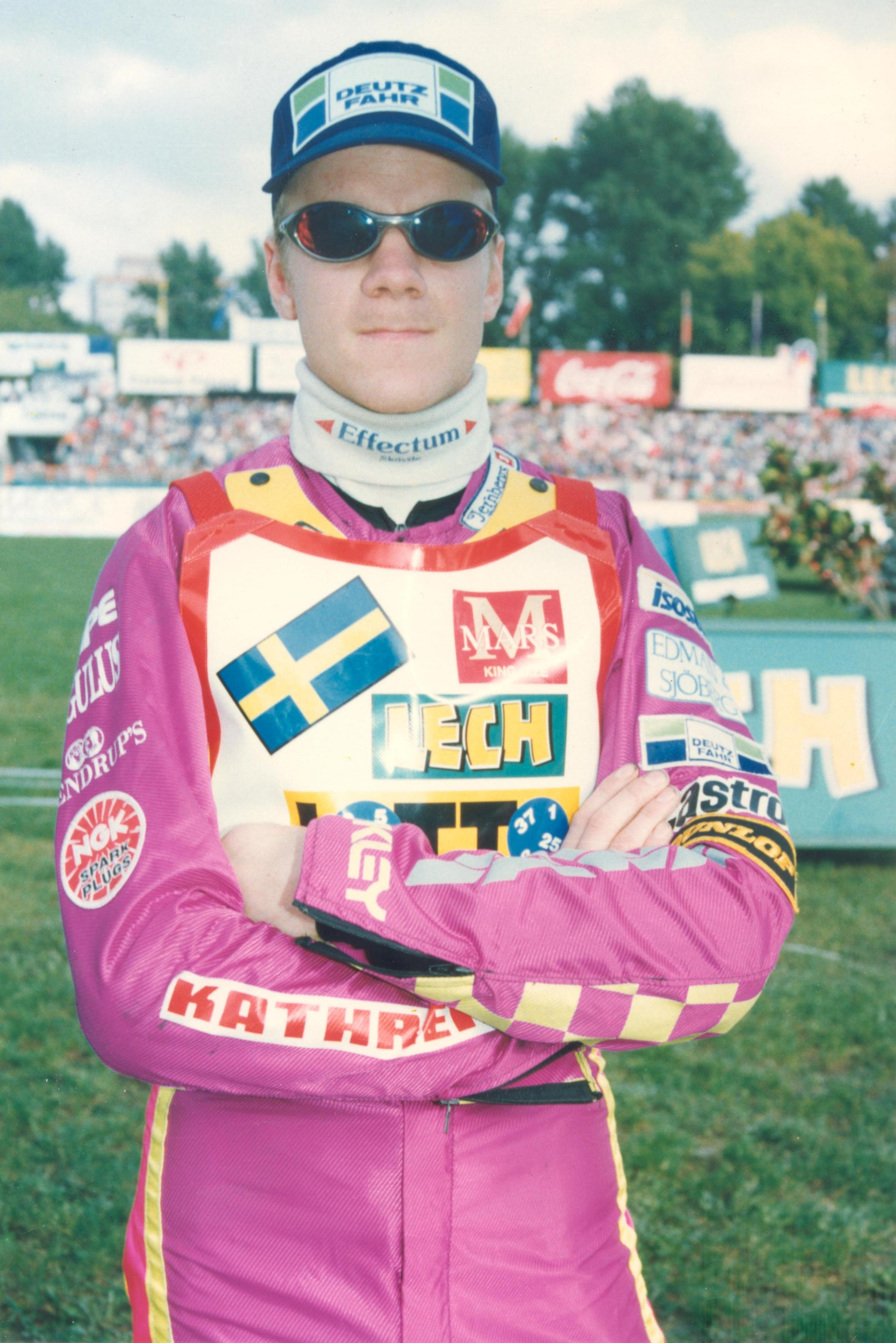
- Tony Rickardsson, the 2001 world champion helped Toruń win the gold medal

The 2001 Polish Speedway season was the 2001 season of motorcycle speedway in Poland.

== Individual ==
=== Polish Individual Speedway Championship ===
The 2001 Individual Speedway Polish Championship final was held on 15 August at Bydgoszcz.

Pos.	Rider	Club	Total	Points
1	Tomasz Gollob	Bydgoszcz	14	(3,2,3,3,3)
2	Robert Sawina	Wrocław	13 +3	(3,3,2,3,2)
3	Sebastian Ułamek	Wrocław	13 +2	(3,2,3,3,2)
4	Krzysztof Cegielski	Gdańsk	11	(3,3,1,1,3)
5	Mariusz Węgrzyk	Rybnik	9	(1,2,2,1,3)
6	Robert Dados	Wrocław	9	(2,1,1,2,3)
7	Wiesław Jaguś	Toruń	8	(0,3,2,2,1)
8	Jarosław Hampel	Piła	7	(0,3,0,3,1)
9	Piotr Świst	Gorzów Wlkp.	6	(2,u 3,0,1)
10	Jacek Rempała	Leszno	6	(1,0,1,2,2)
11	Sławomir Drabik	Piła	5	(2,1,0,2,0)
12	Jacek Gollob	Piła	4	(0,1,3,d,0)
13	Piotr Protasiewicz	Bydgoszcz	4	(1,2,0,0,1)
14	Grzegorz Walasek	Częstochowa	4	(0,1,2,1,0)
15	Mirosław Kowalik	Toruń	4	(2,0,1,1,t)
16	Andrzej Huszcza (res)	Zielona Góra	2	(2)
17	Tomasz Bajerski	Toruń	1	(1,0,0,0,0)
18	Rafał Okoniewski (res)	Gorzów Wlkp.	ns	

=== Golden Helmet ===
The 2001 Golden Golden Helmet (Polish: Turniej o Złoty Kask, ZK) organised by the Polish Motor Union (PZM) was the 2001 event for the league's leading riders. The final was held at Wrocław on the 21 September.

Pos.	Rider	Club	Total	Points
1	Piotr Protasiewicz	Bydgoszcz	15	(3,3,3,3,3)
2	Robert Sawina	Wrocław	14	(3,3,3,3,2)
3	Sebastian Ułamek	Wrocław	13	(2,2,3,3,3)
4	Tomasz Bajerski	Toruń	11	(3,t,2,3,3)
5	Mariusz Węgrzyk	Rybnik	10	(3,3,1,1,2)
6	Jarosław Hampel	Piła	8	(2,1,3,2,0)
7	Krzysztof Cegielski	Gdańsk	7	(d,0,2,2,3)
8	Jacek Krzyżaniak	Wrocław	7	(2,2,1,0,2)
9	Dariusz Śledź	Rybnik	7	(2,2,2,1,d)
10	Piotr Świst	Gorzów Wlkp.	7	(1,3,1,0,0)
11	Mirosław Kowalik	Toruń	5	(1,2,2,w,–)
12	Robert Kościecha	Toruń	4	(d,0,0,2,2)
13	Adam Fajfer	Gdańsk	4	(1,1,0,2,0)
14	Rafał Okoniewski	Gorzów Wlkp.	4	(0,1,1,1,1)
15	Robert Wardzała	Tarnów	3	(1,0,0,1,1)
16	Maciej Jąder	Ostrów Wlkp.	1	(0,0,0,0,1)
17	Wiesław Jaguś (res)	Toruń	1	(1,1)

=== Junior Championship ===
- winner - Jarosław Hampel

=== Silver Helmet ===
- winner - Rafał Okoniewski

=== Bronze Helmet ===
- winner - Rafał Szombierski

== Pairs ==
=== Polish Pairs Speedway Championship ===
The 2001 Polish Pairs Speedway Championship was the 2001 edition of the Polish Pairs Speedway Championship. The final was held on 22 June at Piła.

Pos	Team	Pts	Riders
1	Atlas Wrocław	25	Jacek Krzyżaniak 13, Sebastian Ułamek 1, Robert Sawina 11
2	Polonia Bydgoszcz	23	Tomasz Gollob 14, Piotr Protasiewicz 9
3	Włókniarz Częstochowa	21	Grzegorz Walasek 13, Artur Pietrzyk 8
4	Gorzów Wlkp.	17	Piotr Świst 9, Rafał Okoniewski 8
5	RKM Rybnik	14	Mariusz Węgrzyk 12, Dariusz Śledź 2
6	ZKŻ Zielona Góra	13	Andrzej Huszcza 11, Maciej Kuciapa 2, Rafał Kurmański 0
7	Polonia Piła	13	Jacek Gollob 4, Sławomir Drabik 9, Tomasz Gapiński 0

== Team ==
=== Team Speedway Polish Championship ===
The 2001 Team Speedway Polish Championship was the 2001 edition of the Team Polish Championship. Apator Toruń won the gold medal.

==== Ekstraliga ====
First round

Pos	Club	Pld	W	D	L	Pts	+/-
1	Apator-Adriana Toruń	14	11	0	3	22	+170
2	Atlas Wrocław	14	9	1	4	19	+152
3	Pergo Gorzów Wlkp.	14	7	1	6	15	+61
4	Polonia Bydgoszcz	14	7	0	7	14	+51
5	BGŻ S.A.-Polonia Piła	14	6	0	8	12	-71
6	Unia Leszno	14	5	0	9	10	-118
7	Radson-Malma Włókniarz Częstochowa	14	4	2	8	10	-106
8	ZKŻ Polmos Zielona Góra	14	5	0	9	10	-142

Into Upper Group
Into Lower Group

Results

The home team is listed in the left-hand column.
	BYD	CZE	GOR	LES	PIŁ	TOR	WRO	ZIE
Bractwo-Polonia Bydgoszcz	x	61:29	46:44	42:48	51:39	43:47	47:43	54:36
Radson-Malma Włókniarz Częstochowa	49:41	x	45:45	57:33	52:38	41:48	32:58	48:42
Pergo Gorzów Wlkp.	52:38	52:38	x	49:40	41:49	51:39	41:49	57:33
Unia Leszno	35:55	53:37	49:41	x	48:42	32:58	44:46	64:26
BGŻ S.A.-Polonia Piła	35:55	56:34	34:56	57:33	x	33:57	46:44	54:36
Apator-Adriana Toruń	48:42	64:26	57:33	57:30	60:30	x	51:39	55:35
Atlas Wrocław	54:36	45:45	49:41	66:24	57:30	58:32	x	55:35
ZKŻ Polmos Zielona Góra	46:44	46:44	33:57	45:27	40:50	50:40	47:43	x

Final round

Upper Group

Pos	Club	Pld	W	D	L	Pts	1st R	Total	+/-
1	Apator Toruń	6	3	0	3	6	22	28	+10
2	Atlas Wrocław	6	4	0	2	8	19	27	+24
3	Polonia Bydgoszcz	6	3	0	3	6	14	20	-24
4	Gorzów Wlkp.	6	2	0	4	4	15	19	-12

The home team is listed in the left-hand column.
	BYD	GOR	TOR	WRO
Polonia Bydgoszcz	x	46:44	47:43	48:42
Pergo Gorzów Wlkp.	50:40	x	53:37	41:49
Apator-Netia Toruń	54:36	50:40	x	48:42
Atlas Wrocław	40:32	54:36	47:43	x

Lower Group

Pos	Club	Pld	W	D	L	Pts	1st R	Total
5	Polonia Piła	6	4	0	2	8	12	20
6	Włókniarz Częstochowa	6	3	0	3	6	10	16
7	Unia Leszno	6	3	0	3	6	10	16
8	ZKŻ Zielona Góra	6	2	0	4	4	10	14

The home team is listed in the left-hand column.
	CZE	GDA	LES	WRO
Radson-Malma Włókniarz Częstochowa	x	47:43	42:47	52:38
Lotos-Wybrzeże Gdańsk	42:48	x	52:38	55:35
Unia Leszno	47:43	49:41	x	44:46
Atlas Wrocław	58:32	51:39	51:32	x

==== 1.Liga ====
Pos	Team	P	W	D	L	Pts	Diff
1	Wybrzeże Gdańsk	20	17	0	3	313	34
2	RKM Rybnik	20	17	0	3	327	34
3	Stal Rzeszów	20	8	0	12	-2	16
4	Start Gniezno	20	7	0	13	-189	14
5	Kolejarz Rawicz	20	9	0	11	-46	18
6	GKM Grudziądz	20	9	0	11	-43	18
7	TŻ Opole	20	7	1	12	-210	15
8	ŁTŻ Łódź	20	5	1	14	-150	11

==== 2.Liga ====
Pos	Team	P	W	D	L	Pts	Diff
1	TŻ Kraków - Unia Tarnów	12	10	0	2	176	20
2	Ostrów Wielkopolski	12	9	0	3	153	18
3	ŻKS Krosno	12	8	0	4	73	16
4	Śląsk Świętochłowice	12	6	1	5	25	13
5	WTŻ Warszawa	12	4	1	7	–65	9
6	TŻ Lublin	12	3	1	8	–118	7
7	Wanda Kraków	12	0	1	11	–244	1

==== Promotion/relegation play offs ====
- RKM Rybnik v Unia Leszno 49:40, 38:52
- Ostrów v Opole 40:50, 44:46
