= 2000 Polish speedway season =

Motorcycle racing competition

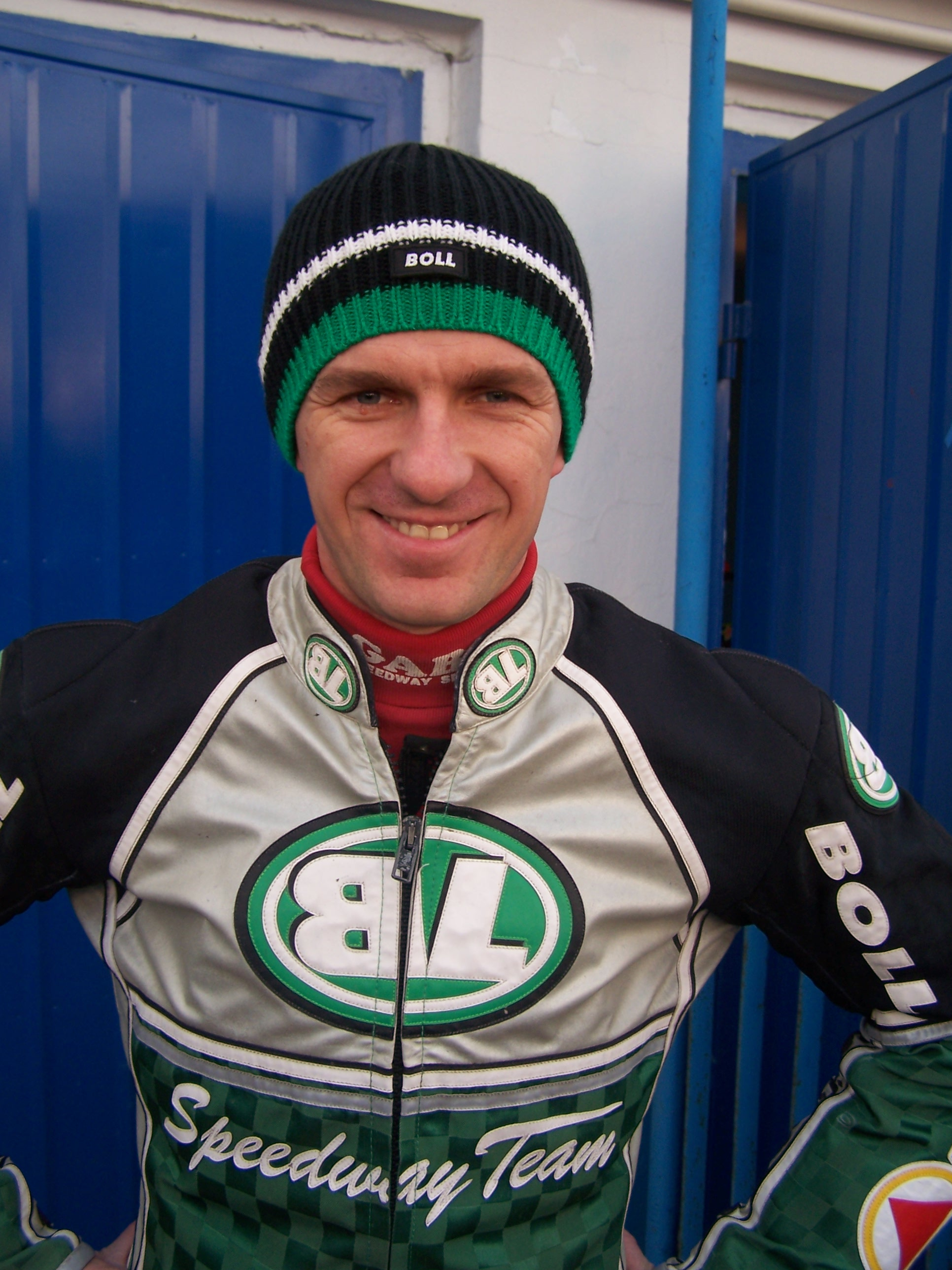
- Rafał Okoniewski, 2000 Polish junior champion

The 2000 Polish Speedway season was the 2000 season of motorcycle speedway in Poland.

== Individual ==
=== Polish Individual Speedway Championship ===
The 2000 Individual Speedway Polish Championship final was held on 15 August at Piła.

Pos.	Rider	Club	Total	Points
1	Jacek Gollob	Piła	12	(3,3,3,3)
2	Jarosław Hampel	Piła	9	(3,3,u,3)
3	Jacek Krzyżaniak	Wrocław	9	(3,2,3,1)
4	Adam Fajfer	Gdańsk	9	(2,3,2,2)
5	Andrzej Huszcza	Zielona Góra	8	(3,3,1,1)
6	Sławomir Drabik	Częstochowa	8	(1,2,2,3)
7	Sebastian Ułamek	Gdańsk	7	(2,1,2,2)
8	Robert Kościecha	Toruń	6	(2,1,3,u)
9	Piotr Świst	Gorzów Wlkp.	6	(1,2,2,1)
10	Damian Baliński	Leszno	5	(u,2,3,d)
11	Jacek Rempała	Leszno	5	(1,1,1,2)
12	Grzegorz Rempała	Rzeszów	4	(0,1,d,3)
13	Maciej Kuciapa	Rzeszów	3	(0,d,1,2)
14	Piotr Protasiewicz	Bydgoszcz	2	(2,d,–,–)
15	Wiesław Jaguś	Toruń	2	(1,0,1,0)
16	Tomasz Gapiński (res)	Piła	1	(1)
17	Grzegorz Walasek	Częstochowa	0	(0,d,0,–)
18	Przemysław Tajchert (res)	Bydgoszcz	0	(0,0)

=== Golden Helmet ===
The 2000 Golden Golden Helmet (Polish: Turniej o Złoty Kask, ZK) organised by the Polish Motor Union (PZM) was the 2000 event for the league's leading riders. The final was held at Wrocław on 29 September.

Pos.	Rider	Club	Total	Points
1	Tomasz Gollob	Bydgoszcz	14	(3,3,3,3,2)
2	Sebastian Ułamek	Gdańsk	13	(2,3,2,3,3)
3	Andrzej Huszcza	Zielona Góra	12	(1,3,3,3,2)
4	Robert Sawina	Wrocław	10	(3,3,0,3,1)
5	Piotr Świst	Gorzów Wlkp.	8	(0,0,3,2,3)
6	Wiesław Jaguś	Toruń	8	(1,2,3,1,1)
7	Piotr Protasiewicz	Bydgoszcz	8	(1,1,2,2,2)
8	Krzysztof Jabłoński	Gniezno	7	(3,0,2,2,0)
9	Robert Wardzała	Tarnów	7	(2,1,1,1,2)
10	Rafał Dobrucki	Piła	6	(2,w,1,0,3)
11	Grzegorz Rempała	Rzeszów	5	(0,d,2,0,3)
12	Maciej Kuciapa	Rzeszów	5	(3,2,d,d,d)
13	Jacek Gollob	Piła	4	(0,2,0,2,d)
14	Piotr Dym	Rawicz	4	(2,1,0,1,0)
15	Sławomir Drabik	Częstochowa	4	(d,2,1,0,1)
16	Rafał Okoniewski	Gorzów Wlkp.	4	(d,1,1,1,1)
17	Mariusz Węgrzyk (res)	Wrocław	ns	
18	Grzegorz Walasek (res)	Częstochowa	ns	

=== Junior Championship ===
- winner - Rafał Okoniewski

=== Silver Helmet ===
- winner - Jarosław Hampel

=== Bronze Helmet ===
- winner - Rafał Chromik

== Pairs ==
=== Polish Pairs Speedway Championship ===
The 2000 Polish Pairs Speedway Championship was the 2000 edition of the Polish Pairs Speedway Championship. The final was held on 8 September at Wrocław.

Pos	Team	Pts	Riders
1	Polonia Bydgoszcz	29	Tomasz Gollob 18, Piotr Protasiewicz 11
2	Wybrzeże Gdańsk	23	Sebastian Ułamek 17, Krzysztof Cegielski 6
3	Włókniarz Częstochowa	19	Sławomir Drabik 12, Mariusz Staszewski 7
4	Apator Toruń	18	Wiesław Jaguś 13, Mirosław Kowalik 0, Robert Kościecha 5
5	Stal Rzeszów	16	Maciej Kuciapa 5, Grzegorz Rempała 11
6	ŁTŻ Łódź	11	Marek Hućko 1, Jarosław Łukaszewski 8, Robert Kużdżał 2
7	Grudziądz	10	Robert Dados 2, Piotr Markuszewski 4, Tomasz Piszcz 4

== Team ==
=== Team Speedway Polish Championship ===
The 2000 Team Speedway Polish Championship was the 2000 edition of the Team Polish Championship. Polonia Bydgoszcz won the gold medal.

==== Ekstraliga ====
First round

Pos	Club	Pld	W	D	L	Pts	+/-
1	Polonia Bydgoszcz	14	10	1	3	21	+95
2	Ludwik-Polonia Piła	14	7	3	4	17	+14
3	Apator-Netia Toruń	14	6	1	7	13	-20
4	Pergo Gorzów Wlkp.	14	6	1	7	13	+10
5	Włókniarz Częstochowa	14	6	1	7	13	+2
6	Unia Leszno	14	6	0	8	12	-62
7	Lotos-Wybrzeże Gdańsk	14	6	0	8	12	-25
8	Atlas Wrocław	14	4	3	7	11	-14

Into Upper Group
Into Lower Group

Results

The home team is listed in the left-hand column.
	BYD	CZE	GDA	GOR	LES	PIŁ	TOR	WRO
Polonia Bydgoszcz	x	47:43	49:41	56:34	55:35	50:40	48:42	62:29
Radson-Malma Włókniarz Częstochowa	52:38	x	48:42	47:43	54:36	42:47	44:45	50:40
Lotos-Wybrzeże Gdańsk	39:51	57:29	x	42:47	45:44	53:35	30:24	46:44
Pergo Gorzów Wlkp.	42:48	48:42	49:41	x	51:39	42:48	58:32	48:42
Unia Leszno	43:47	44:42	47:43	46:42	x	43:47	47:43	48:42
Ludwik-Polonia Piła	49:40	40:50	50:40	45:45	49:40	x	51:39	43:46
Apator-Netia Toruń	49:41	52:38	44:45	48:42	53:37	45:45	x	47:43
Atlas Wrocław	45:45	45:45	59:31	47:42	44:46	45:45	52:38	x

Final round

Upper Group

Pos	Club	Pld	W	D	L	Pts	1st R	Total	+/-
1	Polonia Bydgoszcz	6	4	0	2	8	21	29	+16
2	Polonia Piła	6	4	1	1	9	17	26	+21
3	Gorzów Wlkp.	6	3	0	3	6	13	19	+28
4	Apator Toruń	6	0	1	5	1	13	14	-65

The home team is listed in the left-hand column.
	BYD	GOR	PIŁ	TOR
Polonia Bydgoszcz	x	50:40	55:35	46:44
Gorzów Wlkp.	51:39	x	44:46	59:31
Polonia Piła	52:38	49:40	x	53:37
Apator Toruń	40:50	44:45	45:45	x

Lower Group

Pos	Club	Pld	W	D	L	Pts	1st R	Total	+/-
5	Atlas Wrocław	6	4	0	2	8	11	19	+25
6	Włókniarz Częstochowa	6	3	0	3	6	13	19	+15
7	Unia Leszno	6	3	0	3	6	12	18	+1
8	Wybrzeże Gdańsk	6	2	0	4	4	12	16	-36

The home team is listed in the left-hand column.
	CZE	GDA	LES	WRO
Włókniarz Częstochowa	x	47:43	42:47	52:38
Wybrzeże Gdańsk	42:48	x	52:38	55:35
Unia Leszno	47:43	49:41	x	44:46
Atlas Wrocław	58:32	51:39	51:32	x

==== 1.Liga ====
Pos	Team	P	W	D	L	Pts	Diff
1	ZKŻ Zielona Góra	20	14	0	6	123	28
2	GKM Grudziądz	20	12	1	7	84	25
3	RKM Rybnik	20	11	0	9	6	22
4	Stal Rzeszów	20	9	1	10	60	19
5	Start Gniezno	20	9	2	9	26	20
6	Kolejarz Opole	20	9	0	11	-51	18
7	ŁTŻ Łódź	20	8	0	12	-166	16
8	Ostrów Wielkopolski	20	5	2	13	-82	12

==== 2.Liga ====
Pos	Team	P	W	D	L	Pts	Diff
1	Kolejarz Rawicz	12	10	0	2	163	20
2	Unia Tarnów	12	10	0	2	202	20
3	ŻKS Krosno	12	8	0	4	123	16
4	WSŻ Gwardia Warszawa	12	5	0	7	–78	10
5	Śląsk Świętochłowice	12	5	0	7	–13	10
6	LKŻ Lublin	12	3	0	9	–118	6
7	Wanda Kraków	12	1	0	11	–279	2

==== Promotion/relegation play offs ====
- Grudziądz - Leszno 38-52 30:60
- Tarnów - Łódź 37:53 31:58
