= 1999 Speedway Grand Prix =

5th season of the Speedway Grand Prix

Season details
- Dates: May 8 – September 25
- Events: 6
- Cities: 6
- Countries: 5
- Riders: 22 permanents 2 wild card(s)
- Heats: 144 (in 6 events)

Winners
- Champion: SWE Tony Rickardsson
- Runner-up: POL Tomasz Gollob
- 3rd place: DEN Hans Nielsen

The 1999 Speedway Grand Prix was the 54th edition of the official World Championship to determine the world champion rider. It was the fifth season in the Speedway Grand Prix era and was used to determine the Speedway World Champion.

== Event format ==
The system first used in 1998 continued to be adopted with 24 riders, divided into two classes. The eight best would be directly qualified for the "Main Event", while the sixteen others would be knocked out if they finished out of the top two in 4-man heats on two occasions – while they would go through if they finished inside the top two on two occasions. This resulted in 10 heats, where eight proceeded to the Main Event, where exactly the same system was applied to give eight riders to a semi-final.

The semi-finals were then two heats of four, where the top two qualified for a final and the last two going towards the consolation final. The 4 finalists scored 25, 20, 18 and 16 points, with 5th to 8th scoring 15, 14, 12 and 10 point, and after that 8, 8, 7, 7, etc. Places after 8th place were awarded according to the time a rider was knocked out and, secondly, according to position in the last heat he rode in.

== Qualification for Grand Prix ==
The 1999 season had 22 permanent riders and two wild cards at each event. The permanent riders are highlighted in the results table below.

== Calendar ==
Round	Date	City and venue	Winner	Runner-up	3rd placed	4th placed	Results
1	May 8	(Czech Republic) Prague , Czech Republic; Markéta Stadium	(Poland) Tomasz Gollob	(United States) Greg Hancock	(Australia) Jason Crump	(Sweden) Jimmy Nilsen	results
2	June 4	(Sweden) Linköping , Sweden; Motorstadium	(United Kingdom) Mark Loram	(Sweden) Jimmy Nilsen	(Sweden) Tony Rickardsson	(Australia) Leigh Adams	results
3	July 3	(Poland) Wrocław , Poland; Olympic Stadium	(Poland) Tomasz Gollob	(Sweden) Jimmy Nilsen	(Sweden) Stefan Dannö	(Sweden) Tony Rickardsson	results
4	July 31	(United Kingdom) Coventry , Great Britain; Brandon Stadium	(Sweden) Tony Rickardsson	(United Kingdom) Chris Louis	(United States) Greg Hancock	(Denmark) Hans Nielsen	results
5	August 28	Bydgoszcz , Poland; Polonia Stadium	(Denmark) Hans Nielsen	(Sweden) Tony Rickardsson	(Australia) Ryan Sullivan	(United Kingdom) Mark Loram	results
6	September 25	(Denmark) Vojens , Denmark; Speedway Center	(Sweden) Tony Rickardsson	(United Kingdom) Mark Loram	(Denmark) Hans Nielsen	(United Kingdom) Joe Screen	results

== Final standings ==
Qualifies for next season's Grand Prix series
Full-time Grand Prix rider
Wild card, track reserve or qualified reserve

Pos.	Rider	Points	CZE (Czech Republic)	SWE (Sweden)	POL (Poland)	GBR (United Kingdom)	PL2 (Poland)	DEN (Denmark)
Gold	(Sweden) (1) Tony Rickardsson	111	7	18	16	25	20	25
Silver	(Poland) (3) Tomasz Gollob	98	25	15	25	10	15	8
Bronze	(Denmark) (4) Hans Nielsen	76	6	1	10	16	25	18
4	(Sweden) (2) Jimmy Nilsen	73	16	20	20	8	4	5
5	(United Kingdom) (23)(25) Mark Loram	71	–	25	2	8	16	20
6	(United Kingdom) (19) Joe Screen	68	12	5	15	12	8	16
7	(Australia) (13) Leigh Adams	67	4	16	5	14	14	14
8	(Australia) (8) Jason Crump	66	18	7	12	15	8	6
9	(United States) (6) Greg Hancock	62	20	7	4	18	7	6
10	(Australia) (7) Ryan Sullivan	55	6	3	14	7	18	7
11	(Sweden) (17) Stefan Dannö	52	10	12	18	5	5	2
12	(United Kingdom) (5) Chris Louis	50	8	6	5	20	7	4
13	(Sweden) (10) Peter Karlsson	45	8	14	6	4	5	8
14	(Sweden) (18) Mikael Karlsson	45	7	5	8	7	6	12
15	(Czech Republic) (11) Antonín Kasper Jr.	39	15	10	7	3	2	2
16	(Denmark) (9) Brian Karger	36	3	8	6	6	3	10
17	(Sweden) (15) Henrik Gustafsson	35	5	2	7	4	10	7
18	(United States) (22) Billy Hamill	35	2	3	3	6	6	15
19	(Denmark) (20) John Jørgensen	32	14	8	3	2	1	4
20	(United Kingdom) (16) Andy Smith	22	5	6	1	5	4	1
21	(Poland) (21) Robert Dados	20	4	4	4	1	2	5
22	(Denmark) (14) Brian Andersen	12	3	1	2	2	3	1
23	(Poland) (23) Jacek Gollob	12	–	–	–	–	12	–
24	(Czech Republic) (12) Marián Jirout	8	1	2	1	1	–	3
25	(Poland) (24) Rafał Dobrucki	8	–	–	8	–	–	–
26	(Poland) (24) Sebastian Ułamek	4	–	4	–	–	–	–
27	(United Kingdom) (24) Scott Nicholls	3	–	–	–	3	–	–
28	(Denmark) (24) Jesper B. Jensen	3	–	–	–	–	–	3
29	(Czech Republic) (23) Antonín Šváb Jr.	2	2	–	–	–	–	–
30	(Poland) (24) Piotr Protasiewicz	2	1	–	–	–	1	–
Pos.	Rider	Points	CZE (Czech Republic)	SWE (Sweden)	POL (Poland)	GBR (United Kingdom)	PL2 (Poland)	DEN (Denmark)
