= Uhre =

Uhre is a Danish surname. Notable people with the surname include:

- Lars Uhre (born 1972), Danish badminton player and coach
- Maria Uhre Nielsen (born 1999), Danish football player
- Mikael Uhre (born 1994), Danish football player
- Nicole Uhre-Balk, American educator and politician
