= Marián Jirout =

Czech speedway rider (born 1976)

Marian Jirout
- Born: 21 July 1976 (age 50); Pardubice, Czechoslovakia
- Nationality: Czech

Career history

Poland
- 1998, 2000–2001: Tarnów
- 1999: Rawicz
- 2006–2007: Miskolc

Great Britain
- 1995–1997, 1999, 2001: Peterborough
- 2002–2003: Somerset
- 2004: Newcastle
- 2007: Mildenhall

Marian Jirout (born 21 July 1976 in Pardubice, Czechoslovakia) is a former motorcycle speedway from the Czech Republic. He earned 5 international caps for the Czech Republic national speedway team.

== Career ==
Jirout first rode in the British leagues in 1995 for Peterborough Panthers.

Jirout rode in the 1999 Speedway Grand Prix. In Britain, he raced with the Peterborough Panthers for five seasons from 1995 to 2001.

Following a car accident in January 2003, Jirout was almost left paralysed. However, he recovered well enough to start riding again for Newcastle Diamonds during the 2004 season.

In October 2007, during the Zlatá přilba race in Pardubice, Jirout broke three vertebrae in a fall and decided to end career of rider.

== Family ==
Jirout's father Jiří (1953–2000), also a speedway rider, won a silver medal in the 1979 Team Ice Racing World Championship.

== Results ==
=== Speedway Grand Prix ===
1999 Speedway Grand Prix Final Championship standings (Riding No 12)
Race no.	Grand Prix	Pos.	Pts.	Heats	Draw No
1 /6	(Czech Republic) Czech Rep. SGP	23	1	(0,0)	12
2 /6	(Sweden) Swedish SGP	21	2	(0,1)	22
3 /6	(Poland) Polish SGP	23	1	(1,0)	19
4 /6	(United Kingdom) British SGP	23	1	(n,n)	21
5 /6	(Poland) Polish II SGP	injury → (25) Mark Loram			22
6 /6	(Denmark) Danish SGP	19	3	(2,0,0)	22

permanent speedway rider
wild card, track reserve or qualified reserve
rider not classified (track reserve who did not start)

=== World Championships ===
- Team World Championship (Speedway World Team Cup and Speedway World Cup)
  - 1998 - (Denmark) Vojens - 5th place (5 points)
  - 2000 - 3rd place in Semi-Final A
  - 2001 - (Poland) - 7th place (4th place in Race-off)

=== European Championships ===
- European Club Champions' Cup
  - 2000 - (Poland) Piła - 4th place (3 points)
  - 2002 - (Czech Republic) Pardubice - Runner-up (6 points)

== See also ==
- Czech Republic national speedway team
- List of Speedway Grand Prix riders
