= Jacek Gollob =

Polish speedway rider

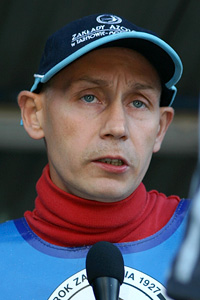
- Born: 27 October 1969 (age 57); Bydgoszcz, Poland
- Nationality: Polish

Career history

Poland
- 1989: Wybrzeże Gdańsk
- 1990-1998, 2002-2003, 2008, 2016: Polonia Bydgoszcz
- 1999-2001: Polonia Piła
- 2004-2007: Unia Tarnów

Sweden
- 2000-2002: Västervik

Individual honours
- 1998, 2000: Polish Champion
- 1996, 1998: Polish Golden Helmet Winner

Team honours
- 7 titles: Polish Pairs Champion
- 7 titles: Polish Team Champion

Jacek Gollob (born 27 October 1969 in Bydgoszcz, Poland) is a former motorcycle speedway rider from Poland.

== Career ==
Gollob twice won the individual Polish Championship (in 1998 and 2000), and has also won the team and pairs championships several times. For his sport achievements, he received the Golden Cross of Merit in 2000.

Gollob returned to ride for Polonia Bydgoszcz in 2016, as well as coaching the team at the same time.

== Family ==
Gollob's younger brother Tomasz is also a speedway rider.

== Speedway Grand Prix results ==
1998 Speedway Grand Prix Final Championship standings (Riding No 24)
Race no.	Grand Prix	Pos.	Pts.	Heats	Draw No
6 /6	(Poland) Polish SGP	18	4	(2,0,1)	24

1999 Speedway Grand Prix Final Championship standings (Riding No 23)
Race no.	Grand Prix	Pos.	Pts.	Heats	Draw No
5 /6	(Poland) Polish II SGP	7	12	(1,3,3) (2,0,2) +0 +1	23

permanent speedway rider
wild card, track reserve or qualified reserve
rider not classified (track reserve who did not start)

== Career ==
=== Speedway World Team Cup ===
- 1994 - Vice-World Champion (4 points)
- 1995 - 6th place (1 point)
- 1998 - 4th place (0 points)

=== European Club Champions' Cup ===
- 1998 - European Champion (6 points)

=== Individual Polish Championship ===
- 1991 - 13th place
- 1995 - 8th place
- 1996 - 14th place
- 1997 - 5th place
- 1998 - Polish Champion
- 1999 - 4th place
- 2000 - Polish Champion
- 2001 - 12th place
- 2005 - 3rd place

=== Polish Pairs Championship ===
- 1992 - 2nd place
- 1993 - Polish Champion
- 1994 - Polish Champion
- 1995 - Polish Champion
- 1996 - Polish Champion
- 1997 - Polish Champion
- 1998 - 2nd place
- 2001 - 7th place
- 2002 - Polish Champion
- 2003 - 4th place

=== Team Polish Championship ===
- 1992 - Polish Champion
- 1993 - Vice-Polish Champion
- 1995 - 3rd place
- 1997 - Polish Champion
- 1998 - Polish Champion
- 1999 - Polish Champion
- 2000 - Vice-Polish Champion
- 2002 - Polish Champion
- 2003 - 3rd place
- 2004 - Polish Champion
- 2005 - Polish Champion

=== Golden Helmet ===
- 1996 - Winner
- 1998 - Winner
- 2002 - 2nd place

== See also ==
- List of Speedway Grand Prix riders
