= John Jørgensen =

Danish speedway rider

- Born: 18 July 1962 (age 64); Middelfart, Denmark
- Nationality: Danish

Career history

Denmark
- 1984–1988, 1990–1996: Fjelsted
- 1989: Holstebro
- 2000: Odense
- 2001, 2004: Holsted

Great Britain
- 1982–1983: Birmingham Brummies
- 1984–1995, 1997, 2000, 2004: Coventry Bees
- 1996, 1998: Swindon Robins
- 1999: Wolverhampton Wolves
- 2000: Belle Vue Aces
- 2001: Peterborough Panthers
- 2004: Somerset Rebels

Poland
- 1995: Grudziądz
- 1998: Gdańsk
- 1999: Gorzów
- 2000: Ostrów

Sweden
- 1998–2003: Vetlanda
- 2000: Örnarna

Individual honours
- 1998: Nordic Champion

Team honours
- 1986, 1988: World Team Cup Winner
- 1987: British League Champion
- 1985, 1987: British League Cup Winner
- 2002: Allsvenskan Champion

John Jørgensen (born 18 July 1962 in Middelfart, Denmark) is a former international motorcycle speedway rider from Denmark. He earned 54 caps for the Denmark national speedway team.

He is not to be confused with Johnny Jørgensen, the 1989 Danish Junior speedway champion.

== Career ==
Jørgensen arrived to race in the British leagues late in the 1982 British League season after Chris Van Straaten signed him to ride for the Birmingham Brummies. After two solid seasons, Birmingham withdrew from the league and Jorgensen was signed by Coventry Bees, where he would spend most of his career.

In 1986, Jørgensen averaged 8.74 for Coventry and became part of the Danish national team during their period of domination during the 1980s and won the World Team Cup with Denmark in 1986 and 1988, riding alongside some of the world's best riders at the time Hans Nielsen, Erik Gundersen, Tommy Knudsen and his cousin Jan O. Pedersen. Jørgensen also qualified for the World Final on two occasions, 1988 in Vojens and 1992 in Wrocław.

Jørgensen also rode in the 1999 and 2000 Speedway Grand Prix.

== Family ==
Jørgensen's cousin was world champion rider Jan O. Pedersen.

== World Final appearances ==
=== Individual World Championship ===
- 1988 - (Denmark) Vojens, Speedway Center - 13th - 3pts
- 1992 - (Poland) Wrocław, Olympic Stadium - 6th - 8pts

=== World Team Cup ===
- 1986 - (Sweden) Gothenburg, Ullevi, (Denmark) Vojens, Speedway Center and (England) Bradford, Odsal Stadium (with Erik Gundersen / Hans Nielsen / Tommy Knudsen / Jan O. Pedersen) - Winner - 130pts (8)
- 1988 - (United States) Los Angeles, Veterans Memorial Stadium (with Erik Gundersen / Hans Nielsen / Tommy Knudsen / Jan O. Pedersen) - Winner - 44pts (2)
- 1989 - (England) Bradford, Odsal Stadium (with Hans Nielsen / Erik Gundersen / Gert Handberg / Brian Karger) - 2nd - 34pts (7)
- 1990 - (Czechoslovakia) Pardubice - 3rd - 30pts (4)
- 1992 - (Italy) Lonigo - 4th - 17pts (1)
- 1993 - (England) Coventry - 2nd - 38pts (8)

=== Speedway Grand Prix ===
| Year | Position | Points | Best finish | Notes |
|---|---|---|---|---|
| 1999 | 17th | 32 | 6th | Best finish in Czech Republic GP |
| 2000 | 34th | 1 | 24th | Competed only in British GP |

== World Under-21 Championship ==
- 1982 - (West Germany) Pocking - 8th - 9pts
- 1983 - (Italy) Lonigo - 9th - 10pts

== Danish Domestic competitions ==
Danish Championship

- 1992 - (Denmark) Uhre, Holsted - 3rd
- 1995 - (Denmark) Frederikslyst - 3rd
- 1998 - (Denmark) Outrup - 2nd
- 2000 - (Denmark) Outrup - 3rd

== See also ==
- List of Speedway Grand Prix riders
- Denmark national speedway team
