= Jacek Rempała =

Polish speedway rider

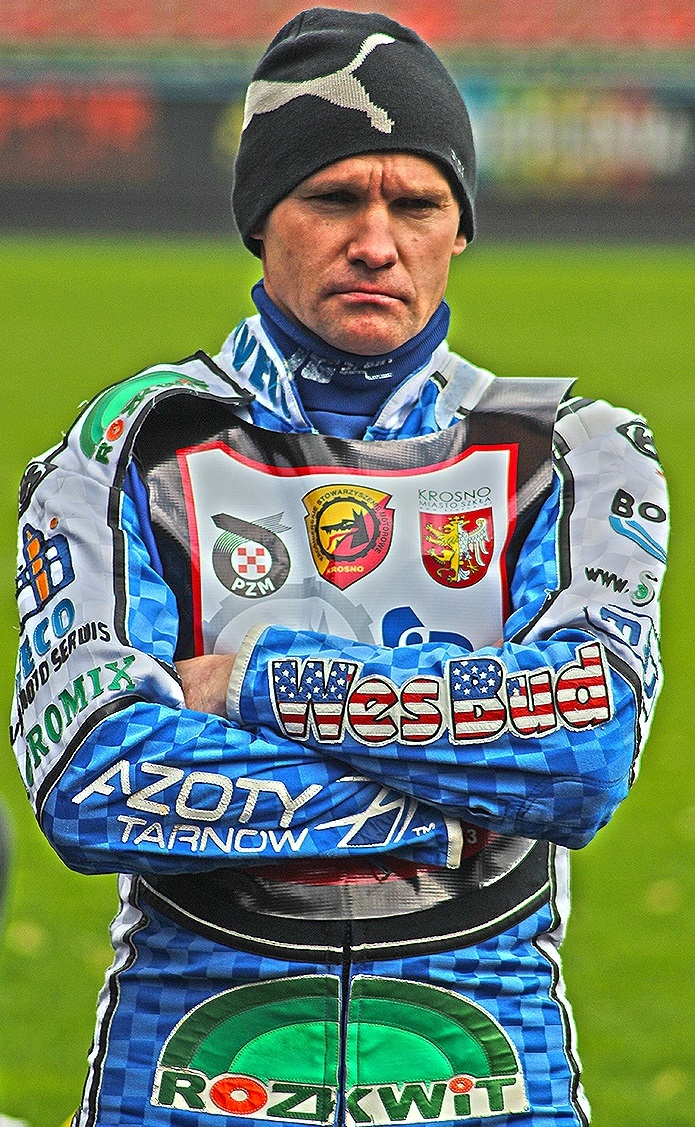
- Born: 16 February 1971 (age 55); Tarnów, Poland
- Nationality: Polish

Career history

Poland
- 1988–1997 2007–2008: Unia Tarnów
- 1998–1999: GKM Grudziądz
- 2000–2005: Unia Leszno
- 2006, 2009, 2013: Motor Lublin
- 2010–2011: Orzeł Łódź
- 2012: ROW Rybnik
- 2014: KM Krosno

Great Britain
- 1992: Ipswich Witches
- 2006–2007: Berwick Bandits
- 2006: Coventry Bees

Denmark
- 2002: Holsted
- 2003–2005: Brovst

Sweden
- 2003: Bysarna

Individual honours
- 1989: Poland Bronze Helmet Winner

Jacek Rempała (born 16 February 1971) is a former motorcycle speedway rider from Poland. He earned eight caps for the Poland national speedway team.

== Career ==
Rempała represented Poland during the 1991 Speedway World Team Cup.

Rempała rode in Poland for 27 years and spent much of it with Unia Tarnów. He won the 1991 Silver Helmet and the 1993 Bronze Helmet.

Rempała first rode in Britain when he signed for the Ipswich Witches for the 1992 British League season. He did not return to Britain again until 2006, when he joined the Berwick Bandits.

== Family ==
Rempała's brothers, Marcin, Grzegorz and Tomasz were also speedway riders. His son Krystian was tragically killed in a speedway accident while riding in Poland during 2016.

== Major results ==
=== World Cup ===
- 1992 - 2nd place in Group C
