= Antonín Šváb Jr. =

Czech speedway rider

- Born: 9 June 1974 (age 52); Vlašim, Czechoslovakia
- Nationality: Czech

Career history

Great Britain
- 1994–1995, 2005: Exeter Falcons
- 1996: Middlesbrough Bears
- 1998–2000: Ipswich Witches
- 2001–2002: Eastbourne Eagles
- 2004: Belle Vue Aces

Poland
- 1997: Rybnik
- 1999–2003: Zielona Góra

Sweden
- 2000–2001: Bysarna
- 2000, 2003: Indianerna
- 2002: Västervik

Individual honours
- 2001: Argentinian Champion

Team honours
- 1999 - Runner-up: World Team Cup
- 1998 - Runner-up: European Club Champions' Cup
- 2000: Allsvenskan Winner

Antonín "Toni" Šváb Jr. (born 9 June 1974) is a Czech former motorcycle speedway rider. He earned four international caps for the Czech Republic national speedway team.

== Career ==
Šváb first rode in the British leagues in 1994 after signing for Exeter Falcons. Later in 1996, he rode for Middlesbrough Bears.

Šváb won a silver medal in the 1999 Speedway World Team Cup for the Czech Republic. He has entered in three Individual Under-21 World Championship finals (1993–1995) and has started in the Speedway Grand Prix and the Speedway World Cup.

In 2001, Šváb won the Argentine Championship.

On 8 January 2006, Šváb suffered very serious accident during a race in Argentina. He spent a month in a coma on life support and after recovery remained partially paralyzed on his left side, his short-term memory was damaged and eventually was given partial invalid retirement. In the middle of 2008, reflecting worsened health situation, Šváb decided to end his sport activities.

== Family ==
Šváb's father, Antonín Šváb Sr., also a speedway rider, was the winner of the Individual Ice Racing World Champion title in 1970.

== Career details ==
=== World Championships ===
- Individual Speedway World Championship and Speedway Grand Prix
  - 1999 - 29th place (2 pts in one event)
  - 2004 - 40th place (2 pts in one event)
- Team World Championship (Speedway World Team Cup and Speedway World Cup)
  - 1993 - 4th place in Group A
  - 1999 - (Czech Republic) Pardubice - Runner-up (0 pts)
  - 2000 - 3rd place in Semi Final
  - 2003 - (Denmark) - 6th place (4 pts in Race-off)
- Individual U-21 World Championship
  - 1993 - (Czech Republic) Pardubice - 9th place (7 pts)
  - 1994 - (Norway) Elgane - 10th place (5 pts)
  - 1995 - (Finland) Tampere - 12th place (4 pts)

=== European Championships ===
- Individual European Championship
  - 2003 - (Czech Republic) Slaný - 11th place (6 pts)
- European Club Champions' Cup
  - 1998 - (Poland) Bydgoszcz - Runner-up (11 pts) for PSK Olymp Prague
  - 1999 - (Germany) Diedenbergen - 4th place (6 pts) for PSK Olymp Prague

== See also ==
- List of Speedway Grand Prix riders
- Czech Republic national speedway team
