= 1954 Polish speedway season =

Motorcycle racing competition

The 1954 Polish Speedway season was the 1954 season of motorcycle speedway in Poland.

== Individual ==
=== Polish Individual Speedway Championship ===
The 1954 Individual Speedway Polish Championship was held over five legs.

- Wrocław, 30 May
- Katowice, 20 June
- Leszno, 8 August
- Bydgoszcz, 3 October
- Warsawa, 17 October

Pos.	Rider	Club	Total	Points
1	Mieczysław Połukard	Wrocław	33	(x,12,2,9,12)
2	Janusz Suchecki	Warszawa	29	(9,5.5,10,9,10)
3	Edward Kupczyński	Wrocław	27	(9,8,8,10,6)
4	Włodzimierz Szwendrowski	Łódź	27	(x, 7,10,0,10)
5	Andrzej Krzesiński	Leszno	25	(8,6,1,1,6)
6	Eugeniusz Nazimek	Bydgoszcz	25	(9,4,8,8,7)
7	Józef Olejniczak	Leszno	23	(10,x,6,7,x)
8	Zbigniew Raniszewski	Bydgoszcz	23	(5,8,6,9,5)
9	Marian Kaznowski	Częstochowa	15	(x,2,4,6,5)
10	Florian Kapała	Rawicz	15	(x,6,1,x,8)
11	Alojzy Frach	Wrocław	14	(6,1,4,4,1)
12	Tadeusz Fijałkowski	Warszawa	13	(5,x,2,1,6)
13	Bernard Kacperak	Częstochowa	9.5	(x,7.5,0,x,2)
14	Jan Krakowiak	Łódź	7	(x,x,x,7,0)
15	Józef Wieczorek	Rybnik	5	(5,0,x,x,0)
16	Norbert Świtała	Wrocław	5	(4,1,x,x,x)
17	Stanisław Glapiak	Leszno	4	(x,x,4,x,x)
18	Feliks Błajda	Bydgoszcz	3	(x,x,x,3,x)
19	Bolesław Bonin	Bydgoszcz	2	(x,x,x,2,x)
20	Antoni Kowalski	Bydgoszcz	2	(x,x,x,2,x)
21	Kazimierz Wiśniewski	Świętochłowice	2	(2,x,x,x,x)

=== Criterium of Aces ===
The Criterium of Aces was won by Edward Kupczyński.

== Team ==
=== Team Speedway Polish Championship ===
The 1954 Team Speedway Polish Championship was the seventh edition of the Team Polish Championship.

Rules

In First League, matches were played with part two teams, with it playing it matches return. Teams were made up of six drivers plus two reserves. The score of heat: 3–2–1–0. Mecz consisted of 9 heats. For winning a game a team received 2 points, draw – 1 point, loss – 0 points. The drivers from main squads started in match three times. The quantity of small points was added up.

==== First League ====
Pos	Team	Match	Points	Won	Draw	Lost	+/-
1	Unia Leszno	18	32	16	0	2	+195
2	Spójnia Wrocław	18	28	14	0	4	+208
3	Kolejarz Rawicz	18	26	13	0	5	+110
4	Gwardia Bydgoszcz	18	20	10	0	8	−20
5	Budowlani Warszawa	18	19	9	1	8	−19
6	CWKS Wrocław	18	18	9	0	9	−43
7	Górnik Rybnik	18	16	8	0	10	−43
8	Ogniwo Łódź	18	10	5	0	13	−74
9	Włókniarz Częstochowa	18	9	4	1	13	−26
10	Stal Świętochłowice	18	2	1	0	17	−288

Medalists

Unia Leszno	Andrzej Krzesiński, Józef Olejniczak, Stanisław Glapiak, Stanisław Kowalski, Mieczysław Cichocki, Zdzisław Smoczyk, Marian Kuśnierek, Andrzej Bartoszkiewicz, Henryk Zyto, Henryk Woźniak
Spójnia Wrocław	Mieczysław Połukard, Edward Kupczyński, Alojzy Frach, Mieczysław Kosierb, Jerzy Błoch, Jerzy Sałabun, Albin Tomczyszyn, Tadeusz Teodorowicz, Adolf Słaboń
Kolejarz Rawicz	Florian Kapała, Henryk Ignasiak, Marian Jankowski, Marian Spychała, Jan Siekalski, Wacław Wechmann, Franciszek Cieślawski
