= 1957 Polish speedway season =

Motorcycle racing competition

The 1957 Polish Speedway season was the 1957 season of motorcycle speedway in Poland.

== Individual ==
=== Polish Individual Speedway Championship ===
The 1957 Individual Speedway Polish Championship format changed from multiple legs to one-off final, held on 18 August at Rybnik.

Pos.	Rider	Club	Total	Points
1	Marian Kaiser	Warszawa	15	(3,3,3,3,3)
2	Joachim Maj	Rybnik	14	(3,2,3,3,3)
3	Edward Kupczyński	Wrocław	11	(1,3,2,2,3)
4	Stanisław Tkocz	Rybnik	11	(2,1,3,3,2)
5	Paweł Waloszek	Katowice	10	(3,1,3,2,1)
6	Tadeusz Teodorowicz	Wrocław	10	(1,3,1,2,3)
7	Marian Philipp	Rybnik	9	(3,2,0,2,2)
8	Mieczysław Połukard	Bydgoszcz	9	(2,2,3,1,1)
9	Konstanty Pociejkowicz	Wrocław	8	(1,3,2,d,2)
10	Józef Wieczorek	Rybnik	7	(2,2,1,2,0)
11	Jan Malinowski	Bydgoszcz	3	(0,0,2,1,0)
12	Paweł Mirowski	Łódź	3	(0,1,w,0,2)
13	Norbert Świtała	Bydgoszcz	3	(2,0,1)
14	Janusz Kościelak	Rzeszów	2	(0,0,1,0,1)
15	Henryk Żyto	Leszno	2	(1,1,0,0,d)
16	Rajmund Świtała	Bydgoszcz	1	(0,0,0,1,0)
17	Stanisław Rurarz (res)	Świętochłowice		(ns)
18	Kazimierz Bentke (res)	Ostrów Wlkp.		(1,1)

=== Criterium of Aces ===
The Criterium of Aces was won by Marian Kaiser.

== Team ==
=== Team Speedway Polish Championship ===
The 1957 Team Speedway Polish Championship was the tenth edition of the Team Polish Championship.

In First and Second League, matches were played with part two teams, with it playing it matches return. It made up the team six riders plus two reserve. The score of heat: 3-2-1-0. Mecz consisted with 13 heats. For winning game team received 2 points, draw - 1 point, lost - 0 points. The riders from main squad started in match four times. The quantity of small points was added up.

In Third League, matches were played with part two teams, with it playing it matches return. It made up the team six riders plus two reserve. The score of heat: 3-2-1-0. Mecz consisted with 9 heats. For winning game team received 2 points, draw - 1 point, lost - 0 points. The riders from main squad started in match three times. The quantity of small points was added up.

==== First League ====
Pos	Team	Match	Points	Won	Draw	Lost	+/-
1	Górnik Rybnik	14	28	14	0	0	+333
2	Sparta Wrocław	14	18	9	0	5	+119
3	Polonia Bydgoszcz	14	16	8	0	6	+62
4	Włókniarz Częstochowa	14	14	7	0	7	+67
5	Legia Warszawa	14	14	7	0	7	-10
6	Stal Świętochłowice	14	10	5	0	9	-161
7	Tramwajarz Łódź	14	6	3	0	11	-200
8	Kolejarz Rawicz	14	6	3	0	11	-210

Medalists

Górnik Rybnik	Joachim Maj, Marian Philip, Józef Wieczorek, Stanisław Tkocz, Zygmunt Kuchta, Bogdan Berliński, Stefan Lip, Erwin Maj
Sparta Wrocław	Edward Kupczyński, Tadeusz Teodorowicz, Konstanty Pociejkowicz
Polonia Bydgoszcz	Norbert Świtała, Andrzej Mielcarski, Zbigniew Sander, Jan Malinowski

==== Second League ====
Pos	Team	Match	Points	Won	Draw	Lost	+/-
1	Stal Rzeszów	12	22	11	0	1	+180
2	Unia Leszno	12	22	11	0	1	+173
3	Skra Warszawa	12	14	7	0	5	+41
4	Gwardia Katowice	12	8	4	0	8	-38
5	Stal Gorzów Wlkp.	12	8	4	0	8	-102
6	Ostrovia Ostrów Wlkp.	12	6	3	0	9	-114
7	LPŻ Lublin	12	4	2	0	10	-142

==== Third League ====
North Group

Pos	Team	Match	Points	Won	Draw	Lost	+/-
	Start Gniezno	8	12	6	0	2	+80
	Polonia Piła	8	10	5	0	3	+30
	Sparta Śrem	8	8	4	0	4	+35
	LPŻ Gdańsk	8	8	4	0	4	-63
	LPŻ Zielona Góra	8	2	1	0	7	-82
	Olimpia Poznań	DNQ					

South Group

Pos	Team	Match	Points	Won	Draw	Lost	+/-
1	AMK Kraków	8	12	6	0	2	+54
2	CWK Czeladź	8	12	6	0	2	+27
3	Unia Tarnów	8	8	4	0	4	-26
4	Legia Krosno	8	6	3	0	5	-39
5	Sparta Wrocław II	8	2	1	0	7	-56

After season, AMK Kraków was dissolved but two clubs were created: Cracovia Kraków and Wanda Nowa Huta.
