= 1956 Polish speedway season =

Motorcycle racing competition

The 1956 Polish Speedway season was the 1956 season of motorcycle speedway in Poland.

== Individual ==
=== Polish Individual Speedway Championship ===
The 1956 Individual Speedway Polish Championship was held over three legs.

- Rzeszów, 5 August
- Leszno, 19 August
- Bydgoszcz, 4 November

Pos.	Rider	Club	Total	Points
1	Florian Kapała	Rawicz	44	(14,15,15)
2	Edward Kupczyński	Wrocław	36	(13,12,11)
3	Stanislaw Tkocz	Rybnik	33	(11,13,9)
4	Mieczysław Połukard	Bydgoszcz	26	(10,2,14)
5	Jan Malinowski	Bydgoszcz	26	(7,11,8)
6	Tadeusz Teodorowicz	Wrocław	24	(5,7,12)
7	Joachim Maj	Rybnik	20	(9,11,0)
8	Eugeniusz Nazimek	Rzeszów	18	(9,9)
9	Marian Spychała	Rawicz	16	(2,4,9)
10	Henryk Żyto	Leszno	15	(2,2,11)
11	Rajmund Świtała	Bydgoszcz	15	(1,6,8)
12	Janusz Suchecki	Warszawa	15	(7,8)
13	Kazimierz Bentke	Ostrów Wlkp.	12	(7,5)
14	Jerzy Błoch	Wrocław	11	(3,2,6)
15	Józef Wieczorek	Rybnik	10	(10)
16	Marian Jankowski	Ostrów Wlkp.	8	(4,4)
17	Andrzej Krzesiński	Warszawa	7	(7)
18	Marian Mielcarski	Bydgoszcz	5	(5)
19	Zdzisław Jałowiecki	Częstochowa	1	(1)

=== Criterium of Aces ===
The Criterium of Aces was won by Florian Kapała.

== Team ==
=== Team Speedway Polish Championship ===
The 1956 Team Speedway Polish Championship was the ninth edition of the Team Polish Championship.

==== First League ====
In First League, matches were held with two teams, with it playing it matches return. Teams were made up of six drivers plus one reserve. The score of heat: 3-2-1-0. The matches consisted of 12 heats. For winning a game a team received 2 points, draw - 1 point, lost - 0 points. The drivers from main squad started in match four times. The quantity of small points was added up.

The 2 competing teams shall each consist of 7 drivers: 6 drivers having programmed drivers and the seventh driver being a substitute, as follows:

- Home Team (Helmet colour Red and Blue): No 9, 10, 11, 12, 13, 14 and 15,
- Away Team (Yellow and White): No 1, 2, 3, 4, 5, 6, and 7.

Table

Pos	Team	Match	Points	Won	Draw	Lost	+/-
1	Górnik Rybnik	14	24	12	0	2	?
2	Ślęza Wrocław	14	20	10	0	4	?
3	Gwardia Bydgoszcz	14	16	8	0	6	?
4	CWKS Warszawa	14	16	8	0	6	?
5	Kolejarz Rawicz	14	15	7	1	6	?
6	Tramwajarz Łódź	14	11	5	1	8	?
7	Unia Leszno	14	6	3	0	11	?
8	Budowlani Warszawa	14	4	2	0	12	?

Medalists

Górnik Rybnik	Joachim Maj, Stanisław Tkocz, Marian Philipp, Józef Wieczorek, Jan Błonkała, Bogdan Berliński, Paweł Dziura, Lucjan Siemek
Gwardia Bydgoszcz	Mieczysław Połukard, Jan Malinowski, Rajmund Świtała, Marian Mielcarski, Zbigniew Raniszewski, Andrzej Mielcarek, Zbigniew Sander, Witold Kamiński, Bolesław Bonin, Antoni Kowalski, Feliks Błajda
Ślęza Wrocław	Edward Kupczyński, Tadeusz Teodorowicz, Alojzy Frach, Jerzy Błoch, Konstanty Pociejkowicz, Zdzisław Biela, Horvath, Alojzy Frach, Mieczysław Kosierb, Roman Wielgosz, Tadeusz Chwilczyński, Adolf Słaboń

==== Second League ====
In Second League, matches were played with part two teams, with it playing it matches return. Teams were made up of six riders plus two reserve. The scoring of a heat: 3-2-1-0. Mecz consisted with 9 heats. For winning a game a team received 2 points, draw - 1 point, loss - 0 points. The riders from the main squad started in the match three times. The quantity of small points was added up.

North Group

Pos	Team	Match	Points	Won	Draw	Lost	+/-
1	Włókniarz Częstochowa	14	26	13	0	1	?
2	Stal Gorzów Wlkp.	14	23	11	1	2	?
3	AMK Katowice	14	15	7	1	6	?
4	Resovia Rzeszów	14	14	7	0	7	?
5	Sparta Śrem	14	13	6	1	7	?
6	Gwardia Poznań	14	12	6	0	8	?
7	Start Gniezno	14	7	3	1	10	?
8	Kolejarz Piła	14	2	1	0	13	?

South Group

Pos	Team	Match	Points	Won	Draw	Lost	+/-
	Stal Świętochłowice	14	25	12	1	1	?
	Ostrovia Ostrów Wlkp.	14	24	12	0	2	?
	Stal Rzeszów	14	22	11	0	3	?
	LPŻ Lublin	14	15	7	1	6	?
	Gwardia Katowice	14	12	6	0	8	?
	Górnik Czeladź	14	6	3	0	11	?
	Ślęza Wrocław II	14	5	2	1	11	?
	AMK Nowa Huta	14	3	1	1	12	?

Play-Offs Match was played in Ostrów Wlkp.

Date	Home		Away
4 Oct	Częstochowa	37:16	Gorzów Wlkp.
4 Oct	Świętochłowice	?	Ostrów Wlkp.
11 Oct	Częstochowa	35:19	Ostrów Wlkp.
11 Oct	Świętochłowice	wo.	Gorzów Wlkp.
