= 1958 Polish speedway season =

Motorcycle racing competition

The 1958 Polish Speedway season was the 1958 season of motorcycle speedway in Poland.

== Individual ==
=== Polish Individual Speedway Championship ===
The 1958 Individual Speedway Polish Championship was held on 31 August at Rybnik.

| Pos. | Rider | Club | Total | Points |
|---|---|---|---|---|
| 1 | Stanisław Tkocz | Rybnik | 15 | (3,3,3,3,3) |
| 2 | Edward Kupczyński | Wrocław | 14 | (3,3,3,2,3) |
| 3 | Joachim Maj | Rybnik | 13 | (3,2,3,3,2) |
| 4 | Konstanty Pociejkowicz | Wrocław | 12 | (2,1,3,3,3) |
| 5 | Mieczysław Połukard | Bydgoszcz | 10 | (3,2,2,1,2) |
| 6 | Marian Kaiser | Warszawa | 10 | (2,3,2,2,1) |
| 7 | Kazimierz Bentke | Ostrów Wlkp. | 9 | (1,3,2,3,0) |
| 8 | Jan Malinowski | Rzeszów | 7 | (2,0,1,2,2) |
| 9 | Bolesław Bonin | Bydgoszcz | 7 | (2,0,1,1,3) |
| 10 | Eugeniusz Wróżyński | Łódź | 5 | (1,1,2,0,1) |
| 11 | Stanisław Rurarz | Świętochłowice | 5 | (1,2,w,2,0) |
| 12 | Rajmund Świtała | Bydgoszcz | 4 | (u,2,0,0,2) |
| 13 | Norbert Świtała | Bydgoszcz | 4 | (1,1,1,0,1) |
| 14 | Bronisław Rogal | Warszawa | 2 | (0,1,0,w,1) |
| 15 | Jan Kusiak | Leszno | 2 | (0,0,1,1,0) |
| 16 | Zdzisław Jałowiecki | Częstochowa | 1 | (0,0,w,1,0) |
| 17 | Paweł Waloszek (res) | Świętochłowice | | (ns) |
| 18 | Janusz Kościelak (res) | Rzeszów | | (ns) |
| 19 | Zdzisław Waliński (res) | Leszno | | (ns) |

=== Criterium of Aces ===
The Criterium of Aces was won by Mieczysław Połukard.

== Team ==
=== Team Speedway Polish Championship ===
The 1958 Team Speedway Polish Championship was the 11th edition of the Team Polish Championship.

==== First League ====
| Pos | Team | Match | Points | Won | Draw | Lost | +/- |
|---|---|---|---|---|---|---|---|
| 1 | Górnik Rybnik | 14 | 23 | 11 | 1 | 2 | +212 |
| 2 | Sparta Wrocław | 14 | 18 | 9 | 0 | 5 | +59 |
| 3 | Unia Leszno | 14 | 16 | 8 | 0 | 6 | +125 |
| 4 | Włókniarz Częstochowa | 14 | 16 | 8 | 0 | 6 | +62 |
| 5 | Polonia Bydgoszcz | 14 | 14 | 6 | 2 | 6 | -16 |
| 6 | Legia Warszawa | 14 | 13 | 6 | 1 | 7 | -108 |
| 7 | Stal Rzeszów | 14 | 7 | 3 | 1 | 10 | -115 |
| 8 | Stal Świętochłowice | 14 | 5 | 2 | 1 | 11 | -219 |

Medalists

| Górnik Rybnik | Joachim Maj, Stanisław Tkocz, Marian Philipp, Józef Wieczorek, Bogdan Berliński, Stefan Lip, Erwin Maj, Karol Peszke |
| Sparta Wrocław | Konstanty Pociejkowicz, Edward Kupczyński, Tadeusz Teodorowicz, Alojzy Frach, Stanisław Skowron, Jerzy Błoch, Henryk Kałuża, Adolf Słaboń |
| Unia Leszno | Henryk Żyto, Jan Kusiak, Zdzisław Waliński, Andrzej Bartoszkiewicz, Ryszard Michalak, Stanisław Sochacki, Zbigniew Flegel, Leon Majewicz |

==== Second League ====
| Pos | Team | Match | Points | Won | Draw | Lost | +/- |
|---|---|---|---|---|---|---|---|
| 1 | Start Gniezno | 10 | 14 | 7 | 0 | 3 | +65 |
| 2 | Kolejarz Rawicz | 10 | 13 | 6 | 1 | 3 | +50 |
| 3 | Tramwajarz Łódź | 10 | 10 | 5 | 0 | 5 | +30 |
| 4 | Ostrovia Ostrów Wlkp. | 10 | 10 | 5 | 0 | 5 | -31 |
| 5 | Skra Warszawa | 10 | 7 | 3 | 1 | 6 | -24 |
| 6 | Stal Gorzów Wlkp. | 10 | 6 | 3 | 0 | 7 | -90 |
| | CWK Czeladź | DNQ | | | | | |
| | KKS Katowice | dissolved | | | | | |

Before season, KKS Katowice was dissolved.

==== Third League ====
| Pos | Team | Match | Points | Won | Draw | Lost | +/- |
|---|---|---|---|---|---|---|---|
| 1 | Unia Tarnów | 18 | 30 | 15 | 0 | 3 | +344 |
| 2 | Wanda Nowa Huta | 18 | 30 | 15 | 0 | 3 | +299 |
| 3 | Polonia Piła | 18 | 25 | 12 | 1 | 5 | +161 |
| 4 | LPŻ Lublin | 18 | 22 | 11 | 0 | 7 | +266 |
| 5 | Sparta Śrem | 18 | 19 | 9 | 1 | 8 | +101 |
| 6 | Legia Krosno | 18 | 18 | 9 | 0 | 9 | +41 |
| 7 | LPŻ Neptun Gdańsk | 18 | 16 | 8 | 0 | 10 | -86 |
| 8 | LPŻ Zielona Góra | 18 | 10 | 5 | 0 | 13 | -265 |
| 9 | Sparta Wrocław II | 18 | 4 | 2 | 0 | 16 | -384 |
| 10 | Cracovia Kraków | 18 | 2 | 1 | 0 | 17 | -477 |
