= 1955 Polish speedway season =

Motorcycle racing competition

The 1955 Polish Speedway season was the 1955 season of motorcycle speedway in Poland.

== Individual ==
=== Polish Individual Speedway Championship ===
The 1955 Individual Speedway Polish Championship was held over four legs.

- Rybnik, 26 May
- Leszno, 21 August
- Bydgoszcz, 30 October
- Wrocław, 6 November

Pos.	Rider	Club	Total	Points
1	Włodzimierz Szwendrowski	Łódź	42	(13,14,15)
2	Andrzej Krzesiński	Leszno	38	(15,11,12,8)
3	Zbigniew Raniszewski	Bydgoszcz	38	(13,6,13,12)
4	Edward Kupczyński	Wrocław	37	(9,15,11,11)
5	Florian Kapała	Rawicz	37	(13,11,12,12)
6	Mieczysław Połukard	Bydgoszcz	27	(12,8,7,6)
7	Eugeniusz Nazimek	Rzeszów	25	(4,7,8,10)
8	Tadeusz Teodorowicz	Wrocław	24	(7,7,8,9)
9	Marian Spychała	Rawicz	24	(7,9,5,8)
10	Janusz Suchecki	Warszawa	17	(10,7,0)
11	Kazimierz Bentke	Warszawa	16	(5,6,3,5)
12	Tadeusz Fijałkowski	Warszawa	13	(8,5)
13	Stanisław Kowalski	Leszno	12	(9,3)
14	Czesław Szypliński	Leszno	12	(5,7)
15	Marian Kaiser	Warszawa	6	(0,6,0)
16	Józef Wieczorek	Rybnik	6	(3,3)
17	Paweł Dziura	Rybnik	5	(4,1)
18	Alojzy Frach	Wrocław	5	(5)
19	Konstanty Pociejkowicz	Wrocław	5	(5)
20	Zdzisław Jałowiecki	Częstochowa	4	(4)
21	Jan Krakowiak	Łódź	4	(4)
22	Norbert Świtała	Bydgoszcz	3	(3)
23	Waldemar Miechowski	Częstochowa	3	(3)
24	Mieczysław Staszczak	Warszawa	3	(3)
25	Bernard Kacperak	Częstochowa	1	(1)
26	Eugeniusz Zendrowski	Warszawa	0	(0)

=== Criterium of Aces ===
The Criterium of Aces was won by Włodzimierz Szwendrowski.

== Team ==
=== Team Speedway Polish Championship ===
The 1955 Team Speedway Polish Championship was the eighth edition of the Team Polish Championship.

The Second League returned after a three-year absence. In First and Second League, matches were played with part two teams, with it playing it matches return. Teams were made up of six drivers plus two reserves. The score of heat: 3–2–1–0. Mecz consisted with 9 heats. For winning a game a team received 2 points, draw – 1 point, loss – 0 points. The drivers from main squad started in the match three times. The quantity of small points was added up.

==== First League ====
Pos	Team	Match	Points	Won	Draw	Lost	+/-
1	Gwardia Bydgoszcz	10	18	9	0	1	?
2	Kolejarz Rawicz	10	14	7	0	3	?
3	Sparta Wrocław	10	12	6	0	4	?
4	Budowlani Warszawa	10	11	5	1	4	?
5	Unia Leszno	10	5	2	1	7	?
6	CWKS Warszawa	10	0	0	0	10	?

Medalists

Gwardia Bydgoszcz	Bolesław Bonin, Zbigniew Raniszewski, Mieczysław Połukard, Norbert Świtała, Rajmund Świtała, Jan Malinowski, Antoni Kowalski, Kazimierz Kurek, Feliks Błajda
Kolejarz Rawicz	Florian Kapała, Marian Spychała, Marian Jankowski, Henryk Ignasiak, Wacław Wechmann, Franciszek Cieślawski
Sparta Wrocław	Edward Kupczyński, Tadeusz Teodorowicz, ?

==== Second League ====
Pos	Team	Match	Points	Won	Draw	Lost	+/-
1	Górnik Rybnik	12	20	10	0	2	+189
2	Sparta Łódź	12	20	10	0	2	+116
3	Włókniarz Częstochowa	12	18	9	0	3	+104
4	Stal Rzeszów	12	12	6	0	6	+48
5	Stal Świętochłowice	12	8	4	0	8	−103
6	Kolejarz-Stal Ostrów Wlkp.	12	4	2	0	10	−166
7	Stal Gorzów Wlkp.	12	2	1	0	11	−188
