= 1953 Polish speedway season =

Motorcycle racing competition

The 1953 Polish Speedway season was the 1953 season of motorcycle speedway in Poland.

== Individual ==
=== Polish Individual Speedway Championship ===
The 1953 Individual Speedway Polish Championship was held over four legs.

- Rybnik, 14 June 1953
- Warsawa, 30 August 1953
- Leszno, 13 September 1953
- Wrocław, 4 October 1953

Pos.	Rider	Club	Total	Points
1	Florian Kapala	Rawicz	31	(8,11,9,11)
2	Bolesław Bonin	Bydgoszcz	30	(10,4,10,10)
3	Tadeusz Fijałkowski	Warszawa	29	(8,10,10,9)
4	Marian Kuśnierek	Leszno	26	(12,6,8,5)
5	Edward Kupczyński	Wrocław	23	(7,8,6,8)
6	Janusz Suchecki	Warszawa	22	(8,5,8,6)
7	Włodzimierz Szwendrowski	Łódź	19	(8,6,x,5)
8	Józef Olejniczak	Leszno	17	(x,8,8,1)
9	Norbert Świtała	Wrocław	16	(4,4,4,8)
10	Zbigniew Raniszewski	Bydgoszcz	15	(4,5,5,5)
11	Waldemar Miechowski	Częstochowa	9	(x,0,4,5)
12	Paweł Dziura	Rybnik	9	(2,3,3,3)
13	Robert Nawrocki	Świętochłowice	8	(2,4,2,2)
14	Jan Paluch	Rybnik	2	(2,x,x,x)
15	Jerzy Brendler	Częstochowa	2	(2,x,x,x)

=== Criterium of Aces ===
The Criterium of Aces was won by Zbigniew Raniszewski.

== Team ==
=== Team Speedway Polish Championship ===
The 1953 Team Speedway Polish Championship was the sixth edition of the Team Polish Championship.

Rules

In First League, matches were played with part two teams, without it playing it matches return. Teams were made up of 6 drivers plus 2 reserves. The score of heat: 3–2–1–0. Mecz consisted of 9 heats. For winning a game a team received 2 points, draw – 1 point, lost – 0 points. The drivers from main squad started in a match three times. The quantity of small points was added up.

Before the season it was established that only 4 full rounds would take place with only the first 8 teams competing in the 5th round. After playing 5 rounds the 4 first teams played in the "Final Round".

Stal Ostrów Wlkp. was moved to Świętochłowice.

== First League ==
Pos	Team	Match	Points	Won	Draw	Lost	+/-
1	Gwardia Bydgoszcz	5	10	5	0	0	+71
2	Spójnia Wrocław	5	8	4	0	1	+50
3	Unia Leszno	5	7	3	1	1	+40
4	CWKS Wrocław	5	7	3	1	1	+31
5	Górnik Rybnik	5	6	3	0	2	−6
6	Włókniarz Częstochowa	5	4	2	0	3	−36
7	Budowlani Warszawa	5	3	1	1	3	−22
8	Ogniwo Łódź	5	3	1	1	3	−38
9	Kolejarz Rawicz	4	0	0	0	4	−18
10	Stal Świętochłowice	4	0	0	0	4	−72

=== Final Round ===
Pos	Team	Match	Points	Won	Draw	Lost	+/-
1	Unia Leszno	3	4	2	0	1	+16
2	Gwardia Bydgoszcz	3	4	2	0	1	+5
3	Spójnia Wrocław	3	4	2	0	1	+4
4	CWKS Wrocław	3	2	1	0	2	−25

Date	Home		Away
16 Aug	Unia Leszno	27:26	Spójnia Wrocław
16 Aug	Gwardia Bydgoszcz	38:13	CWKS Wrocław
30 Aug	Spójnia Wrocław	26:27	Gwardia Bydgoszcz
30 Aug	CWKS Wrocław	30:24	Unia Leszno
20 Sep	Spójnia Wrocław	30:24	CWKS Wrocław
20 Sep	Gwardia Bydgoszcz	16:37	Unia Leszno

=== Final Classification ===
Pos	Team
1	Unia Leszno
2	Gwardia Bydgoszcz
3	Spójnia Wrocław
4	CWKS Wrocław
5	Górnik Rybnik
6	Włókniarz Częstochowa
7	Budowlani Warszawa
8	Ogniwo Łódź
9	Kolejarz Rawicz
10	Stal Świętochłowice

=== Medalists ===
Unia Leszno	Marian Kuśnierek, Andrzej Krzesiński, Kazimierz Bentke, Józef Olejniczak, Stanisław Glapiak, Mieczysław Cichocki, Zdzisław Smoczyk, Stanisław Kowalski, Franciszek Kutrowski
Gwardia Bydgoszcz	Bolesław Bonin, Zbigniew Raniszewski, Eugeniusz Nazimek, Alfred Spyra, Kazimierz Kurek, Jerzy Jeżewski, Feliks Błajda
Spójnia Wrocław	Edward Kupczyński, Jerzy Sałabun, Tadeusz Teodorowicz, Roman Wielgosz, Jerzy Błoch, Alojzy Frach, Albin Tomczyszyn, Adolf Słaboń
