= 1978 Polish speedway season =

Motorcycle racing competition

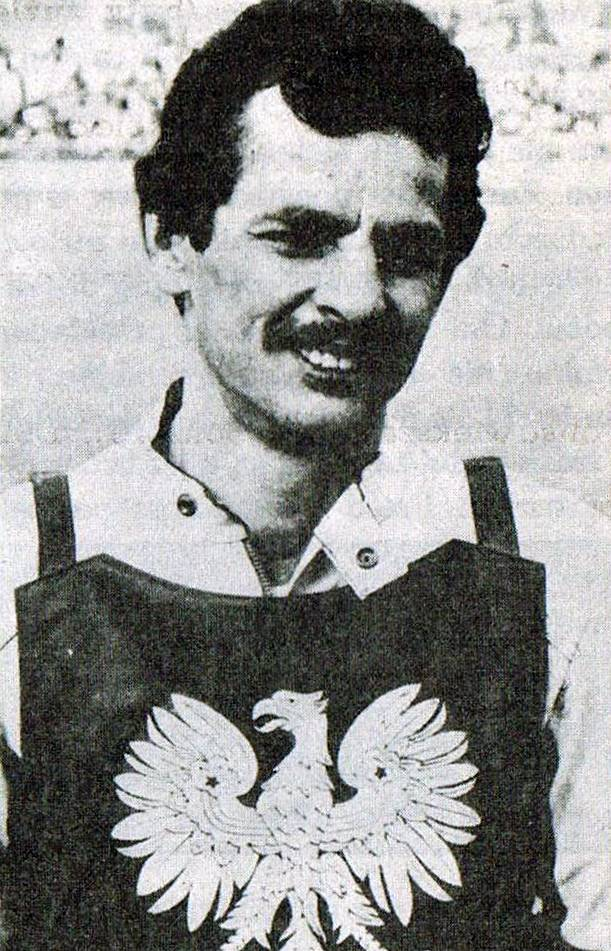
- Bolesław Proch; Runner-up in the Polish Championship and Golden Helmet and league winner with Gorzów

The 1978 Polish Speedway season was the 1978 season of motorcycle speedway in Poland.

== Individual ==
=== Polish Individual Speedway Championship ===
The 1978 Individual Speedway Polish Championship final was held on 22 July at Gorzów.

Pos.	Rider	Club	Total	Points
1	Bernard Jąder	Leszno	13	(3,3,2,3,2)
2	Bolesław Proch	Gorzów Wlkp.	12	(3,3,3,w,3)
3	Robert Słaboń	Wrocław	11 +3	(2,w,3,3,3)
4	Andrzej Huszcza	Zielona Góra	11 +2	(1,3,3,2,2)
5	Mieczysław Woźniak	Gorzów Wlkp.	9	(2,2,2,3,w)
6	Stanisław Turek	Leszno	8	(3,0,1,1,3)
7	Bogdan Skrobisz	Gdańsk	8	(2,2,3,1,w)
8	Mariusz Okoniewski	Leszno	6	(0,1,0,2,3)
9	Antoni Fojcik	Rybnik	6	(3,2,1,w,–)
10	Zbigniew Filipiak	Zielona Góra	6	(0,1,2,2,1)
11	Alfred Siekierka	Opole	5	(0,2,t,3,d)
12	Grzegorz Kuźniar	Rzeszów	5	(2,t,2,–,1)
13	Ryszard Fabiszewski	Gorzów Wlkp.	3	(t,3,u,–,–)
14	Jerzy Kochman	Świętochłowice	2	(1,0,0,1,d)
15	Piotr Pyszny	Rybnik	2	(1,1,d,t,–)
16	Franciszek Stach	Opole	1	(1,u,–,–,–)
17	Daniel Chmielewski (res)	Częstochowa	0	(d,u)
18	Grzegorz Szczepanik (res)	Rybnik	7	(1,2,1,2,2)
19	Marek Towalski (res)	Gorzów Wlkp.	1	(0,0,0,1)
20	Bolesław Rzewiński (res)	Gorzów Wlkp.	2	(1,1,0)

=== Golden Helmet ===
The 1978 Golden Golden Helmet (Polish: Turniej o Złoty Kask, ZK) organised by the Polish Motor Union (PZM) was the 1978 event for the league's leading riders.

Final

Pos.	Rider	Club	Total	Points
1	Zenon Plech	Gdańsk	14	(2,3,3,3,3)
2	Bolesław Proch	Gorzów Wlkp.	13	(3,2,3,3,2)
3	Andrzej Huszcza	Zielona Góra	12	(3,1,2,3,3)
4	Mariusz Okoniewski	Leszno	11	(2,3,3,3,d)
5	Bogusław Nowak	Gorzów Wlkp.	11	(3,3,2,1,2)
6	Andrzej Marynowski	Gdańsk	10	(3,3,1,0,3)
7	Mieczysław Woźniak	Gorzów Wlkp.	8	(2,0,3,2,1)
8	Piotr Pyszny	Rybnik	8	(1,1,2,2,2)
9	Bernard Jąder	Leszno	7	(u,2,1,2,2)
10	Henryk Olszak	Zielona Góra	7	(1,2,2,1,1)
11	Stanisław Turek	Leszno	6	(0,1,1,1,3)
12	Paweł Waloszek	Świętochłowice	3	(1,2,d,0,0)
13	Grzegorz Kuźniar	Rzeszów	3	(u,2,0,1,0)
14	Jerzy Kochman	Świętochłowice	3	(2,1,u,u,ns)
15	Stanisław Kowalski	Gdańsk	3	(1,d,1,d,1)
16	Zdzisław Dobrucki	Leszno	0	(u,0,u,ns,ns)
17	Robert Słaboń	Wrocław	0	(u,d,ns,ns,ns)
18	Roman Jankowski	Leszno		(ns)

=== Junior Championship ===
- winner - Wiesław Patynek

=== Silver Helmet ===
- winner - Andrzej Huszcza

=== Bronze Helmet ===
- winner - Mieczysław Kmieciak

== Pairs ==
=== Polish Pairs Speedway Championship ===
The 1978 Polish Pairs Speedway Championship was the 1978 edition of the Polish Pairs Speedway Championship. The final was held on 21 June at Chorzów.

Pos	Team	Pts	Riders
1	Stal Gorzów Wlkp.	28	Bolesław Proch 12, Edward Jancarz 16
2	Unia Leszno	23	Mariusz Okoniewski 11, Bernard Jąder 12
3	Sparta Wrocław	20	Robert Słaboń 9, Ryszard Jany 11
4	Włókniarz Częstochowa	19	Marek Cieślak 14, Daniel Chmielowski 5
5	ROW Rybnik	16	Piotr Pyszny 9, Jerzy Wilim 7
6	Stal Rzeszów	10	Grzegorz Kuźniar 7, Ryszard Romaniak 3
7	Stal Toruń	9	Jerzy Kniaź 5, Wojciech Żabiałowicz 4

== Team ==
=== Team Speedway Polish Championship ===
The 1978 Team Speedway Polish Championship was the 1978 edition of the Team Polish Championship.

Stal Gorzów Wielkopolski won the gold medal for the fourth successive year. The team included Edward Jancarz, Bolesław Proch, Bogusław Nowak and Jerzy Rembas.

=== First League ===
Pos	Club	Pts	W	D	L	+/−
1	Stal Gorzów Wielkopolski	30	15	0	3	+218
2	Wybrzeże Gdańsk	23	11	1	6	+48
3	Włókniarz Częstochowa	22	11	0	7	+173
4	Unia Leszno	20	10	0	8	+216
5	Polonia Bydgoszcz	18	9	0	9	+18
6	ROW Rybnik	18	9	0	9	−2
7	Falubaz Zielona Góra	17	8	1	9	+15
8	Stal Toruń	12	6	0	12	−209
9	Kolejarz Opole	10	5	0	13	−234
10	Śląsk Świętochłowice	10	5	0	13	−243

=== Second League ===
Pos	Club	Pts	W	D	L	+/−
1	Sparta Wrocław	18	9	0	3	+259
2	Motor Lublin	18	9	0	3	+156
3	Unia Tarnów	14	7	0	5	−89
4	Start Gniezno	12	6	0	6	+37
5	Stal Rzeszów	10	5	0	7	+17
6	Gwardia Łódź	6	3	0	9	−148
7	GSŻ Grudziądz	6	3	0	9	−232
