= 1974 Polish speedway season =

Motorcycle racing competition

The 1974 Polish Speedway season was the 1974 season of motorcycle speedway in Poland.

== Individual ==
=== Polish Individual Speedway Championship ===
The 1974 Individual Speedway Polish Championship final was held on 29 September at Gorzów.

Pos.	Rider	Club	Total	Points
1	Zenon Plech	Gorzów Wlkp.	15	(3,3,3,3,3)
2	Edward Jancarz	Gorzów Wlkp.	13 +3	(1,3,3,3,3)
3	Piotr Bruzda	Wrocław	13 +2	(2,3,3,3,2)
4	Zbigniew Filipiak	Zielona Góra	11	(2,1,2,3,3)
5	Zygfryd Kostka	Wrocław	10	(3,3,2,0,2)
6	Zenon Urbaniec	Częstochowa	10	(3,2,1,2,2)
7	Piotr Pyszny	Rybnik	8	(d,2,2,1,3)
8	Jacek Goerlitz	Świętochłowice	7	(1,1,3,2,0)
9	Andrzej Tkocz	Rybnik	7	(1,2,2,1,1)
10	Paweł Waloszek	Świętochłowice	7	(2,1,1,2,1)
11	Henryk Glücklich	Bydgoszcz	6	(3,2,0,0,1)
12	Józef Jarmuła	Częstochowa	5	(0,1,0,2,2)
13	Leszek Marsz	Gdańsk	4	(1,0,1,1,1)
14	Andrzej Wyglenda	Rybnik	2	(2,0,0,d,0)
15	Jan Ząbik	Toruń	2	(0,0,1,1,0)
16	Jan Chudzikowski	Wrocław	0	(u,0,d,0,d)
17	Marek Cieślak (res)	Częstochowa	ns	
18	Jan Mucha (res)	Świętochłowice	ns	

=== Golden Helmet ===
The 1974 Golden Helmet (Polish: Turniej o Złoty Kask, ZK) organised by the Polish Motor Union (PZM) was the 1974 event for the league's leading riders.

Calendar

Date	Venue	Winner
4 IV	Rybnik	Zenon Plech (Gorzów Wlkp.)
25 IV	Bydgoszcz	Andrzej Tkocz (Rybnik)
26 IV	Leszno	Zenon Plech (Gorzów Wlkp.)
7 VI	Częstochowa	Zenon Plech (Gorzów Wlkp.)
8 VIII	Zielona Góra	Zenon Plech (Gorzów Wlkp.)
19 IX	Gorzów Wlkp.	Zbigniew Filipiak (Zielona Góra)

Final classification Note: Result from final score was subtracted with two the weakest events.

Pos.	Rider	Club	Total	RYB	BYD	LES	CZE	ZIE	GOR
1	Zenon Plech	Stal Gorzów Wlkp.	55	13	11	14	14	14	12
2	Jan Mucha	Śląsk Świętochłowice	45	11	12	12	10	6	-
3	Edward Jancarz	Stal Gorzów Wlkp.	44	11	5	-	12	12	9
4	Henryk Glücklich	Polonia Bydgoszcz	39	8	8	5	10	5	13
5	Andrzej Tkocz	ROW Rybnik	38	12	14	6	6	-	2
6	Bogusław Nowak	Stal Gorzów Wlkp.	36	5	7	13	11	-	-
7	Andrzej Jurczyński	Włókniarz Częstochowa	34	4	7	10	12	4	5
8	Zbigniew Filipiak	Falubaz Zielona Góra	34	7	7	4	2	7	13
9	Paweł Waloszek	Śląsk Świętochłowice	33	9	6	-	9	9	-
10	Ryszard Fabiszewski	Stal Gorzów Wlkp.	33	4	4	11	11	2	7
11	Zdzisław Dobrucki	Unia Leszno	30	3	3	6	5	9	10
12	Bernard Jąder	Unia Leszno	22	2	4	11	5	-	-
13	Stanisław Kasa	Polonia Bydgoszcz	15	0	7	2	4	2	-

== Pairs ==
=== Polish Pairs Speedway Championship ===
The 1974 Polish Pairs Speedway Championship was the 1974 edition of the Polish Pairs Speedway Championship. The final was held at Bydgoszcz on 20 October.

Pos	Team	Pts	Riders
1	Polonia Bydgoszcz	26	Henryk Glücklich 13, Stanisław Kasa 13
2	Stal Gorzów Wlkp.	25	Edward Jancarz 14, Zenon Plech 11
3	ROW Rybnik	17	Piotr Pyszny 13, Jan Koczy 4
4	Śląsk Świętochłowice	17	Jacek Goerlitz v9, Paweł Waloszek 8
5	Sparta Wrocław	12	Zygmunt Słowiński 8, Zygfryd Kostka 4
6	Unia Leszno	11	Zdzisław Dobrucki 10, Zbigniew Jąder 1
7	Polonia II Bydgoszcz	15	Marek Ziarnik 10, Andrzej Koselski 4, Kazimierz Ziarnik 1

=== Junior Championship ===
- winner - Jerzy Rembas

=== Silver Helmet ===
- winner - Gerard Stach

== Team ==
=== Team Speedway Polish Championship ===
The 1974 Team Speedway Polish Championship was the 1974 edition of the Team Polish Championship.

Włókniarz Częstochowa won the gold medal. The team included Marek Cieślak, Józef Jarmuła and Andrzej Jurczyński.

=== First League ===
Pos	Club	Pts	W	D	L	+/−
1	Włókniarz Częstochowa	21	10	1	3	+124
2	Stal Gorzów Wielkopolski	20	10	0	4	+161
3	ROW Rybnik	18	8	2	4	+25
4	Sparta Wrocław	14	7	0	7	–16
5	Polonia Bydgoszcz	13	6	1	7	+60
6	Unia Leszno	11	5	1	8	–64
7	Falubaz Zielona Góra	8	3	2	9	–188
8	Śląsk Świętochłowice	7	3	1	10	–102

=== Second League ===
Pos	Club	Pts	W	D	L	+/−
1	Kolejarz Opole	26	13	0	1	+345
2	Wybrzeże Gdańsk	20	10	0	4	+82
3	Motor Lublin	18	9	0	5	+146
4	Unia Tarnów	14	7	0	7	–41
5	Stal Toruń	12	6	0	8	–28
6	Stal Rzeszów	12	6	0	8	–30
7	Start Gniezno	8	4	0	10	–168
8	Gwardia Łódź	2	1	0	13	–306
