= 1969 Polish speedway season =

Motorcycle racing competition

The 1969 Polish Speedway season was the 1969 season of motorcycle speedway in Poland.

== Individual ==
=== Polish Individual Speedway Championship ===
The 1969 Individual Speedway Polish Championship final was held on 12 October at Rybnik.

Pos.	Rider	Club	Total	Points
1	Andrzej Wyglenda	ROW Rybnik	14+3	(3,3,2,3,3)
2	Paweł Waloszek	Śląsk Świętochłowice	14+2	(3,2,3,3,3)
3	Jerzy Trzeszkowski	Sparta Wrocław	13	(3,3,2,2,3)
4	Zygmunt Pytko	Unia Tarnów	10	(3,3,2,0,2)
5	Jerzy Szczakiel	Kolejarz Opole	9	(0,1,3,3,2)
6	Józef Jarmuła	Śląsk Świętochłowice	8	(2,u,3,1,2)
7	Stanisław Tkocz	ROW Rybnik	8	(0,2,2,1,3)
8	Andrzej Pogorzelski	Stal Gorzów Wlkp.	8	(2,0,1,3,2)
9	Zbigniew Podlecki	Wybrzeże Gdańsk	8	(1,3,1,2,1)
10	Jan Mucha	Śląsk Świętochłowice	7	(2,2,3,u,–)
11	Henryk Glücklich	Polonia Bydgoszcz	6	(1,2,d,2,1)
12	Jerzy Padewski	Stal Gorzów Wlkp.	5	(2,1,1,u,1)
13	Piotr Bruzda	Sparta Wrocław	3	(0,0,0,2,1)
14	Edmund Migoś	Stal Gorzów Wlkp.	3	(1,1,1,0,w)
15	Jerzy Kowalski	Unia Leszno	2	(1,1,d,u)
16	Andrzej Perczyński	Motor Lublin	1	(0,d,0,1,0)
17	Jerzy Gryt (res)	ROW Rybnik	0	(0)
18	Edward Jancarz	Stal Gorzów Wlkp.		(ns)
19	Antoni Woryna	ROW Rybnik		(ns)

=== Golden Helmet ===
The 1969 Golden Golden Helmet (Polish: Turniej o Złoty Kask, ZK) organised by the Polish Motor Union (PZM) was the 1969 event for the league's leading riders.

Calendar

Date	Venue	Winner
11 IV	Częstochowa	Zbigniew Podlecki (Gdańsk)
25 IV	Wrocław	Andrzej Wyglenda (Rybnik)
30 V	Gdańsk	Andrzej Wyglenda (Rybnik)
18 VII	Świętochłowice	Edward Jancarz (Gorzów Wlkp.)
15 VIII	Gorzów Wlkp.	Edward Jancarz (Gorzów Wlkp.)
9 IX	Bydgoszcz	Edward Jancarz (Gorzów Wlkp.)
26 IX	Rzeszów	Andrzej Pogorzelski (Gorzów Wlkp.)
26 X	Rybnik	Paweł Waloszek (Świętochłowice)

Final classification= Note: Result from final score was subtracted with two the weakest events.

Pos.	Rider	Club	Total	CZE	WRO	GDA	ŚWI	GOR	BYD	RZE	RYB
1	Edward Jancarz	Stal Gorzów Wlkp.	79	7	12	9	15	15	15	13	-
2	Andrzej Pogorzelski	Stal Gorzów Wlkp.	63	12	6	9	11	10	7	14	0
3	Andrzej Wyglenda	ROW Rybnik	60	-	13	14	6	12	12	-	3
4	Henryk Glücklich	Polonia Bydgoszcz	60	7	8	9	5	7	12	12	12
5	Paweł Waloszek	Śląsk Świętochłowice	59	10	10	9	7	-	-	9	14
6	Zdzislaw Dobrucki	Unia Leszno	51	12	6	12	7	4	-	8	6
7	Zygmunt Pytko	Unia Tarnów	51	11	10	-	8	1	7	11	4
8	Jerzy Trzeszkowski	Sparta Wrocław	47	9	11	5	2	5	2	9	8
9	Stanisław Kasa	Polonia Bydgoszcz	43	4	3	6	-	1	11	9	10
10	Jerzy Padewski	Stal Gorzów Wlkp.	41	7	2	7	10	11	4	-	-
11	Edmund Migoś	Stal Gorzów Wlkp.	38	3	7	-	6	8	8	-	6
12	Piotr Bruzda	Sparta Wrocław	30	9	5	3	3	2	3	4	6

=== Junior Championship ===
- winner - Zdzisław Dobrucki

=== Silver Helmet ===
- winner - Jerzy Szczakiel

== Team ==
=== Team Speedway Polish Championship ===
The 1969 Team Speedway Polish Championship was the 22nd edition of the Team Polish Championship.

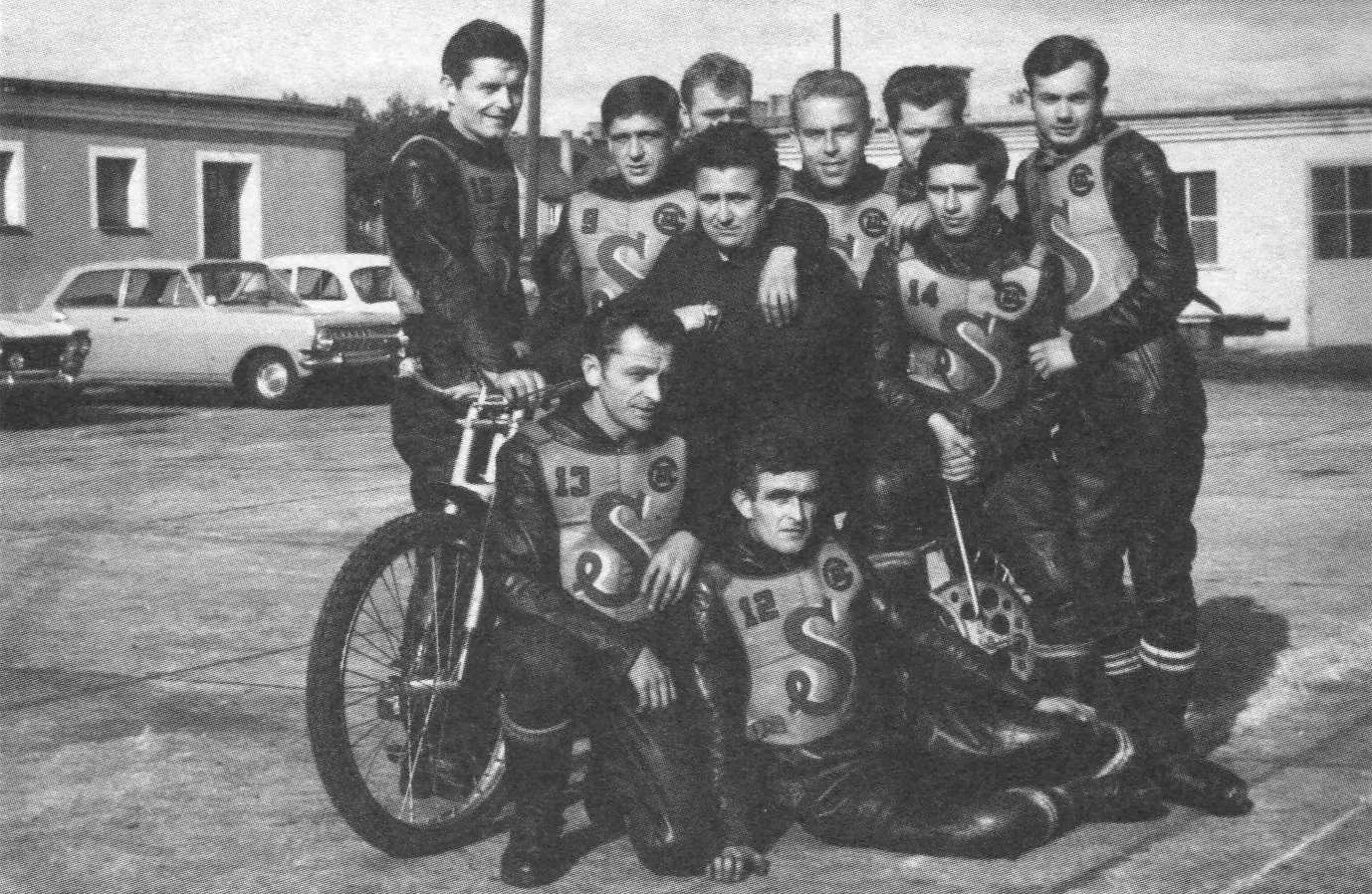
1969 Champions - Stal Gorzów Wielkopolski

Stal Gorzów Wielkopolski ended the domination of KS ROW Rybnik by winning the gold medal. The team included Edward Jancarz, Andrzej Pogorzelski, Edmund Migoś and Jerzy Padewski.

=== First League ===
Pos	Club	Pts	W	D	L	+/−
1	Stal Gorzów Wielkopolski	22	10	2	2	+175
2	Śląsk Świętochłowice	19	9	1	4	+131
3	ROW Rybnik	18	9	0	5	+91
4	Polonia Bydgoszcz	15	7	1	6	+34
5	Sparta Wrocław	14	7	0	7	–35
6	Wybrzeże Gdańsk	9	4	1	9	–73
7	Włókniarz Częstochowa	9	4	1	9	–102
8	Stal Rzeszów	6	2	2	10	–221

=== Second League ===
Pos	Club	Pts	W	D	L	+/−
1	Kolejarz Opole	24	12	0	4	+268
2	Unia Leszno	24	12	0	4	+257
3	Unia Tarnów	22	11	0	5	+194
4	Zgrzeblarki Zielona Góra	21	10	1	5	+17
5	Motor Lublin	19	9	1	6	+20
6	Start Gniezno	16	8	0	8	–11
7	Gwardia Łódź	10	5	0	11	–78
8	Stal Toruń	8	4	0	12	–64
9	Karpaty Krosno	0	0	0	16	–603
