= 1951 Polish speedway season =

Motorcycle racing competition

The 1951 Polish Speedway season was the 1951 season of motorcycle speedway in Poland.

== Individual ==
=== Polish Individual Speedway Championship ===
The 1951 Individual Speedway Polish Championship was held in Wrocław on 14 October 1951.

Pos.	Rider	Club	Total	Points
1	Wlodzimierz Szwendrowski	Bytom	14	(2,3,3,3,3)
2	Alfred Spyra	Rybnik	14	(3,2,3,3,3)
3	Zbigniew Raniszewski	Bydgoszcz	13	(3,3,1,3,3)
4	Stanisław Glapiak	Leszno	11	(d,3,3,2,3)
5	Tadeusz Fijałkowski	Warszawa	10	(3,2,2,2,1)
6	Janusz Suchecki	Warszawa	9	(2,0,3,2,2)
7	Bolesław Bonin	Bydgoszcz	9	(3,1,2,1,2)
8	Paweł Dziura	Rybnik	7	(2,3,1,1,w)
9	Józef Olejniczak	Leszno	6	(1,u,d,3,2)
10	Eugeniusz Zenderowski	Warszawa	6	(d,1,2,2,1)
11	Leszek Próchniak	Warszawa	6	(2,2,d,0,2)
12	Jan Kwaśniewski	Warszawa	4	(1,1,1,0,1)
13	Edward Kupczynski	Wrocław	3	(1,2,u,0,0)
14	Marian Kaznowski	Częstochowa	3	(1,1,0,1,0)
15	Stefan Maciejewski	Ostrów Wlkp.	2	(0,0,2,0,0)
16	Marian Spychała	Rawicz	2	(0,0,1,0,1)

=== Criterium of Aces ===
The Criterium of Aces was won by Zbigniew Raniszewski.

== Team ==
=== Team Speedway Polish Championship ===
The 1951 Team Speedway Polish Championship was the fourth edition of the Team Polish Championship.

Rules In First League, matches were played on a one leg basis only. Teams were made up of 6 riders and 2 reserves. Heat scoring was: 3–2–1–0 and matches consisted of 9 heats. For winning a match a team received 2 points. The rider from a main squad started in a match three times. The quantity of small points was added up.

Before the season the Main Commission of Physical Education (Polish: Główna Komisja Kultury Fizycznej, GKKF) and Sport' Commission of Polish Motor Union selected ten teams to establish the league:

- six teams who representatives of Sport Unions of Professional Associations (Zrzeszenia Sportowych Związków Zawodowych): Unia Leszno, Budowlani Warszawa, Ogniwo Bytom, Górnik Rybnik, Stal Ostrów Wlkp. and Kolejarz Rawicz,
- one team who representatives of Army: CWKS Warszawa,
- one team who representatives of Police: Gwardia Bydgoszcz after Race-Off,
- two other teams: Włókniarz Częstochowa and Spójnia Wrocław.

On 23 April 1951 in Rzeszów Police' Speedway Clubs played Race-Off. Gwardia Bydgoszcz won and qualified to the league. In this event Gwardia Poznań and Gwardia Rzeszow played.

==== First League ====
Pos	Team	Match	Points	Won	Lost	+/-
1	Unia Leszno	9	16	8	1	+112
2	Gwardia Bydgoszcz	9	14	7	2	+107
3	Górnik Rybnik	9	14	7	2	+70
4	CWKS Warszawa	9	12	6	3	+24
5	Ogniwo Bytom	9	10	5	4	+31
6	Budowlani Warszawa	9	6	3	6	+24
7	Stal Ostrów Wielkopolski	9	6	3	6	−16
8	Kolejarz Rawicz	9	6	3	6	−76
9	Włókniarz Częstochowa	9	4	2	7	−137
10	Spójnia Wrocław	9	2	1	8	−139

Medalists

Unia Leszno	Józef Olejniczak, Stanisław Glapiak, Henryk Woźniak, Jan Malinowski, Kazimierz Bentke, Zbigniew Chałupczak, Stanisław Przybylski, Jan Najdrowski, Zbigniew Sander, Ryszard Gościniak, Czesław Szałkowski, Baranowski, Bruch
Gwardia Bydgoszcz	Eugeniusz Nazimek, Bolesław Bonin, Zbigniew Raniszewski, Franciszek Śrubkowski, Józef Buda, Feliks Błajda, Staromiejski, Kielar, Kazimierz Kurek, Roman Zakrzewski, Antosiewicz, Jerzy Jeżewski, Zygmunt Garyantosiewicz
Budowlani Rybnik	Paweł Dziura, Alfred Spyra, Ludwik Draga, Robert Nawrocki, Józef Wieczorek, Baron
