= Polish Individual Speedway Championship =

Annual speedway sporting event

- Sport: Motorcycle speedway
- Founded: 1948
- Most titles: Tomasz Gollob (8)

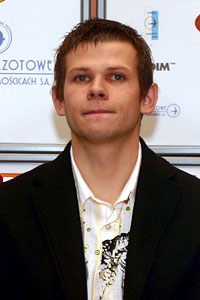
2005, 2010, 2013 and 2019 Polish champion, Janusz Kołodziej.

The Individual Speedway Polish Championship (Polish: Indywidualne Mistrzostwa Polski, IMP) is an annual speedway event held each year organized by the Polish Motor Union (PZM) since 1932.

Tomasz Gollob is the most successful rider in the history of the competition, having won it a record eight times.

== Previous winners ==
Year		Winners	2nd place	3rd place
1948	Kraków	Final was cancelled		
1949	Leszno	Alfred Smoczyk; LKM Leszno	Eugeniusz Zendrowski; Skra Warsaw	Jan Paluch; Ogniwo Bytom
1950	Kraków	Józef Olejniczak; Unia Leszno	Tadeusz Kołeczek; Ogniwo Łódź	Florian Kapała; Kolejarz Rawicz
1951	Wrocław	Włodzimierz Szwendrowski; Ogniwo Bytom	Alfred Spyra; Budowlani Rybnik	Zbigniew Raniszewski; Gwardia Bydgoszcz
1952	Wrocław	Edward Kupczyński; Spójnia Wrocław	Tadeusz Fijałkowski; Budowlani Warsaw	Janusz Suchecki; CWKS Wrocław
1953	Rybnik; Warsaw; Leszno; Wrocław	Florian Kapała; Kolejarz Rawicz	Bolesław Bonin; Gwardia Bydgoszcz	Tadeusz Fijałkowski; Budowlani Warsaw
1954	Wrocław; Katowice; Leszno; Bydgoszcz; Warsaw	Mieczysław Połukard; Spójnia Wrocław	Janusz Suchecki; Budowlani Warsaw	Edward Kupczyński; Spójnia Wrocław
1955	Rybnik; Leszno; Bydgoszcz; Wrocław	Włodzimierz Szwendrowski; Sparta Łódź	Andrzej Krzesiński; Unia Leszno	Zbigniew Raniszewski; Gwardia Bydgoszcz
1956	Rzeszów; Leszno; Bydgoszcz	Florian Kapała; Kolejarz Rawicz	Edward Kupczyński; Slęza Wrocław	Stanisław Tkocz; Górnik Rybnik
1957	Rybnik	Marian Kaiser; Legia Warsaw	Joachim Maj; Górnik Rybnik	Edward Kupczyński; Sparta Wrocław
1958	Rybnik	Stanisław Tkocz; Górnik Rybnik	Edward Kupczyński; Sparta Wrocław	Joachim Maj; Górnik Rybnik
1959	Rybnik	Stefan Kwoczała; Włókniarz Częstochowa	Jan Malinowski; Stal Rzeszów	Florian Kapała; Stal Rzeszów
1960	Rybnik	Konstanty Pociejkewicz; Sparta Wrocław	Marian Kaiser; Legia Gdańsk	Bernard Kacperak; Włókniarz Częstochowa
Year		Winners	2nd place	3rd place
1961	Rzeszów	Florian Kapała; Stal Rzeszów	Marian Kaiser; Legia Gdańsk	Henryk Żyto; Unia Leszno
1962	Rzeszów	Florian Kapała; Stal Rzeszów	Henryk Żyto; Unia Leszno	Joachim Maj; Górnik Rybnik
1963	Rybnik	Henryk Żyto; Unia Leszno	Joachim Maj; Górnik Rybnik	Marian Kaiser; Wybrzeże Gdańsk
1964	Rybnik	Andrzej Wyglenda; Górnik Rybnik	Joachim Maj; Górnik Rybnik	Andrzej Pogorzelski; Stal Gorzów Wlkp.
1965	Rybnik	Stanisław Tkocz; Górnik Rybnik	Andrzej Wyglenda; Górnik Rybnik	Andrzej Pogorzelski; Stal Gorzów Wlkp.
1966	Rybnik	Antoni Woryna; ROW Rybnik	Marian Rose; Stal Toruń	Andrzej Pogorzelski; Stal Gorzów Wlkp.
1967	Rybnik	Zygmunt Pytko; Unia Tarnów	Antoni Woryna; ROW Rybnik	Zygfryd Friedek; Kolejarz Opole
1968	Rybnik	Andrzej Wyglenda; ROW Rybnik	Edmund Migoś; Stal Gorzów Wlkp.	Edward Jancarz; Stal Gorzów Wlkp.
1969	Rybnik	Andrzej Wyglenda; ROW Rybnik	Paweł Waloszek; Śląsk Świętochłowice	Jerzy Trzeszkowski; Sparta Wrocław
1970	Gorzów Wielkopolski	Edmund Migoś; Stal Gorzów Wlkp.	Andrzej Wyglenda; ROW Rybnik	Antoni Woryna; ROW Rybnik
Year		Winners	2nd place	3rd place
1971	Rybnik	Jerzy Gryt; ROW Rybnik	Jerzy Szczakiel; Kolejarz Opole	Andrzej Wyglenda; ROW Rybnik
1972	Bydgoszcz	Zenon Plech; Stal Gorzów Wlkp.	Paweł Waloszek; Śląsk Świętochłowice	Henryk Glücklich; Polonia Bydgoszcz
1973	Rybnik	Andrzej Wyglenda; ROW Rybnik	Jerzy Gryt; ROW Rybnik	Bogusław Nowak; Stal Gorzów Wlkp.
1974	Stal Gorzów Wielkopolski	Zenon Plech; Stal Gorzów Wlkp.	Edward Jancarz; Stal Gorzów Wlkp.	Piotr Bruzda; Sparta Wrocław
1975	Częstochowa	Edward Jancarz; Stal Gorzów Wlkp.	Marek Cieślak; Włókniarz Częstochowa	Paweł Waloszek; Śląsk Świętochłowice
1976	Gorzów Wielkopolski	Zdzisław Dobrucki; Unia Leszno	Jerzy Rembas; Stal Gorzów Wlkp.	Edward Jancarz; Stal Gorzów Wlkp.
1977	Gorzów Wielkopolski	Bogusław Nowak; Stal Gorzów Wlkp.	Andrzej Tkocz; ROW Rybnik	Mieczysław Woźniak; Stal Gorzów Wlkp.
1978	Gorzów Wielkopolski	Bernard Jąder; Unia Leszno	Bolesław Proch; Stal Gorzów Wlkp.	Robert Słaboń; Sparta Wrocław
1979	Gorzów Wielkopolski	Zenon Plech; Wybrzeże Gdańsk	Mieczysław Woźniak; Stal Gorzów Wlkp.	Robert Słaboń; Sparta Wrocław
1980	Leszno	Bernard Jąder; Unia Leszno	Andrzej Huszcza; Falubaz Zielona Góra	Henryk Olszak; Falubaz Zielona Góra
Year		Winners	2nd place	3rd place
1981	Leszno	Roman Jankowski; Unia Leszno	Zenon Plech; Wybrzeże Gdańsk	Edward Jancarz; Stal Gorzów Wlkp.
1982	Zielona Góra	Andrzej Huszcza; Falubaz Zielona Góra	Leonard Raba; Kolejarz Opole	Roman Jankowski; Unia Leszno
1983	Gdańsk	Edward Jancarz; Stal Gorzów Wlkp.	Zenon Plech; Wybrzeże Gdańsk	Andrzej Huszcza; Falubaz Zielona Góra
1984	Gorzów Wielkopolski	Zenon Plech; Wybrzeże Gdańsk	Jerzy Rembas; Stal Gorzów Wlkp.	Andrzej Huszcza; Falubaz Zielona Góra
1985	Gorzów Wielkopolski	Zenon Plech; Wybrzeże Gdańsk	Bolesław Proch; Polonia Bydgoszcz	Maciej Jaworek; Falubaz Zielona Góra
1986	Zielona Góra	Maciej Jaworek; Falubaz Zielona Góra	Wojciech Żabiałowicz; Apator Toruń	Grzegorz Kuźniar; Stal Rzeszów
1987	Toruń	Wojciech Żabiałowicz; Apator Toruń	Zenon Kasprzak; Unia Leszno	Roman Jankowski; Unia Leszno
1988	Leszno	Roman Jankowski; Unia Leszno	Jan Krzystyniak; Unia Leszno	Zenon Kasprzak; Unia Leszno
1989	Leszno	Wojciech Załuski; Kolejarz Opole	Jan Krzystyniak; Stal Rzeszów	Tomasz Gollob; Wybrzeże Gdańsk
1990	Lublin	Zenon Kasprzak; Unia Leszno	Mirosław Korbel; ROW Rybnik	Tomasz Gollob; Polonia Bydgoszcz
Year		Winners	2nd place	3rd place
1991	Toruń	Sławomir Drabik; Włókniarz Częstochowa	Wojciech Załuski; Kolejarz Opole	Sławomir Dudek; Morawski Zielona Góra
1992	Zielona Góra	Tomasz Gollob; Polonia Bydgoszcz	Jarosław Szymkowiak; Morawski Zielona Góra	Robert Sawina; Apator Toruń
1993	Bydgoszcz	Tomasz Gollob; Polonia-Jutrzenka Bydgoszcz	Tomasz Świątkiewicz; Apator-Elektrim Toruń	Piotr Świst; Stal-Farbpol Gorzów Wlkp.
1994	Wrocław	Tomasz Gollob; Polonia-Jutrzenka Bydgoszcz	Jacek Krzyżaniak; Apator-Elektrim Toruń	Jarosław Olszewski; Wybrzeże-Rafineria Gdańsk
1995	Wrocław	Tomasz Gollob; Polonia-Jutrzenka Bydgoszcz	Piotr Świst; Stal-Michael Gorzów Wlkp.	Rafał Dobrucki; Polonia Piła
1996	Warsaw	Sławomir Drabik; Włókniarz-Malma Częstochowa	Adam Łabędzki; Unia Leszno	Roman Jankowski; Unia Leszno
1997	Częstochowa	Jacek Krzyżaniak; Apator-DGG Toruń	Sławomir Drabik; Włókniarz-Malma Częstochowa	Tomasz Gollob; Jutrzenka-Polonia Bydgoszcz
1998	Bydgoszcz	Jacek Gollob; Jutrzenka-Polonia Bydgoszcz	Tomasz Gollob; Jutzrenka-Polonia Bydgoszcz	Wiesław Jaguś; Apator_DGG Toruń
1999	Bydgoszcz	Piotr Protasiewicz; Jutzrenka-Polonia Bydgoszcz	Tomasz Gollob; Jutzrenka-Polonia Bydgoszcz	Jacek Krzyżaniak; Atlas Wrocław
2000	Piła	Jacek Gollob; Ludwik-Polonia Piła	Jarosław Hampel; Ludwik-Polonia Piła	Jacek Krzyżaniak; Atlas Wrocław
Year		Winners	2nd place	3rd place
2001	Bydgoszcz	Tomasz Gollob; Bractwo-Polonia Bydgoszcz	Robert Sawina; Atlas Wrocław	Sebastian Ułamek; Atlas Wrocław
2002	Toruń	Tomasz Gollob; Point S-Polonia Bydgoszcz	Krzysztof Cegielski; Puls-Start Gniezno	Jacek Krzyżaniak; Atlas Wrocław; Piotr Świst; Stal-Pergo Gorzów Wlkp.
2003	Bydgoszcz	Rune Holta; Top Secret-Włókniarz Częstochowa	Tomasz Gollob; Plusssz-Polonia Bydgoszcz	Tomasz Jędrzejak; Atlas Wrocław
2004	Częstochowa	Grzegorz Walasek; Złomrex-Włókniarz Częstochowa	Jarosław Hampel; Atlas Wrocław	Rune Holta; Złomrex-Włókniarz Częstochowa
2005	Tarnów	Janusz Kołodziej; Unia Tarnów	Tomasz Gollob; Unia Tarnów	Jacek Gollob; Unia Tarnów
2006	Tarnów	Tomasz Gollob; Unia Tarnów	Wiesław Jaguś; Adriana Toruń	Sebastian Ułamek; Złomrex-Włókniarz Częstochowa
2007	Wrocław	Rune Holta; Unia Tarnów	Tomasz Gollob; Unia Tarnów	Damian Baliński; Unia Leszno
2008	Leszno	Adam Skórnicki; PSŻ Milion Team Poznań	Jarosław Hampel; Unia Leszno	Grzegorz Walasek; ZKŻ Kronopol Zielona Góra
2009	Toruń	Tomasz Gollob; Caelum Stal Gorzów Wlkp.	Krzysztof Kasprzak; Unia Leszno	Janusz Kołodziej; Unia Tarnów
2010	Zielona Góra	Janusz Kołodziej; Unia Leszno	Krzysztof Kasprzak; Tauron Azoty Tarnów	Rafał Dobrucki; Falubaz Zielona Góra
Year		Winners	2nd place	3rd place
2011	Leszno	Jarosław Hampel; Unia Leszno	Przemysław Pawlicki; Polonia Piła	Piotr Protasiewicz; Falubaz Zielona Góra
2012	Zielona Góra	Tomasz Jędrzejak; Sparta Wrocław	Rafał Okoniewski; PGE Marma Rzeszów	Krzysztof Buczkowski; Polonia Bydgoszcz
2013	Tarnów	Janusz Kolodziej; Unia Tarnow	Krzysztof Kasprzak; Stal Gorzów Wielkopolski	Maciej Janowski; Sparta Wrocław
2014	Zielona Góra	Krzysztof Kasprzak; Stal Gorzów Wielkopolski	Piotr Pawlicki; Unia Leszno	Janusz Kolodziej; Unia Tarnow
2015	Gorzów Wielkopolski	Maciej Janowski; Sparta Wrocław	Bartosz Zmarzlik; Stal Gorzów Wielkopolski	Tomasz Gapinski; Stal Gorzów Wielkopolski
2016	Leszno	Patryk Dudek; Falubaz Zielona Góra	Piotr Pawlicki; Unia Leszno	Maciej Janowski; Sparta Wrocław
2017	Gorzów Wielkopolski	Szymon Woźniak; Sparta Wrocław	Przemysław Pawlicki; Stal Gorzów Wielkopolski	Patryk Dudek; Falubaz Zielona Góra
2018	Leszno	Piotr Pawlicki; Unia Leszno	Maciej Janowski; Sparta Wrocław	Janusz Kolodziej; Unia Leszno
2019	Leszno	Janusz Kołodziej; Unia Leszno	Bartosz Zmarzlik; Stal Gorzów Wielkopolski	Maciej Janowski; Sparta Wrocław
2020	Leszno	Maciej Janowski; Sparta Wrocław	Bartosz Zmarzlik; Stal Gorzów Wielkopolski	Szymon Woźniak; Stal Gorzów Wielkopolski
Year		Winners	2nd place	3rd place
2021	Leszno	Bartosz Zmarzlik; Stal Gorzów Wielkopolski	Maciej Janowski; Sparta Wrocław	Janusz Kołodziej; Unia Leszno
2022	Grudziądz; Krosno; Rzeszów	Bartosz Zmarzlik; Stal Gorzów Wielkopolski	Dominik Kubera; KM Cross Lublin	Janusz Kołodziej; Unia Leszno
2023	Rzeszów; Piła; Łódź	Bartosz Zmarzlik; KM Cross Lublin	Maciej Janowski; Sparta Wrocław	Patryk Dudek; KS Toruń
2024	Łódź; Bydgoszcz; Lublin	Maciej Janowski; Sparta Wrocław	Patryk Dudek; KS Toruń	Bartosz Zmarzlik; KM Cross Lublin
2025	Toruń; Ostrów; Częstochowa	Patryk Dudek; KS Toruń	Bartosz Zmarzlik; KM Cross Lublin	Dominik Kubera; KM Cross Lublin
2026	Toruń; Bydgoszcz; Ostrów	Maciej Janowski; Sparta Wrocław	Bartosz Zmarzlik; KM Cross Lublin	Kacper Woryna; KM Cross Lublin

== Medals classification ==
Pos	Rider	Total	Gold	Silver	Bronze
1.	Tomasz Gollob	16	8	5	3
2.	Zenon Plech	7	5	2	
3.	Maciej Janowski	10	4	3	3
4.	Andrzej Wyglenda	7	4	2	1
5.	Florian Kapała	6	4	1	1
6.	Bartosz Zmarzlik	9	3	5	1
7.	Janusz Kołodziej	7	3		5
8.	Edward Jancarz	6	2	1	3
9.	Patryk Dudek	5	2	1	2
10.	Sławomir Drabik	3	2	1	
11.	Roman Jankowski	5	2		3
12.	Stanisław Tkocz	3	2		1
	Jacek Gollob	3	2		1
	Rune Holta	3	2		1
15.	Włodzimierz Szwendrowski	2	2		
16.	Bernard Jąder	2	2		
17.	Jarosław Hampel	4	1	3	
	Krzysztof Kasprzak	4	1	3	
19.	Edward Kupczyński	5	1	2	2
20.	Marian Kaiser	4	1	2	1
21.	Piotr Pawlicki	3	1	2	
22.	Jacek Krzyżaniak	5	1	1	3
23.	Andrzej Huszcza	4	1	1	2
24.	Henryk Żyto	3	1	1	1
	Antoni Woryna	3	1	1	1
	Zenon Kasprzak	3	1	1	1
27.	Edmund Migoś	2	1	1	
	Jerzy Gryt	2	1	1	
	Wojciech Żabiałowicz	2	1	1	
	Wojciech Załuski	2	1	1	
	Szymon Woźniak	2	1	1	
32.	Bogusław Nowak	2	1		1
	Maciej Jaworek	2	1		1
	Piotr Protasiewicz	2	1		1
	Grzegorz Walasek	2	1		1
	Tomasz Jędrzejak	2	1		1
37.	Alfred Smoczyk	1	1		
	Józef Olejniczak	1	1		
	Mieczysław Połukard	1	1		
	Stefan Kwoczała	1	1		
	Konstanty Pociejkewicz	1	1		
	Zdzisław Dobrucki	1	1		
	Zygmunt Pytko	1	1		
	Adam Skórnicki	1	1		
