= 1980 Polish speedway season =

Motorcycle racing competition

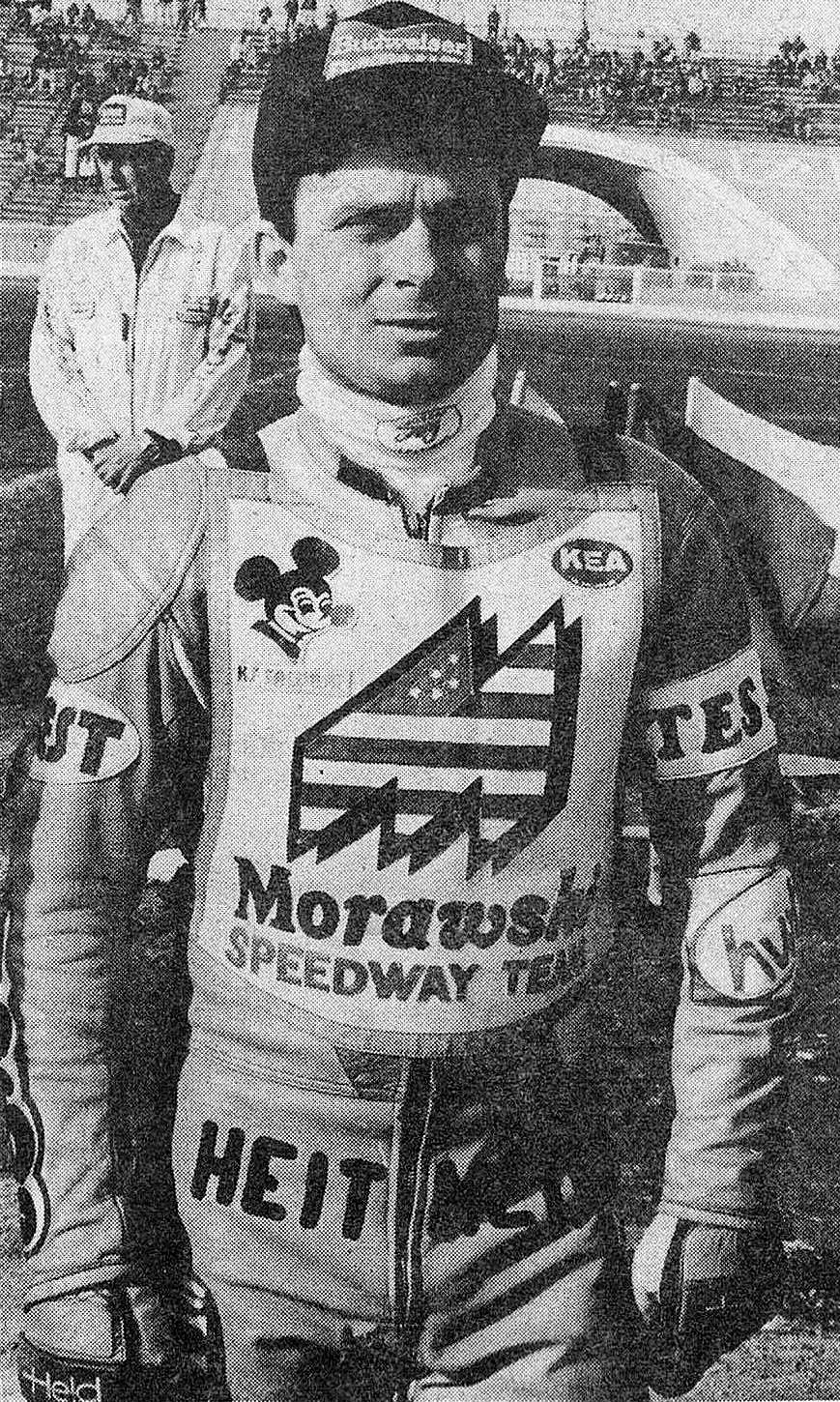
- Maciej Jaworek, who won the year's Silver Helmet

The 1980 Polish Speedway season was the 1980 season of motorcycle speedway in Poland.

== Individual ==
=== Polish Individual Speedway Championship ===
The 1980 Individual Speedway Polish Championship final was held on 22 July at Leszno.

Pos.	Rider	Club	Total	Points
1	Bernard Jąder	Leszno	14	(3,3,3,3,2)
2	Andrzej Huszcza	Zielona Góra	13 +3	(2,3,3,2,3)
3	Henryk Olszak	Zielona Góra	13 +2	(3,3,3,1,3)
4	Edward Jancarz	Gorzów Wlkp.	13 +1	(3,2,2,3,3)
5	Roman Jankowski	Leszno	10	(0,3,2,3,2)
6	Zenon Plech	Gdańsk	10	(1,1,2,3,3)
7	Jerzy Rembas	Gorzów Wlkp.	9	(2,2,3,1,1)
8	Bogusław Nowak	Gorzów Wlkp.	8	(3,2,1,2,w)
9	Kazimierz Adamczak	Leszno	5	(0,2,2,0,1)
10	Marek Towalski	Gorzów Wlkp.	5	(0,2,2,0,1)
11	Eugeniusz Błaszak	Gniezno	3	(2,1,0,–,–)
12	Alfred Krzystyniak	Zielona Góra	3	(1,u,0,1,1)
13	Czesław Piwosz	Leszno	3	(1,1,1,w –)
14	Marek Ziarnik	Bydgoszcz	2	(1,0,0,1,0)
15	Józef Jarmuła	Częstochowa	1	(0,u,1,–,–)
16	Marek Kępa	Lublin	1	(0,1,d,0,d,1)
17	Wojciech Kaczmarek (res)	Gniezno	0	(u/ns)
18	Bolesław Proch (res)	Gorzów Wlkp.	7	(2,0,2,2,1)

=== Golden Helmet ===
The 1980 Golden Golden Helmet (Polish: Turniej o Złoty Kask, ZK) organized by the Polish Motor Union (PZM) was the 1980 event for the league's leading riders. It was held over 4 rounds.

Final standings (top ten)

Pos.	Rider	Club	Total	Points
1	Robert Słaboń	Wrocław	50	12,15,9,14
2	Eugeniusz Błaszak	Gniezno	44	6,14,14,10
3	Marek Kępa	Lublin	40	11,10,8.11
4	Bernard Jąder	Leszno	38	10,11,12,5
5	Czesław Piwosz	Leszno	38	7,10,11,10
6	Jerzy Kochman	Świętochłowice	32	12,6,8,6
7	Wojciech Żabiałowicz	Toruń	29	4,8,8,9
8	Jacek Goerlitz	Opole	28	12,2,4,10
9	Mariusz Okoniewski	Leszno	28	10,2,8,8
10	Marek Towalski	Gorzów Wlkp.	17	5,8,4,0

=== Junior Championship ===
- Winner - Mirosław Berliński

=== Silver Helmet ===
- Winner - Maciej Jaworek

=== Bronze Helmet ===
- Winner - Marek Kępa

== Pairs ==
=== Polish Pairs Speedway Championship ===
The 1980 Polish Pairs Speedway Championship was the 1980 edition of the Polish Pairs Speedway Championship. The final was held on 31 July at Zielona Góra.

Pos	Team	Pts	Riders
1	Unia Leszno	21	Bernard Jąder 14, Czesław Piwosz 7
2	Stal Gorzów Wlkp.	19	Jerzy Rembas 15, Marek Towalski 4
3	Start Gniezno	18	Eugeniusz Błaszak 13, Leon Kujawski 5
4	Falubaz Zielona Góra	13	Henryk Olszak 8, Jan Krzystyniak 5
5	Polonia Bydgoszcz	10	Henryk Glücklich 4, Marek Ziarnik 6
6	Sparta Wrocław	9	Robert Słaboń 8, Henryk Jasek 1

== Team ==
=== Team Speedway Polish Championship ===
The 1980 Team Speedway Polish Championship was the 1980 edition of the Team Polish Championship.

Unia Leszno won the gold medal for the second consecutive season. The team included Mariusz Okoniewski, Roman Jankowski and Bernard Jąder.

=== First League ===
Pos	Club	Pts	W	D	L	+/−
1	Unia Leszno	32	16	0	2	+405
2	ROW Rybnik	24	12	0	6	+148
3	Start Gniezno	22	11	0	7	+199
4	Stal Gorzów Wielkopolski	20	10	0	8	+139
5	Polonia Bydgoszcz	18	9	0	9	+51
6	Apator Toruń	18	9	0	9	–6
7	Falubaz Zielona Góra	16	8	0	10	–13
8	Włókniarz Częstochowa	14	7	0	11	–226
9	Wybrzeże Gdańsk	10	5	0	13	–349
10	Sparta Wrocław	6	3	0	15	–348

=== Second League ===
Pos	Club	Pts	W	D	L	+/−
1	Kolejarz Opole	22	11	0	3	+423
2	Stal Rzeszów	22	11	0	3	+272
3	Śląsk Świętochłowice	16	8	0	6	+23
4	Motor Lublin	15	7	1	6	–13
5	GKM Grudziądz	14	7	0	7	–54
6	Unia Tarnów	12	6	0	8	–164
7	Gwardia Łódź	9	4	1	9	–104
8	Ostrovia Ostrów	2	1	0	13	–383
