= Andrzej Krzesiński (speedway rider) =

Polish speedway rider

- Born: 30 September 1934; Ostrów Wielkopolski, Poland
- Died: 26 December 2003 (aged 69)
- Nationality: Polish

Career history

Poland
- 1951–1952, 1958: Ostrów
- 1953–1955: Leszno
- 1956–1957: CWKS/Legia Warszawa

Individual honours
- 1955: Polish Individual Speedway Championship silver

Team honours
- 1953, 1954: Polish league champion

Andrzej Krzesiński (30 September 1934 – 26 December 2003) was a motorcycle speedway rider from Poland.

== Career ==
Krzesiński started his speedway career with Stal Ostrów Wielkopolski, the club in the city he was born and bred in. His first season was during the 1951 Polish speedway season. When the team moved from Ostrów Wielkopolski to Świętochłowice he joined the all-conquering team of Unia Leszno. He was then part of the team that won the Team Speedway Polish Championship during the 1953 and 1954 seasons.

In 1954, Krzesiński won the Alfred Smoczyk Memorial. The following season in 1955, he finished runner-up to Włodzimierz Szwendrowski in the Polish Individual Speedway Championship.

In 1956, Krzesiński toured the United Kingdom with the Polish team, which cost £2,000 to organise and was paid by the Polish Motor Club and British authorities. During the same year, he spent the season with CWKS Warszawa, this was the same season in which he was involved in the fateful 21 April meeting between Poland and Austria. He crashed and was taken to hospital with head injuries and at the same meeting Zbigniew Raniszewski lost his life.

In 1957, Krzesiński decided to remove a plaster cast which had been applied to an earlier injury and was involved in another serious accident, spending five weeks in hospital (one of which he was unconscious). He rode a few matches in 1958 before retiring.
