= Kraków Speedway =

Polish motorcycle speedway team

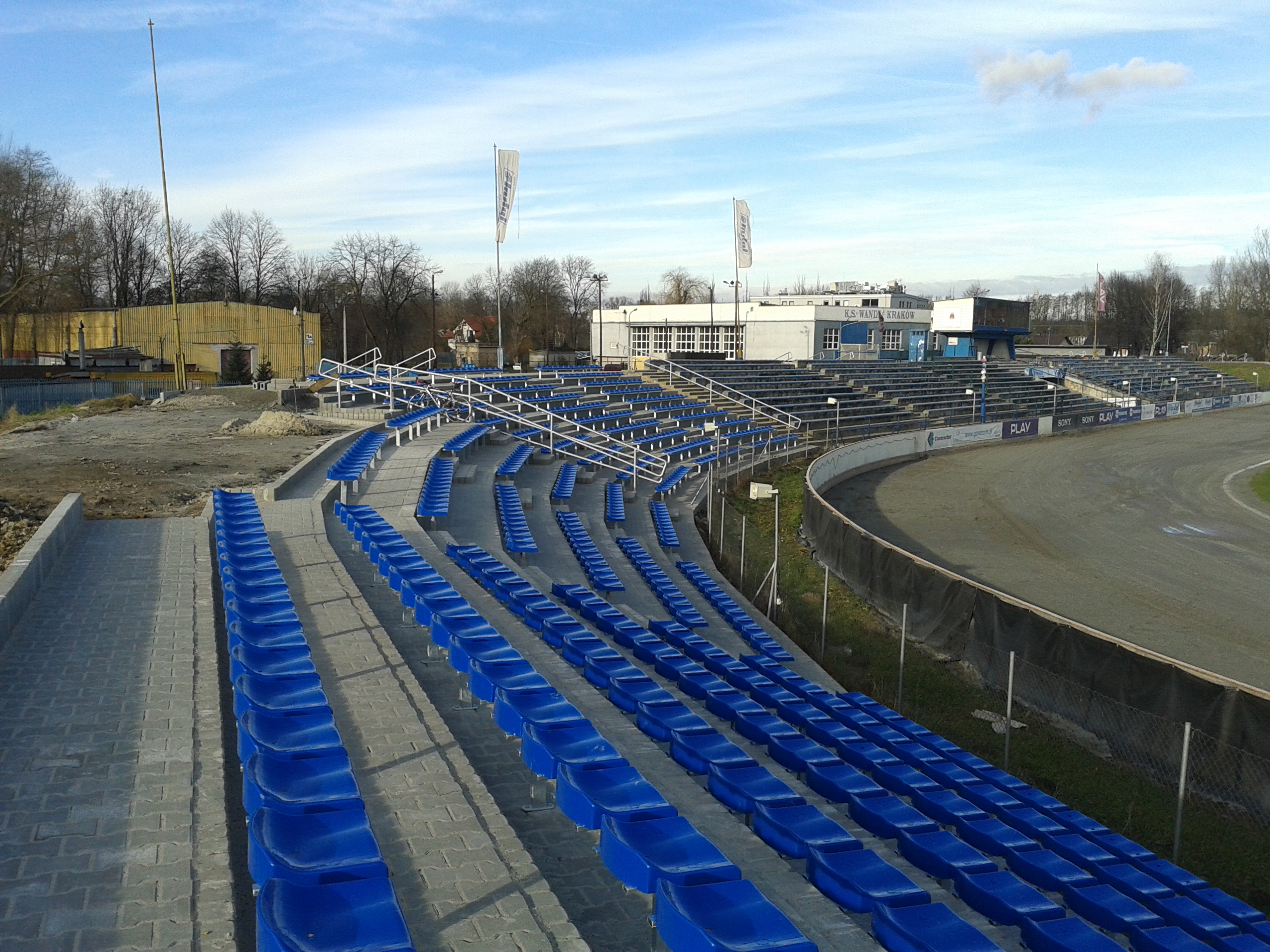

Club information
- Track address: Kraków Speedway Stadium
- Country: Poland
- Team manager: Adam Weigel

Club facts
- Colours: white-blue-white

Major team honours
| Second league | 1960 (Wanda Nowa Huta) |
| Third league | 1959 (Cracovia) |

Kraków Speedway was the Polish motorcycle speedway teams based in Kraków.

== History ==
=== 1956 to 1965 ===
In 1956, the first club to be registered in Kraków was Auto Mobil Klub Nowa Huta (AMK Nowa Huta). The team competed in the second league during the 1956 Polish speedway season. The following season AMK Kraków (as they were called for that season) competed in the third league south group during 1957. The stadium in Nowa Huta (Odmogile Street) was constructed in 1957 and at the end of the 1957 season the AMK club was dissolved but two teams were created by the names of Cracovia Kraków and Wanda Nowa Huta.

Cracovia Kraków moved to a track in Borek Fałęcki and competed in the third league in 1958, they would compete until the end of 1960 when they were dissolved due to high costs. Meanwhile, Wanda Nowa Huta gained promotion to the second division in 1958 and then won the second division (East) in 1960. However, in 1961, Wanda was relegated and after four more seasons experiencing financial problems and poor results they withdrew from the league in 1965.

=== 1993 to 2005 ===
Kraków went without a speedway team for 28 years but in 1993 the club was re-established as Wanda Kraków. During the 1993 Polish speedway season the club finished 7th. Mid-table finishes were seen over the following years, until form dropped and they found themselves bottom of the 1999 league table.

When the Ekstraliga was introduced in 2000, the club were put into the 2. Liga.

The 2001 Polish speedway season was a strange one because the name Kraków was used by Unia Tarnów, who had split from their sports club at the time and therefore competed as TŻ Kraków - Unia Tarnów. Tarnów won the division while Wanda Kraków finished last in the same table. Results continued to go badly and the club propped up the entire league on several occasions. Some fixtures were not met and financial difficulties continued and during the 2005 season the club folded and withdrew from the league.

=== 2010 to 2019 ===
Wanda Kraków returned to action in 2010 but unfortunately finished last again. However, results improved and the club reached the play offs during the 2014 season and were given a place in 1. Liga in 2015. After three seasons in 1. Liga the club were relegated in 2018 and finished last in 2019.

The team dissolved again after the 2019 season and Kraków remains without speedway today.
