= Bernard Kacperak =

Polish speedway rider

- Born: 25 June 1933; Częstochowa, Poland
- Died: 23 August 2007 (aged 74)
- Nationality: Polish

Career history

Poland
- 1953–1970: Częstochowa

Individual honours
- 1960: Polish Individual Speedway Championship bronze

Team honours
- 1959: Polish league champion

Bernard Kacperak (25 June 1933 – 23 August 2007) was a motorcycle speedway rider from Poland.

== Career ==
Kacperak started his speedway career with Włókniarz Częstochowa, the club in the city he was born and bred in. His first season was during the 1953 Polish speedway season. Kacperak would remain loyal to the club throughout his entire career, spending 18 seasons with them from 1953 until 1971.

Kacperak was part of the team that won the Team Speedway Polish Championship during the 1959 Polish speedway season.

The following season in 1960, Kacperak won the bronze medal behind Konstanty Pociejkewicz and Marian Kaiser in the Polish Individual Speedway Championship. That season, he was also part of the Polish team that toured England in 1960.

== Personal life ==
After retirement from speedway, Kacperak ran a car repair shop.
