= Mieczysław Połukard =

Polish speedway rider and coach

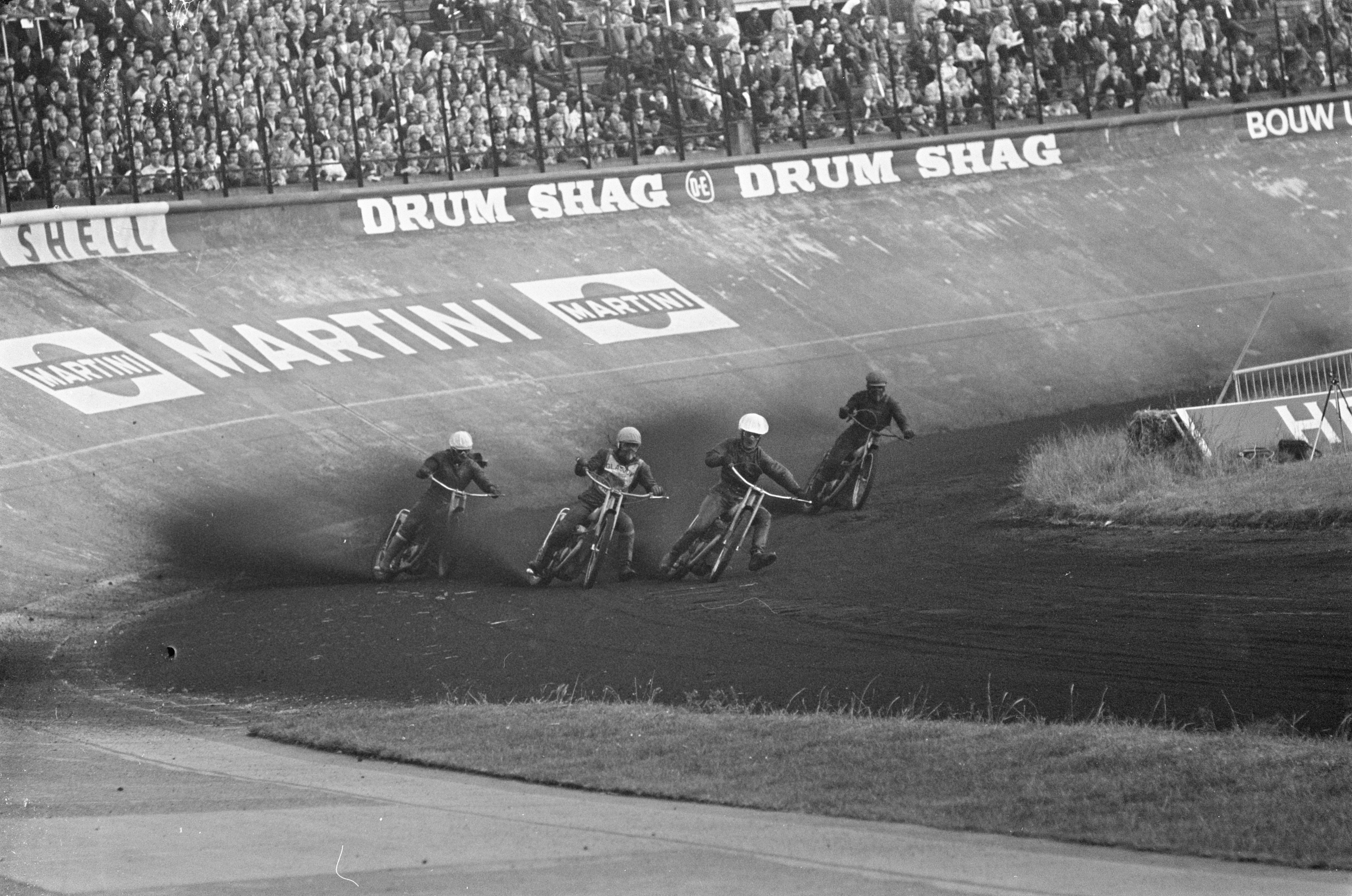
- Połukard wins a race
- Born: 31 August 1930; Warsaw, Poland
- Died: 26 October 1985 (aged 55); Bydgoszcz, Poland
- Nationality: Polish

Career history

Poland
- 1950: Związkowiec Warszawa
- 1951, 1954: Spójnia Wrocław
- 1952-1953: CWKS Wrocław
- 1955-1968: Gwardia/Polonia Bydgoszcz

Individual honours
- 1954: Polish Champion

Team honours
- 1955: Polish League Champion
- 1961: World Team Cup Winner

Mieczysław Połukard (1930 in Warsaw, Poland – 26 October 1985 in Bydgoszcz, Poland) was a Polish motorcycle speedway rider and coach, the first Polish rider to ride in the Individual World Championship Final in 1959 and won the World Team Cup in 1961.

== Career ==
Połukard began his racing career with Sparta Wrocław. In 1955 he moved to Polonia Bydgoszcz.

Połukard was the first Polish rider to ride in the Individual World Championship Final (1959) where he finished 12th with five points. He also represented Poland in the World Team Cup three times, in 1960 (fourth place), 1961 (gold medal) and 1962 (bronze medal).

Połukard was Individual Polish Champion once in 1954. He also rode in Golden Helmet Finals, but he never finished high enough to win a medal. In 1956, he toured the United Kingdom with the Polish team, which cost £2,000 to organise and was paid by the Polish Motor Club and British authorities. He also toured the United Kingdom with the Polish national team during 1960 and one year later in 1961, the New Cross Rangers promoter Johnnie Hoskins unsuccessfully applied for his services to ride in the British leagues.

== Accident ==
In 1968, Połukard decided to retire. In his last match, he was involved in an accident on track, which resulted hospital treatment which required amputating his leg.

== Death ==
Połukard became a coach for Polonia Bydgoszcz. During track training sessions on the track, he stood on the centre green coaching the riders. However, on 25 October 1985, a rider from Gorzów Wielkopolski lost control of his motorcycle and ran into Połukard, killing him.

== Memorial ==
Since 1986, the Criterium of Polish Speedway Leagues Aces speedway meeting in Bydgoszcz, which serves as the official opening of the new season, has Połukard's name (Polish: Kryterium Asów Polskich Lig Żużlowych im. Mieczysława Połukarda).

== Honours ==
- Individual World Championship
  - 1956 - 14th in Continental Final
  - 1957 - 12th in Continental Semi-Final
  - 1958 - 11th in Continental Quarter-Final
  - 1959 - 12th place - 5 points (0,2,0,1,2) - First Polish rider in World Final
  - 1960 - track reserve in World Final
  - 1961 - 15th in European Final
  - 1962 - 12th in Continental Semi-Final
  - 1963 - 10th in Continental Semi-Final
  - 1964 - 10th in Continental Quarter-Final
- World Team Cup
  - 1960 - 4th place - 2 points (0,1,0,1)
  - 1961 - World Champion - 5 points (2,1,2,-)
  - 1962 - Bronze medal - 0 point (0)

== World Final Appearances ==
=== Individual World Championship ===
- 1959 - (England) London, Wembley Stadium - 12th - 5pts
- 1960 - (England) London, Wembley Stadium - Reserve, did not ride

=== World Team Cup ===
- 1960 - (Sweden) Gothenburg, Ullevi (with Konstanty Pociejkewicz / Marian Kaiser / Jan Malinowski) - 4th - 7pts (2)
- 1961 - (Poland) Wrocław, Olympic Stadium (with Marian Kaiser / Henryk Żyto / Florian Kapała / Stanisław Tkocz) - Winner - 32pts (5)
- 1962 - (Czechoslovakia) Slaný (with Marian Kaiser / Florian Kapała / Joachim Maj / Paweł Waloszek) - 3rd - 20pts (0)

=== Individual Ice Speedway World Championship ===
- 1966 - (Soviet Union) Ufa/Moscow - 14th - 9pts

== See also ==
- Speedway in Poland
