= Zdzisław Dobrucki =

Polish speedway rider (1944–2021)

- Born: 26 November 1944; Śrem, Poland
- Died: 21 May 2021 (aged 76)
- Nationality: Polish

Career history
- 1963-1978: Unia Leszno

Individual honours
- 1976: Champion of Poland
- 1968, 1969: Polish Junior Champion

Team honours
- 1972: Speedway World Team Cup bronze medal

Zdzisław Dobrucki (26 November 1944 – 21 May 2021) was an international speedway rider from Poland.

== Speedway career ==
Dobrucki finished runner-up in the 1967 Polish Junior Individual Speedway Championship. Nine years later in 1976, he was the Champion of Poland. He won a bronze medal at the Speedway World Team Cup in the 1972 Speedway World Team Cup.

Dobrucki died in 2021.

== World final appearances ==
=== World Team Cup ===
- 1972 - (West Germany) Olching, Olching Speedwaybahn (with Zenon Plech / Henryk Glücklich / Marek Cieślak / Paweł Waloszek) - 3rd - 21pts (3)
