= Paweł Waloszek =

Polish speedway rider (1938–2018)

- Born: 28 April 1938; Świętochłowice, Poland
- Died: 7 September 2018 (aged 80)
- Nationality: Polish

Career history

Poland
- 1954-1956, 1958, 1961-1985: Stal Świętochłowice
- 1957: Gwardia Katowice
- 1959: Legia Warszawa
- 1960: Legia Gdańsk

Great Britain
- 1961: Leicester Hunters

Individual honours
- 1970: World championship silver medal
- 1968: Golden Helmet Winner
- 1968, 1972: European champion

Team honours
- 1965: World Team Cup

Paweł Waloszek (28 April 1938 – 7 September 2018) was a Polish international motorcycle speedway rider. He was second in 1970 Individual Speedway World Championship. He earned 74 caps for the Poland national speedway team and won the 1965 Speedway World Team Cup with them.

== Career ==
Waloszek won the Individual Speedway European Championship twice, in 1968 and 1972. He reached five Individual World Championship finals finishing runner-up at the 1970 Individual Speedway World Championship.

Waloszek also reached the final of the Polish Individual Speedway Championship eighteen times.

Waloszek rode the majority of his career in his native Poland, representing Stal Świętochłowice in a career that lasted 31 years, from 1955 to 1985. He won the bronze medal of the Team Speedway Polish Championship with Śląsk (1972).

Waloszek only rode one season in Great Britain, when he signed for the Leicester Hunters for the 1961 Speedway National League season. He toured the United Kingdom with the Polish national team in 1966 and 1967.

== Honour ==
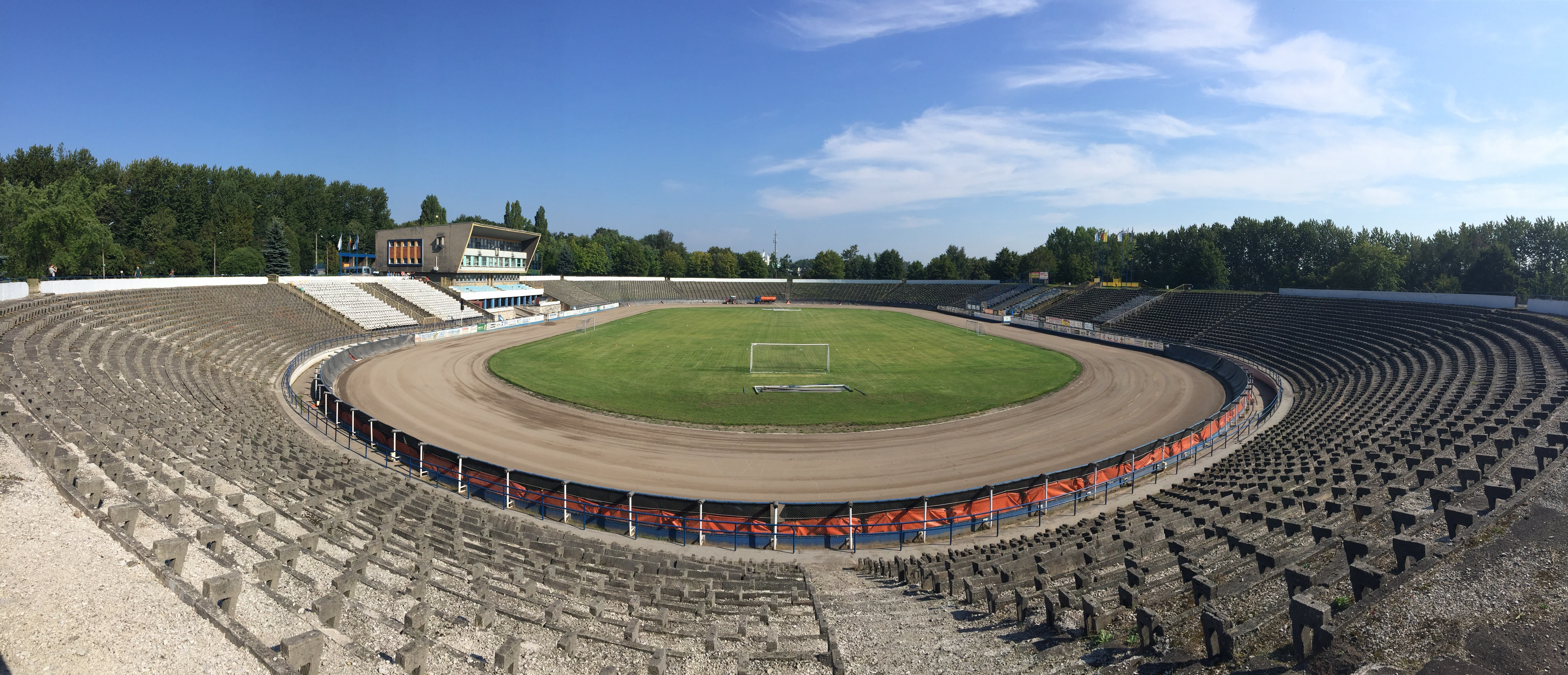
Paweł Waloszek Skałka Stadium

In 2014, the Skałka Stadium was renamed the Paweł Waloszek Skałka Stadium in his honour.

== Results ==
=== World Championships ===
- Individual World Championship
  - 1958 - lost in Continental Semi-Final
  - 1960 - 12th place in Continental Final
  - 1961 - 10th place in Continental Final
  - 1962 - (England) London - 14th place (2 points)
  - 1963 - 11th in Continental Final
  - 1965 - 16th place in European Final
  - 1966 - injury before European Final
  - 1967 - 11th in Continental Final
  - 1968 - (Sweden) Gothenburg - 5th place (10 points)
  - 1969 - 13th in Continental Final
  - 1970 - (Poland) Wrocław - Silver medal (14 points)
  - 1971 - 9th in Continental Final
  - 1972 - (England) London - 8th place (6 points)
  - 1973 - (Poland) Chorzów - 7th place (8 points)
  - 1974 - 12th in Continental Semi-Final
  - 1975 - 15th in Continental Final
- Team World Championship
  - 1962 - (Czechoslovakia) Slaný - Bronze medal

== World Final Appearances ==
=== Individual World Championship ===
- 1962 - (England) London, Wembley Stadium - 14th - 2pts
- 1968 - (Sweden) Gothenburg, Ullevi - 5th - 10pts
- 1970 - (Poland) Wrocław, Olympic Stadium - 2nd - 14pts
- 1972 - (England) London, Wembley Stadium - 8th - 6pts
- 1973 - (Poland) Chorzów, Silesian Stadium - 7th - 8pts

=== World Team Cup ===
- 1962 - (Czechoslovakia) Slaný (with Marian Kaiser / Florian Kapała / Joachim Maj / Mieczysław Połukard) - 3rd - 20pts (2)
- 1968 - (England) London, Wembley Stadium (with Edmund Migoś / Andrzej Wyglenda / Edward Jancarz / Henryk Glücklich) - 3rd - 19pts (1)
- 1970 - (England) London, Wembley Stadium (with Antoni Woryna / Jan Mucha / Edmund Migoś / Henryk Glücklich) - 3rd - 20pts (2)
- 1971 - (Poland) Wrocław, Olympic Stadium (with Henryk Glücklich / Antoni Woryna / Edward Jancarz / Andrzej Wyglenda) - 3rd - 19pts (5)
- 1972 - (West Germany) Olching, Olching Speedwaybahn (with Zenon Plech / Henryk Glücklich / Marek Cieślak / Zdzisław Dobrucki) - 3rd - 21pts (5)
- 1973 - (England) London, Wembley Stadium (with Edward Jancarz / Zenon Plech / Jerzy Szczakiel) - 4th - 8pts (1)

== Polish competitions ==
- Individual Polish Championship
  - 1969 - Rybnik - Runner-up
  - 1972 - Bydgoszcz - Runner-up
  - 1975 - Częstochowa - Bronze medal
- Team Polish Championship
  - 1959 - Bronze medal
  - 1960 - Runner-up
  - 1969 - Runner-up
  - 1970 - Runner-up
  - 1972 - Bronze medal
  - 1973 - Runner-up
- Golden Helmet
  - 1962 - 4th place (66 pts)
  - 1963 - 4th place (55 pts)
  - 1964 - 5th place (48 pts)
  - 1965 - 4th place (66 pts)
  - 1966 - Runner-up
  - 1967 - 5th place (58 pts)
  - 1968 - Winner (74 pts)
  - 1969 - 5th place (59 pts)
  - 1970 - Runner-up (71 pts)
  - 1971 - Runner-up (60 pts)
  - 1972 - 5th place (63 pts)
  - 1973 - 5th place (59 pts)
  - 1974 - 9th place (33 pts)
  - 1975 - 6th place (51 pts)
  - 1976 - 15th place (11 pts)

== See also ==
- Speedway in Poland
- Poland national speedway team
