= Kolejarz Rawicz =

Motorcycle speedway club

Kolejarz Rawicz (nickname the Bears)
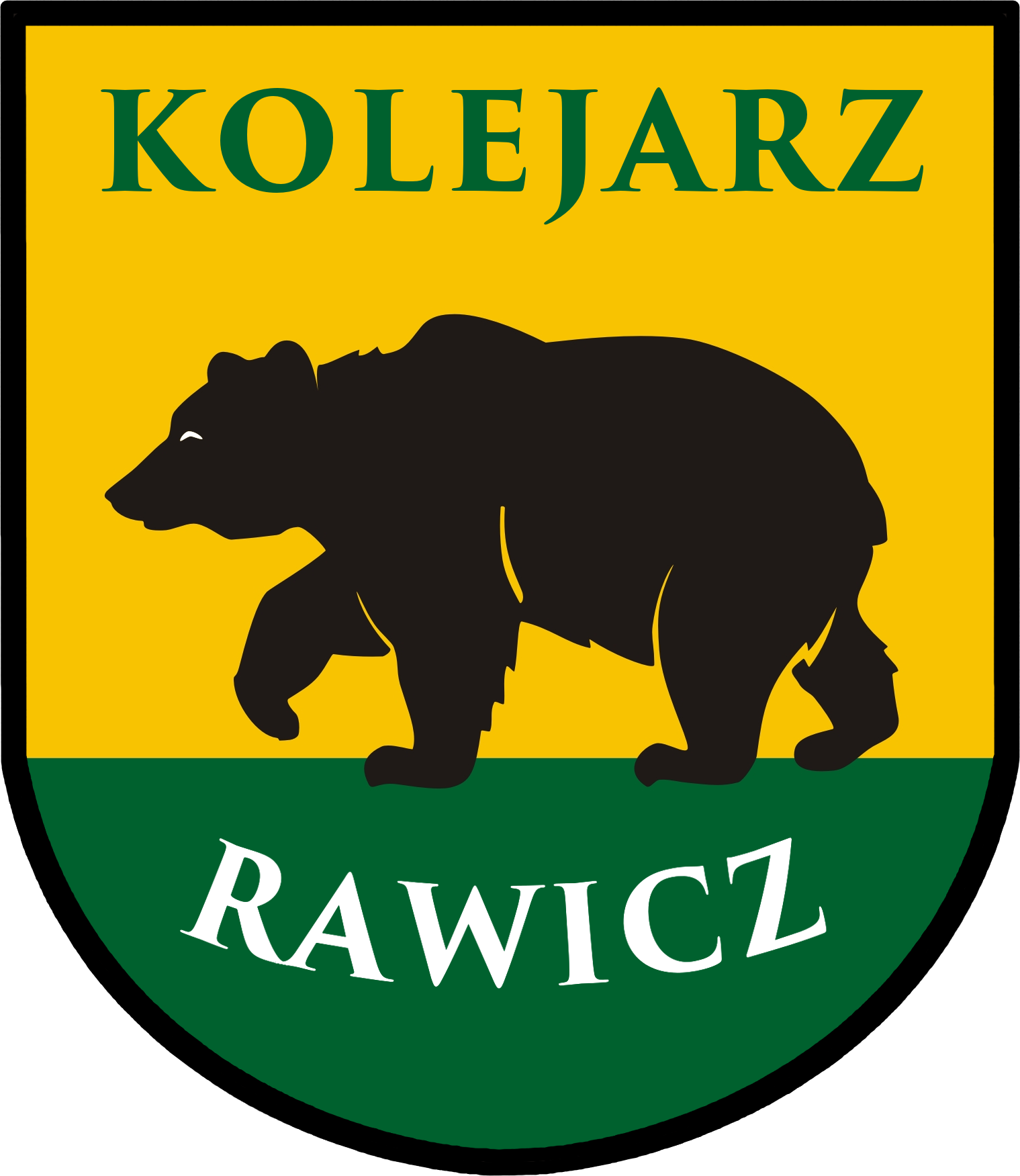

Club information
- Track address: Florian Kapała Stadium; St. Peaceful 1; 63-900 Rawicz
- Country: Poland
- Founded: 1948 (re-formed 1996)
- Team manager: Adam Skórnicki
- League: 2. Liga

Club facts
- Nickname: The Bears
- Track size: 330 metres (360 yd)

Major team honours
Team Speedway Polish Championship silver medal	1955
Team Speedway Polish Championship bronze medal	1954
2. Liga champions	2000, 2007, 2012

Kolejarz Rawicz (Railwayman Rawicz) is a motorcycle speedway team based in Rawicz, Poland. They currently race in the Polish Speedway Second League (2. Liga).

== History ==
The club competed in the inaugural 1948 Polish speedway season, under the name of Motoklub Rawicz.

The club's first team honour was winning the bronze medal in the Team Speedway Polish Championship in 1954 and the following season they went one better after winning the silver medal in 1955. Their leading rider Florian Kapała won the Polish Individual Speedway Championship in 1953 and 1956.

The club was disbanded after the 1959 season and was not reformed until 1996.

The club later won the Polish Speedway Second League three times in 2000, 2007 and 2012.

In 2008, the club renamed their stadium to the Florian Kapała Stadium, named after a former rider Florian Kapała. The stadium has a capacity of 7,000 and the speedway track is 330 metres long.

== Teams ==
=== 2023 team ===
- (England) Scott Nicholls
- (Denmark) Hans Andersen
- (Poland) Damian Dróżdż
- (Poland) Nikodem Bartoch
- (Poland) Tomasz Orwat
- (Australia) Ryan Douglas
- (England) Drew Kemp
- (Australia) Jye Etheridge
- (France) Steven Goret
- (Poland) Damian Baliński
- (Poland) Kacper Klosok
- (Poland) Hubert Gasior
- (Poland) Kacper Klimek
- (Poland) Franciszek Majewski
- (Poland) Blazej Wypior

=== Previous teams ===
Extended content

2022 team

- (Poland) Daniel Kaczmarek
- (Poland) Damian Dróżdż
- (Australia) Josh Pickering
- (Australia) Ryan Douglas
- (England) Tom Brennan
- (Australia) Sam Masters
- (Poland) Kacper Klosok
- (Poland) Krzystof Sadurski
- (Poland) Damian Baliński
- (Poland) Wiktor Przyjemski

== Notable riders ==
- (Poland) Florian Kapała
