= Start Gniezno =

Polish motorcycle speedway team

Club information
- Track address: Stadion Startu Gniezno ul. Wrzesińska 25; Gniezno
- Country: Poland
- Founded: 1952; 2004 (refounded); 2016 (refounded)
- Team manager: Tomasz Fajfer
- League: 1. Liga
- Website: Official website

Club facts
- Colours: Red and Black
- Track size: 348 metres (381 yd)
- Track record time: 63.50
- Track record date: 4 April 2022
- Track record holder: Peter Kildemand

Major team honours
Team championship bronze medal	1980
Second tier	1958, 1979, 1986, 1995, 2012
Third tier	2005, 2008

Start Gniezno is a Polish motorcycle speedway team based in Gniezno who currently race in 1. Liga.

== History ==
=== 1958 to 1999 ===
Speedway in Gniezno appeared during the inaugural 1948 Polish speedway season, a team called Unia Gniezno competed in the regional Third League. However, it only lasted the one season and it was not until 1956 that Start Gniezno started riding.

The team won their first honours in 1958, after winning the second division.

In 1980, the team won the bronze medal in the Team Speedway Polish Championship. Riders included Eugeniusz Błaszak, Leon Kujawski and Jan Puk. Krzysztof Cegielski earned a silver medal in the Polish Individual Speedway Championship during the 2002 Polish speedway season.

=== 2000 to present ===
When the Ekstraliga was introduced in 2000, Gniezno were in the 1. Liga.

The club was initially part the multi-sports club with the prefix SKS, before disbanding and being reformed as TŻ (Towarzystwo Żużlowe; Polish: Speedway Association) in 2004 as an independent club and after another bankruptcy reformed once again under the prefix GTM (Gnieźnieńskie Towarzystwo Motorowe; Polish: Gniezno Speedway Association).

The team have generally competed in the two lower divisions in recent years, winning the 2. Liga in 2005 and 2008 and 1. Liga in 2012.

== Notable riders ==
- (Poland) Eugeniusz Błaszak
- (Poland) Krzysztof Cegielski

== Teams ==
=== 2023 team ===
- To be announced

=== Previous teams ===
Extended content

2022 squad

- (Denmark) Michael Jepsen Jensen
- (Poland) Ernest Koza
- (Poland) Szymon Szlauderbach
- (Poland) Oskar Fajfer
- (Sweden) Antonio Lindbäck
- (Poland) Marcel Studzinski
- (Poland) Mikolaj Czapla
- (Poland) Jedrzej Chmura
- (Poland) Zbigniew Suchecki

== Honours ==
Competitions	Total	Golden medals		Silver medals		Bronze medals
Competitions	Total	Total	Years	Total	Years	Total	Years
Team (DMP) (since 1948)	1					1	1980
Team U-21 (MDMP) (since 1978)	1					1	1980
Pairs (MPPK) (since 1974)	4			1	1996	3	1979, 1980, 1998
Pairs U-21 (MMPPK) (1980 U-23; since 1983)	4			2	1990, 1998	2	1987, 1999
Individual (IMP) (since 1948)	1			1	2002
Individual U-21 (MIMP) (since 1967)	3			2	1982, 1988	1	1975
Total Polish Championship medals: 14		Gold: 0		Silver: 6		Bronze: 8
Competitions	Total	I place		II place		III place
Competitions	Total	Total	Years	Total	Years	Total	Years
European Club (KPE) (since 1998)	0
Team Cup (DPP) (?)	0
Golden Helmet (ZK) (since 1961)	3			2	1980, 1999	1	1990
Silver Helmet U-21 (SK) (since 1966)	4					4	1975, 1998, 2006, 2007
Bronze Helmet U-19 (BK) (1976-81; since 1983)	3			2	1981, 1997	1	1998
