= Florian Kapała =

Polish motorcycle speedway rider

- Born: 28 March 1929; Szymanowo, Poland
- Died: 19 November 2007 (aged 78); Tarnów, Poland
- Nationality: Polish

Career history
- 1948-1950, 1952-1957: Rawicz
- 1951: Ostrów
- 1958-1967: Rzeszów

Individual honours
- 1961: Speedway World Championship finalist
- 1953, 1956, 1961, 1962: Polish champion
- 1961: Continental Final Champion
- 1961: Poland Golden Helmet Winner

Team honours
- 1961: World Team Cup Winner
- 1960, 1961: Polish League Champion

Florian Kapała (1929 - 2007) was an international speedway rider from Poland.

== Speedway career ==
Kapała reached the final of the Speedway World Championship in the 1961 Individual Speedway World Championship.

Kapała was a four-time Polish champion after he won gold at the Polish Individual Speedway Championship in 1953, 1956, 1961 and 1962. Kapała won the World Team Cup with Poland in 1961.

In 1956, Kapała toured the United Kingdom with the Polish team, which cost £2,000 to organise and was paid by the Polish Motor Club and British authorities. Although he did not ride in the British leagues throughout his career, he nearly signed for Birmingham Brummies in 1957 and was named in the Wimbledon Dons team during the same season. He was working as an ambulance driver in Poland at the time.

In 2008 the year after his death, the Kolejarz Rawicz renamed their stadium to the Florian Kapała Stadium, in honour of him.

== World final appearances ==
=== Individual World Championship ===
- 1959 - (England) London, Wembley Stadium - Reserve - Did not ride
- 1961 – (Sweden) Malmö, Malmö Stadion - 7th - 8pts

=== World Team Cup ===
- 1961 - (Poland) Wrocław, Olympic Stadium (with Marian Kaiser / Henryk Żyto / Mieczysław Połukard / Stanisław Tkocz) - Winner - 32pts (6)
- 1962 - (Czech Republic) Slaný (with Marian Kaiser / Mieczysław Połukard / Joachim Maj / Paweł Waloszek) - 3rd - 20pts (5)
