= Włodzimierz Szwendrowski =

Polish speedway rider

- Born: 5 June 1931; Lublin, Poland
- Died: 9 March 2013 (aged 81)
- Nationality: Polish

Career history
- 1951: Ogniwo Bytom
- 1952–1954: Ogniwo Łódź
- 1955: Sparta Łódź
- 1956, 1961–1962: Tramwajarz Łodź

Individual honours
- 1951, 1955: Polish Champion

Włodzimierz Szwendrowski (1931–2013) was an international speedway rider from Poland.

== Speedway career ==
Szwendrowski was the champion of Poland on two occasions, winning the Polish Individual Speedway Championship in 1951 and 1955.

Although he never rode in Britain during his career, Szwendrowski toured the United Kingdom with the Polish team in 1956, which cost £2,000 to organise and was paid by the Polish Motor Club and British authorities. He was also named in the Wimbledon Dons team during the 1957 season. He was a skiing engineering student in Poland at the time.

In 1957, Szwendrowski's career was brought to a sudden halt after he caused a traffic accident in which a pedestrian was killed. he received a two year prison sentence. He did return to racing riding for Tramwajarz Łodź from 1961 to 1962.

After retiring from racing, Szwendrowski went into coaching, which included a spell in charge of the Motor Lublin team.
