= Edward Kupczyński =

Polish speedway rider (1929–2025)

- Born: 2 July 1929; Lwów, Poland
- Died: 18 July 2025 (aged 96); Gdańsk, Poland
- Nationality: Polish

Career history
- 1950: Związkowiec Warszawa
- 1951–1958: Spójnia/Sparta/Ślęza Wrocław
- 1960–1966: Polonia Bydgoszcz
- 1967–1971: Gwardia Łódź

Individual honours
- 1952: Polish Champion

Edward Kupczyński (2 July 1929 – 18 July 2025) was a Polish international speedway rider.

== Biography ==
Kupczyński was born in Lviv (part of Poland at the time) on 2 July 1929, to a father who was a soldier in the 14th Jazłowiec Uhlan Regiment. The family moved to Wrocław after World War II and lived near to the Olympic Stadium where he first experienced speedway.

Kupczyński was the champion of Poland, winning the Polish Individual Speedway Championship in 1952.

In 1956, Kupczyński toured the United Kingdom with the Polish team, which cost £2,000 to organise and was paid by the Polish Motor Club and British authorities. He returned with the Polish team for another tour in 1958, in addition to reaching the 1958 European Final as part of the 1958 Individual Speedway World Championship.

Kupczyński met his wife Krystyna Kędzierska by the Brda. After retiring from riding, he became a speedway coach for teams such as Polonia, Wybrzeże Gdańsk, and Gwardia Łódź. He died on 18 July 2025, at the age of 96.
