= Tadeusz Teodorowicz =

Polish speedway rider

- Born: 17 June 1931; Vilnius, Poland
- Died: 21 January 1965 (aged 33); Swindon, England
- Nationality: Polish / British

Career history

Poland
- 1950: Gwardia Gdynia
- 1951–1957: Spójnia Wrocław

Great Britain
- 1959-1964: Swindon Robins

Individual honours
- 1963: World final reserve
- 1956: European Championship finalist
- 1964: British Championship finalist

Tadeusz Teodorowicz (1931–1965) also known as Teo was an international speedway rider from Poland and Great Britain. He earned five international caps for the Poland national speedway team.

== Speedway career ==
Teodorowicz rode in the top tier of British Speedway from 1959 to 1964, riding for Swindon Robins. He was capped by both Poland and Great Britain and reached the final of the European Championship in 1956.

Teodorowicz would eventually become a British citizen after escaping and seeking political asylum from the communist East while on a tour of the Netherlands in September 1958. He spent four months in prison before gaining a Dutch passport and then moved to England. In England, he married Liliana Zajecka-Slonina, a local Swindon nurse of Polish origin. In 1963, he finished eighth in the British Championships, sealing a reserve spot at the final of the 1963 Individual Speedway World Championship. The following year he reached the final of the British Speedway Championship in 1964.

Teodorowicz was in the best form of his career at the time and then tragedy struck when he suffered major head trauma in a match while riding for Swindon Robins against West Ham Hammers. The match was held at the West Ham Stadium on 1 September 1964 and Teodorowicz was left with a skull fracture following a crash into the fence, this caused him to go into a coma. He was transferred to a London hospital and then moved to Swindon before he died several months later from Pneumonia, on 21 January 1965.

== World final appearances ==
=== Individual World Championship ===
- 1963 - (England) London, Wembley Stadium - Reserve - Did not ride

== See also ==
- List of rider deaths in motorcycle speedway
