= Warsaw Speedway =

Motorcycle speedway in Warsaw, Poland

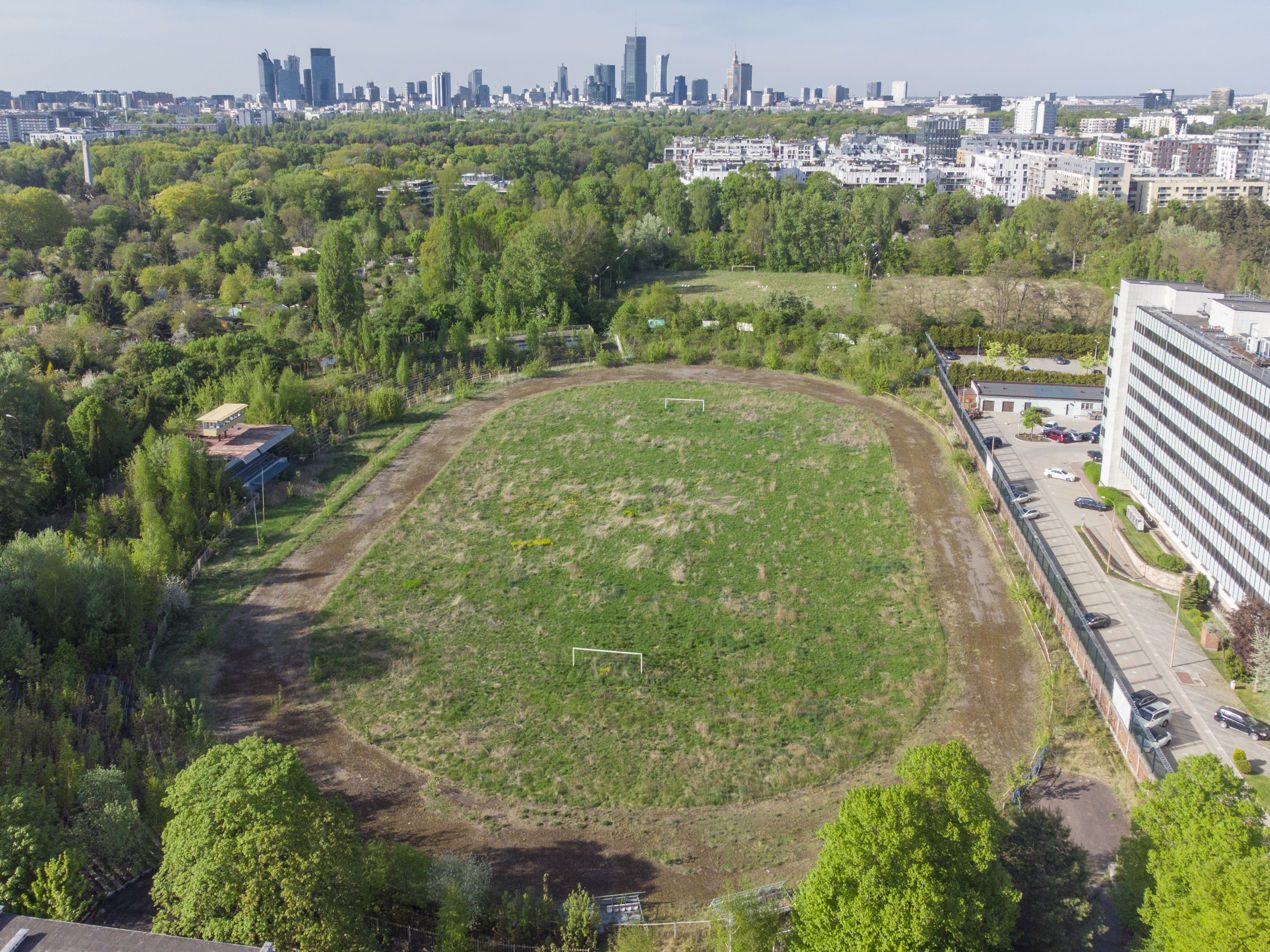
- Site of the former Gwardia Warsaw Stadium

Club information
- Country: Poland

Warsaw Speedway has consisted of several former motorcycle speedway teams and stadia, including the current major venue for the sport at the Stadion Narodowy.

== History ==
=== 1923 to 1939 ===
The origins of speedway in Warsaw began with the founding of two clubs in the city; the first in 1923, when the Polish Motorcycle Club (Polski Klub Motorowy, PKM) were formed. One of its founders was Witold Rychter and the club's members took part in motorcycle and car competitions throughout the interwar period. The second club created in Warsaw was in late 1929, when the Legia Warsaw (sports club) created a motorcycle section, officially celebrating its anniversary on 8 December. The first speedway was raced on 9 November 1930 at the Polish Army Stadium. The progression of speedway in Poland was halted by World War II.

=== 1948 to 1959 ===
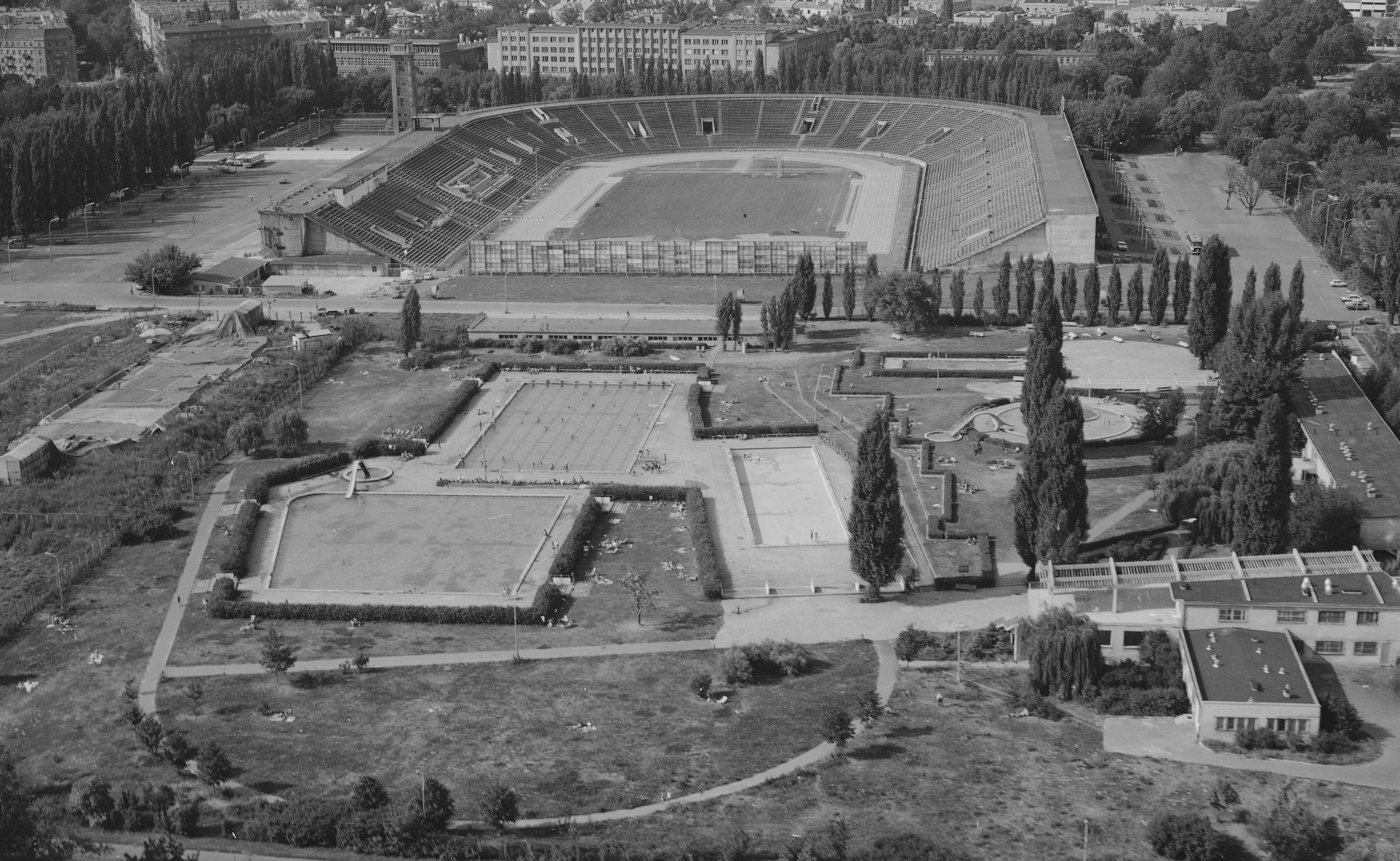
Stadion RKS Skra

It was not until 1948 that the first league season of speedway in Poland was held. The 1948 Polish speedway season contained both PKM Warszawa and Legia Warszawa, in addition to a third club called OM TUR Okęcie Warszawa (the speedway section of the Workers' Sports Club Okęcie Warszawa), who raced at Stadion RKS Skra. The team of PKM Warszawa, consisting of Jan Wąsikowski, Jerzy Dąbrowski, Stanisław Brun and Mieczysław Chlebicz, were crowned the first winners of the Team Speedway Polish Championship.

The following year in 1949, the Okęcie speedway merged with the Skra-Związkowiec Warszawa speedway section and went on to win the silver medal in the 1949 Polish speedway season. PKM competing as PKM Ogniwo Warszawa finished 5th and Legia did not compete.

After the 1950 season the speedway leagues were re-organised, which resulted in PKM Warszawa being dissolved and Skra-Związkowiec becoming Budowlani Warszawa. Legia returned in 1951 under the name of CWKS Warszawa (the Central Military Sports Club of the Polish Army) but was then relocated to Wrocław. From 1952 to 1954, only Budowlani represented Warsaw before CWKS Warszawa returned for the 1955 season.

In 1957, CWKS reverted to the name Legia Warszawa and Budowlani reverted to the name Skra Warszawa. Legia also celebrated their first Polish champion in Marian Kaiser, before winning the bronze medal in 1959.

The 1959 season turned out to be the last season of league speedway participation by any Warsaw club for 40 years because both Legia and Skra were dissolved under different circumstances. Legia merged with LPŻ Neptun Gdańsk but remained in Gdańsk and Skra was disbanded.

The only speedway in Warsaw was the continuation of the qualifying rounds of the Speedway World Championship at the Polish Army Stadium in 1961, 1962 and 1964 (it had previously held rounds in (1956, 1957 and 1958). At the end of 1987, the speedway track was removed from the stadium.

=== 2000 to 2003 ===
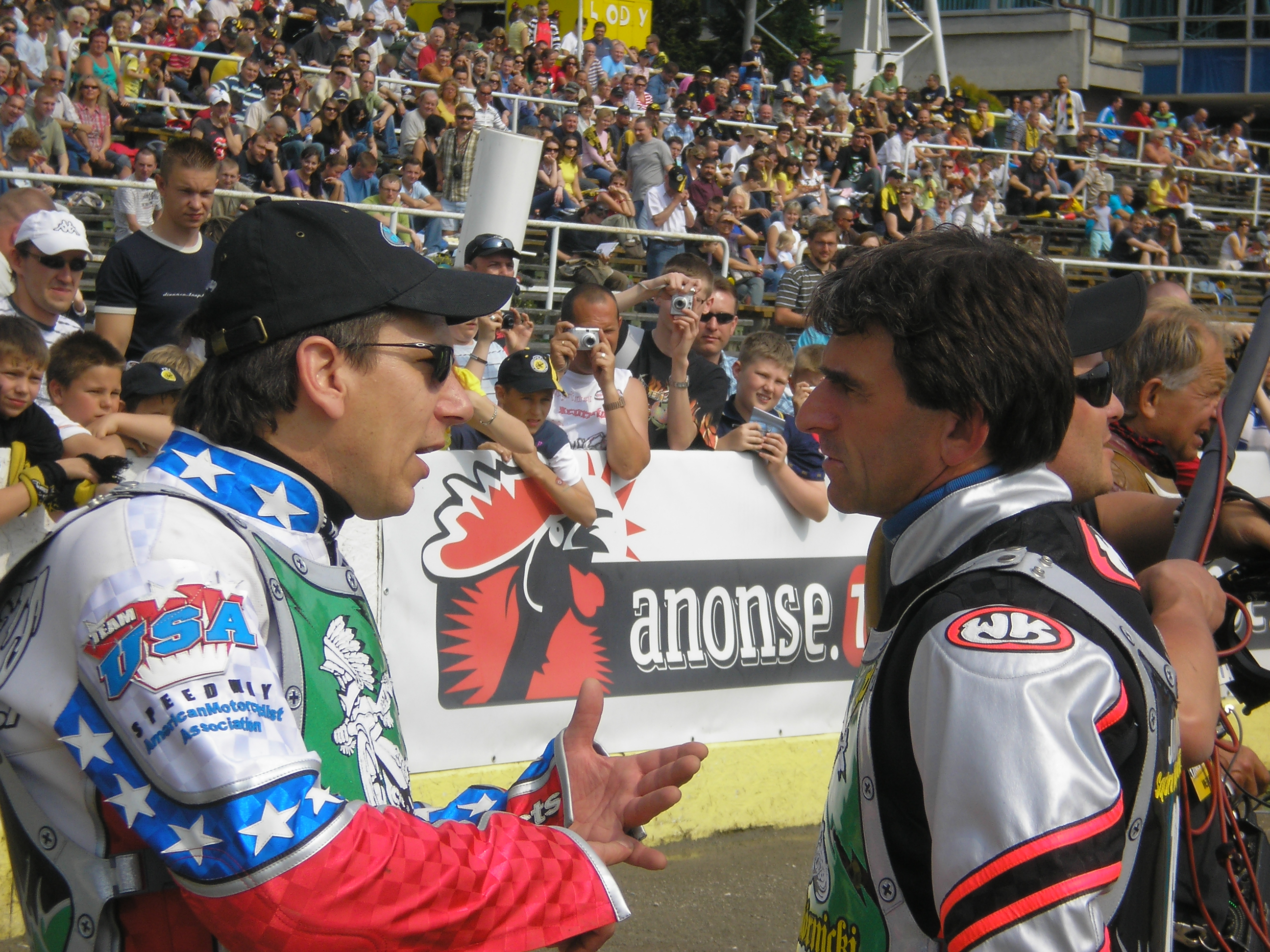
Sam Ermolenko (l) and Roman Jankowski (r)

Forty years after the last league speedway in Warsaw, later the Gwardia Warsaw sports club introduced a speedway section and a team by the name of WSŻ Gwardia Warszawa entered the 2000 Polish speedway season in the Polish Speedway Second League, racing at the Gwardia Warsaw Stadium. The following season in 2001, the Warsaw Speedway Society (Warszawskie Towarzystwo Żużlowe) took over the club and ran as WTŻ Warszawa before yet another change for the 2002 season, when the Warsaw Motor Club ran as WKM Warszawa.

The 2002 season resulted in promotion to 1. Liga. The promotion seemed inevitable because the club had signed famous names, such as former world champion Sam Ermolenko, in addition to former international riders Andy Smith, Craig Boyce and Roman Jankowski. The 2003 1.Liga season was a disaster, WKM Warszawa ending the campaign bottom of the table with just four points and then disbanding.

=== 2015 to present ===
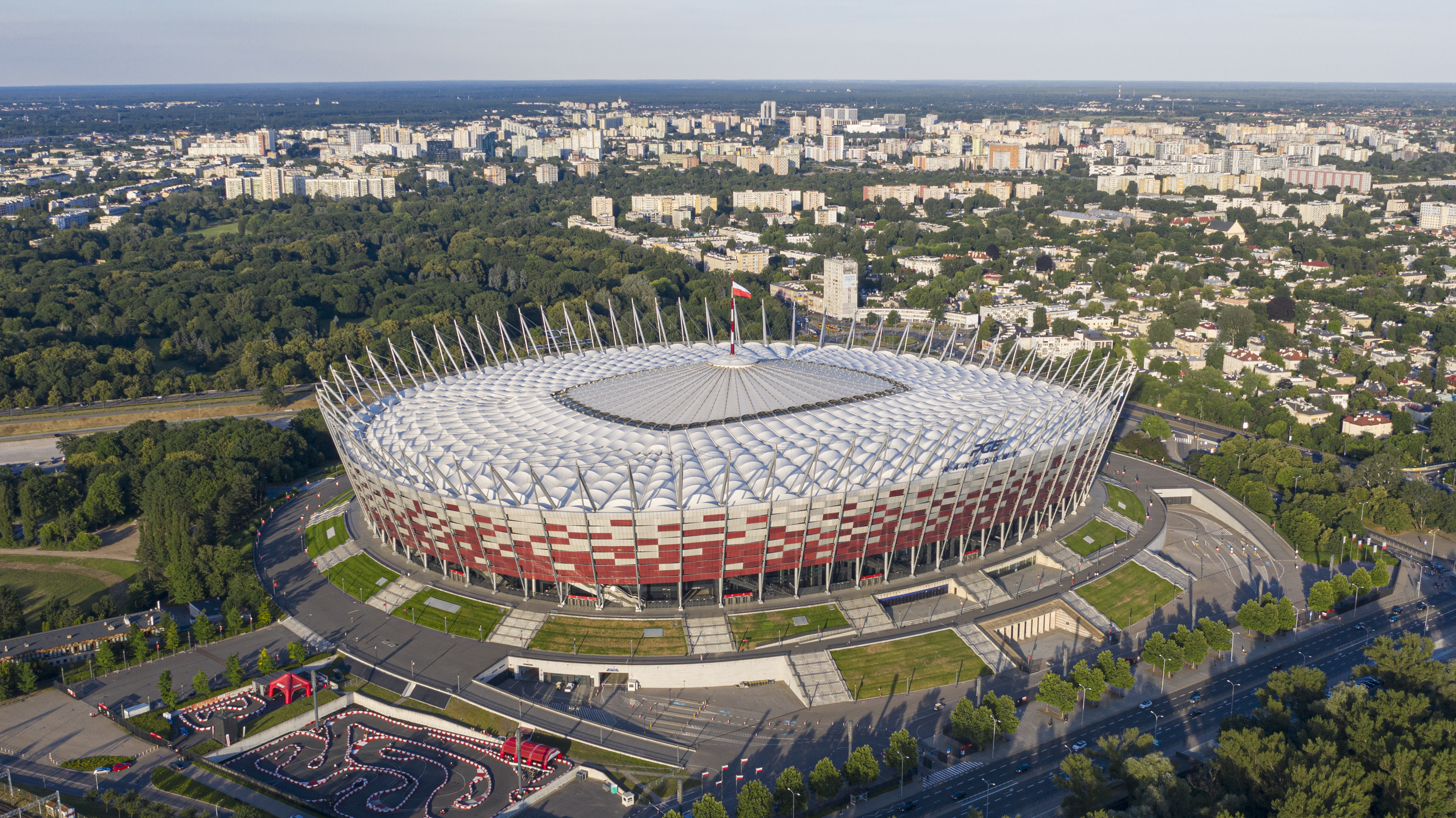
The National Stadium in Warsaw hosts the Speedway Grand Prix of Poland

In 2015, the Speedway Grand Prix of Poland, which is part of the Speedway World Championship series, was held at the Stadion Narodowy. It has held subsequent rounds in 2016, 2017, 2018, 2019, 2022, 2023 and 2024.
