= Speedway 2. Ekstraliga =

Polish motorcycle speedway competition

Metalkas 2. Ekstraliga
- Formerly: II liga (1948–1999); I liga (2000–2023)
- Sport: Motorcycle speedway
- Founded: 1948; 78 years ago
- Commissioner: Wojciech Stępniewski
- Organizing body: Ekstraliga Żużlowa
- No. of teams: 8 (since 2020)
- Country: Poland; In past also: Germany, Hungary, Latvia
- Most recent champion: Polonia Bydgoszcz (5th title) (2026)
- Most titles: ZKŻ Zielona Góra (8 titles)
- Broadcaster: Poland: CANAL+ SPORT 5
- Sponsor: Metalkas
- Level on pyramid: 2
- Promotion to: Speedway Ekstraliga
- Relegation to: National Speedway League
- Website: ekstraliga.pl/2se

Location of the 2026 Metalkas 2. Ekstraliga teams

The Speedway 2. Ekstraliga (formerly the 1 Liga Żużlowa English: Speedway First League), officially known as Metalkas 2. Ekstraliga for sponsorship reasons, is the second division of motorcycle speedway in Poland. It is below the Speedway Ekstraliga and above the National Speedway League.

== 2027 Metalkas 2. Ekstraliga ==
In 2027 Metalkas 2. Ekstraliga will feature 8 teams.

Club	2026 Position
Włókniarz Częstochowa	▼8 (PGEE)
PSŻ Poznań	2
ROW Rybnik	3
Orzeł Łódź	4
Stal Rzeszów	5
Wilki Krosno	6
Ostrovia Ostrów	7
Wybrzeże Gdańsk	▲1 (KLŻ)

== Past winners of the Polish second division ==
Year	Winner
1948	Polonia Bytom
1949	Gwardia Bydgoszcz
1950	Gwardia Bydgoszcz
1955	Górnik Rybnik
1956	Włókniarz Częstochowa (North); Śląsk Świętochłowice (South)
1957	Stal Rzeszów
1958	Start Gniezno
1959	Stal Rzeszów
1960	Wanda Nowa Huta (East); Sparta Wrocław (West)
1961	Stal Gorzów Wielkopolski
1962	Śląsk Świętochłowice
1963	Unia Tarnów
1963/64	Zielona Góra
1964	Włókniarz Częstochowa
1965	Włókniarz Częstochowa
1965/66	Włókniarz Częstochowa
1966	Unia Leszno
1967	Śląsk Świętochłowice
1967/68	Śląsk Świętochłowice
1968	Śląsk Świętochłowice
1969	Kolejarz Opole
1970	Unia Tarnów
1971	Zielona Góra
1972	Unia Leszno
1973	Sparta Wrocław
1974	Kolejarz Opole
1975	Zielona Góra
1976	Motor Lublin
1977	Zielona Góra
1978	Sparta Wrocław
1979	Start Gniezno
1980	Kolejarz Opole
1981	Stal Rzeszów
1982	Motor Lublin
1983	ROW Rybnik
1984	Śląsk Świętochłowice
1985	Unia Tarnów
1986	Start Gniezno
1987	Kolejarz Opole
1988	KM Ostrów Wielkopolski
1989	Motor Lublin
1990	Unia Tarnów
1991	Stal Rzeszów
1992	ROW Rybnik
1993	Wybrzeże Gdańsk
1994	Polonia Piła
1995	Start Gniezno
1996	Unia Leszno
1997	GKM Grudziądz
1998	Sparta Wrocław
1999	Włókniarz Częstochowa
2000	Zielona Góra
2001	Wybrzeże Gdańsk
2002	Zielona Góra
2003	ROW Rybnik
2004	Wybrzeże Gdańsk
2005	Stal Rzeszów
2006	Zielona Góra
2007	Stal Gorzów Wielkopolski
2008	Polonia Bydgoszcz
2009	Unia Tarnów
2010	Stal Rzeszów
2011	Polonia Bydgoszcz
2012	Start Gniezno
2013	Wybrzeże Gdańsk
2014	Stal Rzeszów
2015	Lokomotiv Daugavpils
2016	Lokomotiv Daugavpils
2017	Unia Tarnów
2018	Motor Lublin
2019	ROW Rybnik
2020	KS Toruń
2021	Ostrow Wielkopolski
2022	Wilki Krosno
2023	Zielona Góra
2024	ROW Rybnik
2025	Unia Leszno
2026	Polonia Bydgoszcz
