= 1967 Polish speedway season =

Motorcycle racing competition

The 1967 Polish Speedway season was the 1967 season of motorcycle speedway in Poland.

== Individual ==
=== Polish Individual Speedway Championship ===
The 1967 Individual Speedway Polish Championship final was held on 1 October at Rybnik.

Pos.	Rider	Club	Total	Points
1	Zygmunt Pytko	Unia Tarnów	14	(2,3,3,3,3)
2	Antoni Woryna	ROW Rybnik	13	(3,3,3,1,3)
3	Zygfryd Friedek	Kolejarz Opole	12	(3,1,2,3,3)
4	Paweł Waloszek	Śląsk Świętochłowice	11	(0,2,3,3,3)
5	Andrzej Pogorzelski	Stal Gorzów Wlkp.	10	(u,3,2,3,2)
6	Konstanty Pociejkowicz	Sparta Wrocław	8	(1,1,3,2,1)
7	Andrzej Wyglenda	ROW Rybnik	8	(3,u,2,2,1)
8	Czesław Odrzywolski	Start Gniezno	8	(1,2,1,2,2)
9	Henryk Glücklich	Polonia Bydgoszcz	7	(1,0,2,2,2)
10	Stanisław Tkocz	ROW Rybnik	6	(3,0,1,0,2)
11	Bohdan Jaroszewicz	Sparta Wrocław	6	(2,3,0,1,0)
12	Jan Mucha	Śląsk Świętochłowice	6	(2,2,1,1,0)
13	Joachim Maj	ROW Rybnik	5	(2,2,0,0,1)
14	Jerzy Trzeszkowski	Sparta Wrocław	3	(0,1,0,1,1)
15	Zbigniew Podlecki	Gdańsk	2	(1,1,0,u,–)
16	Jan Malinowski	Stal Rzeszów	1	(0,0,1,0,d)
17	Karol Peszke (res)	ROW Rybnik		(–)
18	Wiktor Jastrzębski (res)	Włókniarz Częstochowa		(–)

=== Golden Helmet ===
The 1967 Golden Golden Helmet (Polish: Turniej o Złoty Kask, ZK) organised by the Polish Motor Union (PZM) was the 1967 event for the league's leading riders.

Calendar

Date	Venue	Winner
14 April	Rzeszów	Wyglenda
2 June	Rybnik	Woryna
9 June	Częstochowa	Pogorzelski
30 June	Poznań	Woryna
7 July	Gdańsk	Wyglenda
28 July	Tarnów	S Tkocz
8 September	Bydgoszcz	Glücklich
28 September	Ostrów Wielkopolski	Glücklich

Final classification

Pos.	Rider	Club	Total	Points
1	Antoni Woryna	ROW Rybnik	77	14,15,4,15,11,8,6,14
2	Henryk Glücklich	Polonia Bydgoszcz	62	4,6,11,5,9,9,12,15
3	Andrzej Wyglenda	ROW Rybnik	61	15,13,5,9,15,–,4,–
4	Andrzej Pogorzelski	Stal Gorzów Wlkp.	59	–,–,13,7,10,7,12,10
5	Paweł Waloszek	Śląsk Świętochłowice	58	6,11,8,9,7,12,6,11
6	Konstanty Pociejkowicz	Sparta Wrocław	55	7,5,8,9,0,8,12,11
7	Joachim Maj	ROW Rybnik	54	4,11,9,9,5,7,10,8
8	Stanisław Tkocz	ROW Rybnik	53	8,8,0,9,6,13,6,9
9	Zbigniew Podlecki	Wybrzeże Gdańsk	52	7,6,10,11,9,–,9,–
10	Jerzy Trzeszkowski	Sparta Wrocław	48	8,10,5,8,11,0,6,5
11	Edmund Migoś	Stal Gorzów Wlkp.	47	–,5,9,6,10,11,4,6
12	Marian Rose	Stal Toruń	46	7,–,–,5,8,12,10,4
13	Wiktor Jastrzębski	Włókniarz Częstochowa	37	3,4,8,8,9,6,0,–
14	Kazimierz Bentke	Unia Leszno	35	4,3,8,6,–,3,6,8
15	Stanisław Rurarz	Włókniarz Częstochowa	28	6,3,11,2,0,6,–,–

=== Junior Championship ===
- winner - Zbigniew Jąder

=== Silver Helmet ===
- winner - Edward Jancarz

== Team ==
=== Team Speedway Polish Championship ===
The 1967 Team Speedway Polish Championship was the 20th edition of the Team Polish Championship.

KS ROW Rybnik won the gold medal for the sixth consecutive season. The team included Joachim Maj, Antoni Woryna, Andrzej Wyglenda and Stanisław Tkocz.

=== First League ===
Pos	Club	Pts	W	D	L	+/−
1	ROW Rybnik	25	12	1	1	+248
2	Wybrzeże Gdańsk	17	8	1	5	+22
3	Sparta Wrocław	16	8	0	6	+45
4	Stal Gorzów Wielkopolski	14	7	0	7	+14
5	Stal Rzeszów	14	7	0	7	–11
6	Włókniarz Częstochowa	10	5	0	9	–143
7	Polonia Bydgoszcz	8	4	0	10	–73
8	Unia Tarnów	8	4	0	10	–102

=== Second League ===
Pos	Club	Pts	W	D	L	+/−
1	Śląsk Świętochłowice	32	16	0	2	+361
2	Unia Leszno	32	16	0	2	+355
3	Kolejarz Opole	20	10	0	8	+96
4	Zgrzeblarki Zielona Góra	20	10	0	8	–53
5	Gwardia Łódź	18	9	0	9	+9
6	Stal Toruń	15	7	1	10	–124
7	Start Gniezno	14	7	0	11	–81
8	Motor Lublin	14	7	0	11	–118
9	Karpaty Krosno	11	5	1	12	–217
10	Polonia Piła	4	2	0	16	–228
