= 1966 Polish speedway season =

Motorcycle racing competition

The 1966 Polish Speedway season was the 1966 season of motorcycle speedway in Poland.

== Individual ==
=== Polish Individual Speedway Championship ===
The 1966 Individual Speedway Polish Championship was held on 2 October at Rybnik.

Pos.	Rider	Club	Total	Points
1	Antoni Woryna	Rybnik	15	(3,3,3,3,3)
2	Marian Rose	Toruń	13	(3,2,2,3,3)
3	Andrzej Pogorzelski	Gorzów Wlkp.	12	(3,2,3,2,2)
4	Joachim Maj	Rybnik	10	(2,0,2,3,3)
5	Kazimierz Bentke	Leszno	10	(3,2,3,0,2)
6	Henryk Glücklich	Bydgoszcz	9	(1,3,3,1,1)
7	Andrzej Wyglenda	Rybnik	9	(0,3,2,3,1)
8	Jan Tkocz	Gdańsk	9	(2,1,2,2,2)
9	Jerzy Trzeszkowski	Wrocław	8	(1,1,1,2,3)
10	Czesław Odrzywolski	Gniezno	7	(2,0,1,2,2)
11	Bohdan Jaroszewicz	Wrocław	6	(1,3,1,0,1)
12	Bronisław Rogal	Gorzów Wlkp.	5	(2,2,0,1,0)
13	Andrzej Mazur	Lublin	3	(0,0,1,1,1)
14	Wiktor Jastrzębski	Częstochowa	2	(1,1,0,0,0)
15	Stanisław Rurarz	Częstochowa	2	(0,1,0,1,0)
16	Jan Kolber	Rzeszów	0	(0,0,0,0,–)
17	Stanisław Tkocz (res)	Rybnik	ns	

=== Golden Helmet ===
The 1966 Golden Golden Helmet (Polish: Turniej o Złoty Kask, ZK) organised by the Polish Motor Union (PZM) was the 1966 event for the league's leading riders.

Calendar

Date	Venue	Winner
15 April	Zielona Góra	Podlecki
22 April	Poznań	Trzeszkowski
17 June	Bydgoszcz	Waloszek
1 July	Nowa Huta, Kraków	Pogorzelski
14 July	Poznań	Waloszek
26 August	Rybnik	Wyglenda
16 September	Gorzów Wielkopolski	Pogorzelski

Final classification

Pos.	Rider	Club	Total	Points
1	Andrzej Pogorzelski	Gorzów Wlkp.	64	(9,12,14,14,10,12,12)
2	Paweł Waloszek	ŚwiętochłowiceToruń	59	(8,10,15,11,15,x,x)
3	Andrzej Wyglenda	Rybnik	52	(11,7,4,10,9,15,6)
4	Zbigniew Podlecki	Gdańsk	51	(12,11,8,10,10,x,x)
5	Joachim Maj	Rybnik	51	(11,9,10,x,8,11,10)
6	Marian Rose	Toruń	49	(9,10,11,x,x,9,10)
7	Antoni Woryna	Rybnik	48	(x,x,7,7,14,11,9)
8	Konstanty Pociejkowicz	Wrocław	48	(0,10,x,14,9,7,8)
9	Jan Mucha	Świętochłowice	44	(9,8,8,10,9,x,x)
10	Stanisław Tkocz	Rybnik	41	(10,4,3,9,8,10,x)
11	Marian Kaiser	Gdańsk	39	(10,9,4,5,11,1,x)
12	Edmund Migoś	Gorzów Wlkp.	39	(8,8,8,4,5,10,4)
13	Jerzy Padewski	Gorzów Wlkp	38	(0,3,10,6,x,7,12)
14	Jerzy Trzeszkowski	Wrocław	38	(7,12,2,10,3,3,6)
15	Stanisław Skowron	Opole	28	(6,6,1,4,5,x,7)

=== Silver Helmet ===
- winner - Zygfryd Friedek

== Team ==
=== Team Speedway Polish Championship ===
The 1966 Team Speedway Polish Championship was the 19th edition of the Team Polish Championship.

KS ROW Rybnik won the gold medal for the fifth consecutive season. The team included Joachim Maj, Antoni Woryna, Andrzej Wyglenda and Stanisław Tkocz.

=== First League ===
Pos	Club	Pts	W	D	L	+/−
1	ROW Rybnik	24	12	0	2	+233
2	Stal Gorzów Wielkopolski	21	10	1	3	+188
3	Stal Rzeszów	17	8	1	5	+50
4	Wybrzeże Gdańsk	16	8	0	6	+22
5	Sparta Wrocław	15	7	1	6	–43
6	Polonia Bydgoszcz	13	6	1	7	–18
7	Śląsk Świętochłowice	6	3	0	11	–143
8	Zgrzeblarki Zielona Góra	0	0	0	14	–289

=== Second League ===
Pos	Club	Pts	W	D	L	+/−
1	Unia Leszno	30	15	0	5	+193
2	Włókniarz Częstochowa	28	14	0	6	+181
3	Kolejarz Opole	28	14	0	6	+124
4	Unia Tarnów	26	13	0	7	+119
5	Stal Toruń	25	12	1	7	+84
6	Motor Lublin	22	11	0	9	–163
7	Polonia Piła	18	9	0	11	–169
8	Start Gniezno	17	8	1	11	–70
9	Karpaty Krosno	10	5	0	15	–299

=== Two year tables ===
An additional award was given to the team that topped the league tables over a two-year period.

First League 1965-66

Pos	Club	Pts	W	D	L	+/−
1	ROW Rybnik	50	25	0	3	+500
2	Stal Gorzów Wielkopolski	40	19	2	7	+276
3	Wybrzeże Gdańsk	33	16	1	11	+93
4	Stal Rzeszów	33	16	1	11	+67
5	Sparta Wrocław	29	13	3	12	–33
6	Polonia Bydgoszcz	19	9	1	18	–108
7	Śląsk Świętochłowice	16	8	0	20	–224
8	Zgrzeblarki Zielona Góra	4	2	0	26	–571

Second League 1965-66

Pos	Club	Pts	W	D	L	+/−
1	Włókniarz Częstochowa	48	24	0	8	+472
2	Unia Tarnów	45	22	1	9	+252
3	Kolejarz Opole	43	21	1	10	+259
4	Unia Leszno	41	20	1	11	+165
5	Stal Toruń	41	19	3	10	+155
6	Motor Lublin	20	10	0	22	–235
7	Karpaty Krosno	20	10	0	22	–248
8	Polonia Piła	18	8	2	22	–347
9	Start Gniezno	12	6	0	26	–473
