= 1963 Polish speedway season =

Motorcycle racing competition

The 1963 Polish Speedway season was the 1963 season of motorcycle speedway in Poland.

== Individual ==
=== Polish Individual Speedway Championship ===
The 1963 Individual Speedway Polish Championship was held on 8 September at Rybnik.

| Pos. | Rider | Club | Total | Points |
|---|---|---|---|---|
| 1 | Henryk Żyto | Leszno | 15 | (3,3,3,3,3) |
| 2 | Joachim Maj | Rybnik | 13 | (2,2,3,3,3) |
| 3 | Marian Kaiser | Gdańsk | 12 | (3,1,2,3,3) |
| 4 | Stanisław Tkocz | Rybnik | 10 | (2,u,3,2,3) |
| 5 | Marian Spychała | Rzeszów | 10 | (3,3,2,1,1) |
| 6 | Konstanty Pociejkowicz | Wrocław | 9 | (1,3,u,3,2) |
| 7 | Andrzej Wyglenda | Rybnik | 9 | (2,2,1,2,2) |
| 8 | Stanisław Rurarz | Częstochowa | 7 | (0,1,3,2,1) |
| 9 | Jan Mucha | Świętochłowice | 7 | (1,3,1,2,0) |
| 10 | Paweł Waloszek | Świętochłowice | 7 | (2,2,0,1,2) |
| 11 | Kazimierz Bentke | Leszno | 6 | (d,2,2,w,2) |
| 12 | Antoni Woryna | Rybnik | 5 | (3,1,1,d,d) |
| 13 | Zygmunt Pytko | Tarnów | 4 | (1,1,2,0,d) |
| 14 | Zbigniew Podlecki | Gdańsk | 1 | (d,0,d,0,1) |
| 15 | Jerzy Trzeszkowski | Wrocław | 1 | (d,0,d,1,0) |
| 16 | Rajmund Świtała | Bydgoszcz | 0 | (u) |
| 17 | Stefan Kępa (res) | Rzeszów | | (0,1,1,0) |

=== Golden Helmet ===
The 1963 Golden Golden Helmet (Polish: Turniej o Złoty Kask, ZK) organised by the Polish Motor Union (PZM) was the 1963 event for league's leading riders.

Calendar

| Date | Venue | Winner |
|---|---|---|
| 27 IV | Gorzów Wlkp. | Stanisław Tkocz (Rybnik) |
| 25 V | Rybnik | Stanisław Tkocz (Rybnik) |
| 8 VI | Leszno | Joachim Maj (Rybnik) |
| 6 VII | Bydgoszcz | Florian Kapała (Rzeszów) |
| 27 VII | Świętochłowice | Joachim Maj (Rybnik) |
| 21 IX | Wrocław | Joachim Maj (Rybnik) |

Final classification Note: Result from final score was subtracted with one the weakest events.

| Pos. | Rider | Club | Total | GOR | RYB | LES | BYD | ŚWI | WRO |
|---|---|---|---|---|---|---|---|---|---|
| 1 | Joachim Maj | Górnik Rybnik | 68 | 9 | 11 | 14 | 13 | 15 | 15 |
| 2 | Stanisław Tkocz | Górnik Rybnik | 66 | 15 | 15 | 8 | 12 | 11 | 13 |
| 3 | Henryk Żyto | Unia Leszno | 55 | 11 | 10 | 10 | 9 | 13 | 11 |
| 4 | Paweł Waloszek | Śląsk Świętochłowice | 55 | 10 | 13 | 9 | - | 14 | 9 |
| 5 | Antoni Woryna | Górnik Rybnik | 54 | - | 9 | 12 | 12 | 10 | 11 |
| 6 | Marian Kaiser | Wybrzeże Gdańsk | 47 | 10 | 9 | 12 | 6 | 10 | - |
| 7 | Bronisław Rogal | Stal Gorzów Wlkp. | 38 | 10 | 5 | 8 | 7 | 3 | 8 |
| 8 | Andrzej Pogorzelski | Gorzów Wlkp. | 30 | 9 | 4 | 2 | 6 | - | 9 |
| 9 | Stanisław Rurarz | Włókniarz Częstochowa | 27 | 3 | 8 | 6 | 6 | 4 | 3 |
| 10 | Jan Mucha | Śląsk Świętochłowice | 25 | 0 | 6 | 9 | 2 | 6 | 2 |
| 11 | Stefan Kępa | Stal Rzeszów | 22 | 7 | 1 | 1 | 8 | 2 | 4 |
| 12 | Jan Kusiak | Unia Leszno | 21 | 3 | 2 | 7 | 4 | - | 5 |
| 13 | Edmund Migos | Stal Gorzów Wlkp. | 21 | 7 | 1 | 5 | 3 | 3 | 3 |

== Team ==
=== Team Speedway Polish Championship ===
The 1963 Team Speedway Polish Championship was the 16th edition of the Team Polish Championship. Górnik Rybnik won the gold medal for the second consecutive season.

=== First League ===
| Pos | Club | Pts. | W | D | L | +/− |
|---|---|---|---|---|---|---|
| 1 | Górnik Rybnik | 26 | 13 | 0 | 1 | +224 |
| 2 | Stal Rzeszów | 22 | 11 | 0 | 3 | +248 |
| 3 | Sparta Wrocław | 12 | 6 | 0 | 8 | –15 |
| 4 | Unia Leszno | 12 | 6 | 0 | 8 | –75 |
| 5 | Wybrzeże Gdańsk | 12 | 6 | 0 | 8 | –139 |
| 6 | Stal Gorzów Wielkopolski | 10 | 5 | 0 | 9 | –39 |
| 7 | Śląsk Świętochłowice | 10 | 5 | 0 | 9 | –146 |
| 8 | Polonia Bydgoszcz | 8 | 4 | 0 | 10 | –292 |

=== Second League ===
| Pos | Club | Pts. | W | D | L | +/− |
|---|---|---|---|---|---|---|
| 1 | Unia Tarnów | 36 | 18 | 0 | 4 | +381 |
| 2 | Zgrzeblarki Zielona Góra | 36 | 18 | 0 | 4 | +190 |
| 3 | Karpaty Krosno | 31 | 15 | 1 | 6 | +159 |
| 4 | Polonia Piła | 28 | 14 | 0 | 8 | +225 |
| 5 | Włókniarz Częstochowa | 26 | 13 | 0 | 9 | +98 |
| 6 | Stal Toruń | 26 | 13 | 0 | 9 | +72 |
| 7 | Start Gniezno | 21 | 10 | 1 | 11 | +41 |
| 8 | Motor Lublin | 18 | 9 | 0 | 13 | –102 |
| 9 | Kolejarz Opole | 12 | 6 | 0 | 16 | –200 |
| 10 | Wanda Nowa Huta | 10 | 5 | 0 | 17 | –167 |
| 11 | Tramwajarz Łódź | 10 | 5 | 0 | 17 | –436 |
| 12 | Sparta Śrem | 8 | 4 | 0 | 18 | –261 |
