= Continental Speedway final =

Motorcycle speedway final

The Continental final was a motorcycle speedway final sanctioned by the FIM as the qualifying round for the Speedway World Championship between 1976 and 2000.

From 1952 to 1975 it acted as the final qualifier for the Championship round or European final. From 1976 to 1990 it was upgraded in stature and acted as a final qualifier for the World Championship final itself. It was not held from 1991 to 1994. From 1995 to 2001 it acted as a final qualifier for the Speedway Grand Prix or Grand Prix Challenge.

== Editions ==
Year	Venue	Winner	Runner-up	3rd place
1952	(Sweden) Falköping	(Sweden) Rune Sörmander	(Sweden) Olle Nygren	(Sweden) Stig Pramberg
1953	(Sweden) Kumla	(Norway) Basse Hveem	(Sweden) Olle Nygren	(Sweden) Dan Forsberg
1954	(Sweden) Linköping	(Sweden) Ove Fundin	(Sweden) Rune Sörmander	(Sweden) Sune Karlsson
1955	(West Germany) Abensberg	(Austria) Fritz Dirtl	(Austria) Josef Kamper	(Sweden) Georg Duneborn
1956	(West Germany) Oberhausen	(Sweden) Kjell Carlsson	(West Germany) Josef Seidl	(Poland) Andrzej Krzesiński
1957	(Austria) Vienna	(West Germany) Josef Hofmeister	(West Germany) Josef Seidl	(Poland) Stanisław Tkocz
1958	(West Germany) Oberhausen	(Sweden) Joel Jansson	(West Germany) Josef Hofmeister	(West Germany) Josef Seidl
1959	(West Germany) Munich	(West Germany) Josef Hofmeister	(Sweden) Björn Knutson	(Poland) Mieczysław Połukard
1960	(Austria) Vienna	(West Germany) Josef Hofmeister	(Poland) Henryk Żyto	(Poland) Marian Kaiser
1961	(Czechoslovakia) Slaný	(Poland) Florian Kapała	(Soviet Union) Igor Plekhanov	(Poland) Stanisław Tkocz
1962	(Poland) Wrocław	(Poland) Marian Kaiser	(Poland) Paweł Waloszek	(Czechoslovakia) Luboš Tomíček Sr.
1963	(Poland) Wrocław	(Poland) Stanisław Tkocz	(Soviet Union) Boris Samorodov	(Czechoslovakia) Antonín Kasper Sr.
1964	(Czechoslovakia) Slaný	(Soviet Union) Igor Plekhanov	(Czechoslovakia) Jaroslav Volf	(Soviet Union) Boris Samorodov
1965	(Poland) Wrocław	(Poland) Andrzej Wyglenda	(Soviet Union) Igor Plekhanov	(Poland) Andrzej Pogorzelski
1966	(Czechoslovakia) Slaný	(Poland) Andrzej Pogorzelski	(Poland) Antoni Woryna	(Poland) Konstanty Pociejkewicz
1967	(West Germany) Kempten	(Poland) Andrzej Wyglenda	(Poland) Jerzy Trzeszkowski	(Soviet Union) Igor Plekhanov
1968	(Czechoslovakia) Slaný	(Soviet Union) Gennady Kurilenko	(Poland) Paweł Waloszek	(Soviet Union) Vladimir Smirnov
1969	(Soviet Union) Ufa	(Poland) Antoni Woryna	(Poland) Andrzej Wyglenda	(Poland) Edward Jancarz
1970	(West Germany) Abensberg	(East Germany) Hans Jürgen Fritz	(Soviet Union) Valeri Klementiev	(Czechoslovakia) Zdenek Majstr
1971	(Czechoslovakia) Slaný	(Poland) Henryk Glücklich	(Czechoslovakia) Jan Mucha	(Soviet Union) Gennady Kurilenko
1972	(Soviet Union) Cherkessk	(Soviet Union) Viktor Trofimov	(Soviet Union) Viktor Kalmykov	(Soviet Union) Anatoly Kuzmin
1973	(Soviet Union) Leningrad	(Soviet Union) Valery Gordeev	(Soviet Union) Grigory Khlinovsky	(Soviet Union) Vladimir Zapleshny
1974	(Soviet Union) Tolyatti	(Soviet Union) Vladimir Gordeev	(Soviet Union) Mikhail Starostin	(Poland) Zenon Plech
1975	(Soviet Union) Leningrad	(Poland) Edward Jancarz	(Soviet Union) Valery Gordeev	(Soviet Union) Viktor Kalmykov
1976	(Soviet Union) Leningrad	(West Germany) Egon Müller	(Czechoslovakia) Jiří Štancl	(Soviet Union) Valery Gordeev
1977	(Soviet Union) Tolyatti	(Czechoslovakia) Jan Verner	(West Germany) Egon Müller	(Czechoslovakia) Jiří Štancl
1978	(Czechoslovakia) Prague	(West Germany) Hans Wassermann	(Czechoslovakia) Jiří Štancl	(Poland) Marek Cieślak
1979	(West Germany) Pöcking	(West Germany) Christoph Betzl	(Soviet Union) Mikhail Starostin	(Czechoslovakia) Zdeněk Kudrna
1980	(Italy) Lonigo	(Poland) Zenon Plech	(Czechoslovakia) Jiří Štancl	(Czechoslovakia) Aleš Dryml Sr.
1981	(Czechoslovakia) Prague	(West Germany) Egon Müller	(Czechoslovakia) Aleš Dryml Sr.	(Poland) Edward Jancarz
1982	(Poland) Leszno	(Czechoslovakia) Jiří Štancl	(Poland) Edward Jancarz	(Czechoslovakia) Václav Verner
1983	(Poland) Rybnik	(Poland) Zenon Plech	(West Germany) Egon Müller	(Czechoslovakia) Jiří Štancl
1984	(Soviet Union) Rovno	(West Germany) Egon Müller	(West Germany) Karl Maier	(Czechoslovakia) Jiří Štancl
1985	(West Germany) Pöcking	(West Germany) Egon Müller	(Italy) Armando Castagna	(Hungary) Zoltán Adorján
1986	(Austria) Wiener Neustadt	(Soviet Union) Viktor Kuznetsov	(Czechoslovakia) Antonín Kasper Jr.	(Italy) Armando Castagna
1987	(Italy) Lonigo	(West Germany) Gerd Riss	(Poland) Roman Jankowski	(Czechoslovakia) Antonín Kasper Jr.
1988	(Poland) Leszno	(Poland) Zenon Kasprzak	(Hungary) Antal Kocso	(Poland) Roman Jankowski
1989	(Hungary) Debrecen	(Hungary) Zoltán Adorján	(West Germany) Karl Maier	(Czechoslovakia) Roman Matoušek
1990	(West Germany) Norden	(West Germany) Gerd Riss	(Hungary) Zoltán Adorján	(Italy) Armando Castagna
1991–1994	not held			
1995	(Hungary) Miskolc	(Hungary) Zoltán Adorján	(Italy) Stefano Alfonso	(Czech Republic) Antonín Kasper Jr.
1996	(Germany) Abensberg	(Poland) Tomasz Gollob	(Poland) Sławomir Drabik	(Hungary) Zoltán Adorján
1997	(Italy) Lonigo	(Italy) Armando Castagna	(Hungary) Zoltán Adorján	(Czech Republic) Tomáš Topinka
1998	(Hungary) Debrecen	(Czech Republic) Antonín Kasper Jr.	(Czech Republic) Marián Jirout	(Russia) Roman Povazhny
1999	(Poland) Wrocław	(Poland) Rafał Dobrucki	(Poland) Piotr Protasiewicz	(Poland) Sławomir Drabik
2000	(Italy) Lonigo	(Slovenia) Matej Ferjan	(Poland) Piotr Protasiewicz	(Poland) Piotr Świst
2001	(Poland) Gdańsk	(Poland) Sebastian Ułamek	(Czech Republic) Bohumil Brhel	(Poland) Wiesław Jaguś

== See also ==
- Speedway World Championship
- Speedway Grand Prix
- Motorcycle speedway
