= 1968 Polish speedway season =

Motorcycle racing competition

The 1968 Polish Speedway season was the 1968 season of motorcycle speedway in Poland.

== Individual ==
=== Polish Individual Speedway Championship ===
The 1968 Individual Speedway Polish Championship final was held on 15 September at Rybnik.

Pos.	Rider	Club	Total	Points
1	Andrzej Wyglenda	Rybnik	14	(3,3,3,3,2)
2	Edmund Migoś	Gorzów Wlkp.	12+3	(2,2,3,2,3)
3	Edward Jancarz	Gorzów Wlkp.	12+2	(3,3,2,2,2)
4	Andrzej Pogorzelski	Gorzów Wlkp.	11	(2,2,3,3,1)
5	Stanisław Tkocz	Rybnik	10	(0,1,3,3,3)
6	Jerzy Trzeszkowski	Wrocław	9	(1,1,1,3,3)
7	Joachim Maj	Rybnik	9	(2,3,2,1,1)
8	Zbigniew Podlecki	Gdańsk	8	(3,2,0,2,1)
9	Jan Mucha	Świętochłowice	8	(1,3,1,2,1)
10	Jerzy Padewski	Gorzów Wlkp.	7	(3,1,2,1,u)
11	Piotr Bruzda	Wrocław	6	(1,2,0,0,3)
12	Bohdan Jaroszewicz	Wrocław	4	(2,0,2,0,0)
13	Andrzej Tanaś	Tarnów	4	(1,d,0,1,2)
14	Henryk Glücklich	Bydgoszcz	3	(0,1,0,0,2)
15	Paweł Waloszek	Świętochłowice	2	(u,0,1,1,0)
16	Henryk Ciorga	Zielona Góra	1	(w,0,1,0,0)
17	Stanisław Skowron (res)	Opole	ns	
18	Antoni Woryna	Rybnik	ns	

=== Golden Helmet ===
The 1968 Golden Golden Helmet (Polish: Turniej o Złoty Kask, ZK) organised by the Polish Motor Union (PZM) was the 1968 event for the league's leading riders.

Calendar

Date	Venue	Winner
19 IV	Rybnik	Antoni Woryna (Rybnik)
31 V	Wrocław	Jerzy Trzeszkowski (Wrocław)
13 VI	Tarnów	Andrzej Tanaś (Unia Tarnów)
2 VIII	Gdańsk	Konstanty Pociejkowicz (Wrocław)
16 VIII	Toruń	Paweł Waloszek (Świętochłowice)
30 VIII	Gorzów Wlkp.	Paweł Waloszek (Świętochłowice)
13 IX	Ostrów Wlkp.	Andrzej Wyglenda (Rybnik)
27 IX	Bydgoszcz	Paweł Waloszek (Świętochłowice)

Final classification Note: Result from final score was subtracted with two the weakest events.

Pos.	Rider	Club	Total	RYB	WRO	TAR	GDA	TOR	GOR	OST	BYD
1	Paweł Waloszek	Śląsk Świętochłowice	74	12	11	10	7	15	14	-	12
2	Zygmunt Pytko	Unia Tarnów	61	10	2	8	10	12	9	12	-
3	Stanisław Tkocz	ROW Rybnik	58	12	6	14	8	8	8	8	8
4	Joachim Maj	ROW Rybnik	56	12	5	0	9	9	7	8	11
5	Andrzej Wyglenda	ROW Rybnik	55	10	11	6	5	0	9	14	-
6	Konstanty Pociejkowicz	Sparta Wrocław	54	9	12	11	11	4	-	-	7
7	Edmund Migoś	Stal Gorzów Wlkp.	53	3	8	2	10	1	13	8	11
8	Jan Mucha	Śląsk Świętochłowice	53	7	9	12	7	7	10	4	8
9	Henryk Glücklich	Polonia Bydgoszcz	48	7	6	9	5	8	9	2	9
10	Jerzy Padewski	Stal Gorzów Wlkp.	46	3	7	9	5	4	12	9	1
11	Zbigniew Podlecki	Wybrzeże Gdańsk	43	-	8	8	6	8	7	6	0
12	Jerzy Trzeszkowski	Sparta Wrocław	40	3	15	2	10	5	3	-	4
13	Bohdan Jaroszewicz	Sparta Wrocław	36	7	8	2	7	7	4	-	3

=== Junior Championship ===
- winner - Zdzisław Dobrucki

=== Silver Helmet ===
- winner - Piotr Bruzda

== Team ==
=== Team Speedway Polish Championship ===
The 1968 Team Speedway Polish Championship was the 21st edition of the Team Polish Championship.

KS ROW Rybnik won the gold medal for the seventh consecutive season. The team included Joachim Maj, Antoni Woryna, Andrzej Wyglenda and Stanisław Tkocz.

=== First League ===
Pos	Club	Pts	W	D	L	+/−
1	ROW Rybnik	21	10	1	3	+203
2	Stal Gorzów Wielkopolski	19	9	1	4	+115
3	Sparta Wrocław	18	9	0	5	+80
4	Stal Rzeszów	12	6	0	8	–144
5	Polonia Bydgoszcz	11	5	1	8	–39
6	Unia Tarnów	10	5	0	9	–53
7	Włókniarz Częstochowa	10	5	0	9	–124
8	Wybrzeże Gdańsk	9	4	1	9	–38

=== Second League ===
Pos	Club	Pts	W	D	L	+/−
1	Śląsk Świętochłowice	28	14	0	2	+336
2	Unia Leszno	26	13	0	3	+241
3	Motor Lublin	22	11	0	5	+76
4	Kolejarz Opole	18	9	0	7	+13
5	Start Gniezno	16	8	0	8	–40
6	Gwardia Łódź	13	6	1	9	–17
7	Stal Toruń	11	5	1	10	–165
8	Karpaty Krosno	6	3	0	13	–222
9	Zgrzeblarki Zielona Góra	4	2	0	14	–222

=== Two year tables ===
An additional award was given to the team that topped the league tables over a two-year period.

First League 1967-1968

Pos	Club	Pts	W	D	L	+/−
1	ROW Rybnik	46	22	2	4	+451
2	Sparta Wrocław	34	17	0	11	+125
3	Stal Gorzów Wielkopolski	33	16	1	11	+129
4	Wybrzeże Gdańsk	26	12	2	14	–16
5	Stal Rzeszów	26	13	0	15	–155
6	Włókniarz Częstochowa	20	10	0	18	–267
7	Polonia Bydgoszcz	19	9	1	18	–112
8	Unia Tarnów	18	9	0	19	–155

Second League 1967-1968

Pos	Club	Pts	W	D	L	+/−
1	Śląsk Świętochłowice	60	30	0	4	+697
2	Unia Leszno	48	29	0	5	+596
3	Kolejarz Opole	38	19	0	15	+109
4	Motor Lublin	36	18	0	16	–42
5	Gwardia Łódź	31	15	1	18	–8
6	Start Gniezno	30	15	0	19	–121
7	Stal Toruń	26	12	2	20	–289
8	Zgrzeblarki Zielona Góra	24	12	0	22	–275
9	Karpaty Krosno	17	8	1	25	–439
10	Polonia Piła	4	2	0	16	–228
