= 1971 Polish speedway season =

Motorcycle racing competition

The 1971 Polish Speedway season was the 1971 season of motorcycle speedway in Poland.

== Individual ==
=== Polish Individual Speedway Championship ===
The 1971 Individual Speedway Polish Championship final was held on 3 October at Rybnik.

Pos.	Rider	Club	Total	Points
1	Jerzy Gryt	ROW Rybnik	14	(3,3,2,3,3)
2	Jerzy Szczakiel	Kolejarz Opole	13	(1,3,3,3,3)
3	Andrzej Wyglenda	ROW Rybnik	12+3	(3,1,3,3,2)
4	Henryk Glücklich	Polonia Bydgoszcz	12+2	(2,2,3,2,3)
5	Zygfryd Friedek	Kolejarz Opole	11	(3,2,2,2,2)
6	Jan Mucha	Śląsk Świętochłowice	10	(2,3,2,2,1)
7	Edward Jancarz	Stal Gorzów Wlkp.	8	(3,3,1,0,1)
8	Zdzisław Dobrucki	Unia Leszno	7	(2,2,2,d,1)
9	Henryk Żyto	Wybrzeże Gdańsk	6	(0,2,1,3,d)
10	Grzegorz Kuźniar	Stal Rzeszów	6	(1,d,1,1,3)
11	Paweł Waloszek	Śląsk Świętochłowice	5	(0,1,3,1,0)
12	Zbigniew Podlecki	Wybrzeże Gdańsk	5	(2,1,w,0,2)
13	Konstanty Pociejkowicz	Sparta Wrocław	4	(0,w,w,2,2)
14	Marek Cieślak	Włókniarz Częstochowa	4	(1,0,1,1,1)
15	Andrzej Pogorzelski	Stal Gorzów Wlkp.	2	(1,0,0,1,0)
16	Jan Ratajczyk	Zgrzeblarki Z. Góra	1	(0,1,d,0,0)
17	Józef Jarmuła (res)	Śląsk Świętochłowice		(ns)
18	Antoni Woryna (res)	ROW Rybnik		(ns)

=== Golden Helmet ===
The 1971 Golden Golden Helmet (Polish: Turniej o Złoty Kask, ZK) organised by the Polish Motor Union (PZM) was the 1971 event for the league's leading riders.

Calendar

Date	Venue	Winner
16 IV	Gorzów Wlkp.	Paweł Waloszek (Świętochłowice)
22 IV	Opole	Jerzy Szczakiel (Opole)
17 VI	Rybnik	Andrzej Wyglenda (Rybnik)
14 VII	Bydgoszcz	Antoni Woryna (Rybnik)
8 VII	Tarnów	Antoni Woryna (Rybnik)
15 VII	Wrocław	Paweł Waloszek (Świętochłowice)
12 VIII	Świętochłowice	Paweł Waloszek (Świętochłowice)

Final classification Note: Result from final score was subtracted with two the weakest events.

Pos.	Rider	Club	Total	GOR	OPO	RYB	BYD	TAR	WRO	ŚWI
1	Antoni Woryna	ROW Rybnik	62	8	5	12	14	15	10	11
2	Paweł Waloszek	Śląsk Świętochłowice	60	13	8	10	8	6	14	15
3	Jerzy Szczakiel	Kolejarz Opole	52	7	15	12	10	-	8	3
4	Jan Mucha	Śląsk Świętochłowice	51	9	9	3	10	9	9	14
5	Zygfryd Friedek	Kolejarz Opole	50	-	-	11	11	12	6	10
6	Henryk Glücklich	Polonia Bydgoszcz	49	8	7	6	14	8	12	-
7	Jerzy Gryt	ROW Rybnik	47	6	9	7	5	14	7	10
8	Jerzy Trzeszkowski	Sparta Wrocław	46	12	9	8	5	8	9	0
9	Andrzej Wyglenda	ROW Rybnik	40	10	7	14	1	-	-	-
10	Zygmunt Pytko	Unia Tarnów	39	11	9	4	5	10	0	4
	Henryk Żyto	Wybrzeże Gdańsk	39	2	6	5	11	1	7	10
12	Józef Jarmuła	Śląsk Świętochłowice	36	-	5	3	8	7	4	12
13	Piotr Bruzda	Sparta Wrocław	33	10	5	3	1	5	9	4
	Stanisław Kasa	Polonia Bydgoszcz	33	5	5	5	10	8	1	-

=== Junior Championship ===
- winner - Jerzy Wilim

=== Silver Helmet ===
- winner - Zenon Plech & Grzegorz Kuźniar

== Team ==
=== Team Speedway Polish Championship ===
The 1971 Team Speedway Polish Championship was the 1971 edition of the Team Polish Championship.

Polonia Bydgoszcz won the gold medal, which was their first title win since 1955. The team included Henryk Glücklich and Stanisław Kasa.

=== First League ===
Pos	Club	Pts	W	D	L	+/−
1	Polonia Bydgoszcz	19	9	1	4	+43
2	Stal Gorzów Wielkopolski	18	9	0	5	+87
3	ROW Rybnik	16	8	0	6	+124
4	Śląsk Świętochłowice	15	7	1	6	+13
5	Kolejarz Opole	14	7	0	7	+4
6	Sparta Wrocław	14	7	0	7	+29
7	Wybrzeże Gdańsk	10	5	0	9	–123
8	Unia Tarnów	6	3	0	11	–214

=== Second League ===
Pos	Club	Pts	W	D	L	+/−
1	Zgrzeblarki Zielona Góra	24	12	0	2	+193
2	Włókniarz Częstochowa	22	11	0	3	+154
3	Unia Leszno	20	10	0	4	+109
4	Stal Toruń	10	5	0	9	–23
5	Gwardia Łódź	10	5	0	9	–49
6	Motor Lublin	10	5	0	9	–79
7	Stal Rzeszów	10	5	0	9	–93
8	Start Gniezno	6	3	0	11	–212
