= 1970 Polish speedway season =

Motorcycle racing competition

The 1970 Polish Speedway season was the 1970 season of motorcycle speedway in Poland.

== Individual ==
=== Polish Individual Speedway Championship ===
The 1970 Individual Speedway Polish Championship final was held on 27 September at Gorzów.

Pos.	Rider	Club	Total	Points
1	Edmund Migoś	Stal Gorzów Wlkp.	14	(3,3,3,2,3)
2	Andrzej Wyglenda	ROW Rybnik	12	(2,2,3,3,2)
3	Antoni Woryna	ROW Rybnik	11	(3,2,1,2,3)
4	Piotr Bruzda	Sparta Wrocław	10	(3,1,u,3,3)
5	Stanisław Bombik	Kolejarz Opole	10	(3,0,2,3,2)
6	Henryk Glücklich	Polonia Bydgoszcz	9	(0,3,2,3,1)
7	Paweł Waloszek	Śląsk Świętochłowice	9	(2,d,3,1,3)
8	Jerzy Szczakiel	Kolejarz Opole	7	(u,3,3,d,1)
9	Jan Mucha	Śląsk Świętochłowice	7	(1,2,1,1,2)
10	Jerzy Trzeszkowski	Sparta Wrocław	6	(1,3,w,w,2)
11	Jerzy Gryt	ROW Rybnik	6	(2,1,0,2,1)
12	Henryk Żyto	Wybrzeże Gdańsk	6	(w,2,2,1,1)
13	Zbigniew Marcinkowski	Zgrzeblarki Z. Góra	5	(1,1,1,2,0)
14	Jan Tkocz	Wybrzeże Gdańsk	3	(0,1,2,0,0)
15	Ryszard Dziatkowiak	Stal Gorzów Wlkp.	3	(2,w,0,1,u)
16	Marek Cieślak	Włókniarz Częstochowa	1	(0,0,1,0,0)
17	Erwin Brabański (res)	Śląsk Świętochłowice		(–)

=== Golden Helmet ===
The 1970 Golden Golden Helmet (Polish: Turniej o Złoty Kask, ZK) organised by the Polish Motor Union (PZM) was the 1970 event for the league's leading riders.

Calendar

Date	Venue	Winner
14 VI	Leszno	Henryk Glücklich (Bydgoszcz)
19 VI	Świętochłowice	Jan Mucha (Świętochłowice)
26 VI	Rybnik	Antoni Woryna (Rybnik)
3 VII	Bydgoszcz	Andrzej Wyglenda (Rybnik)
10 VII	Gorzów Wlkp.	Andrzej Wyglenda (Rybnik)
31 VII	Opole	Antoni Woryna (Rybnik)
7 VIII	Wrocław	Paweł Waloszek (Świętochłowice)
9 X	Gdańsk	Paweł Waloszek (Świętochłowice)

Final classification Note: Result from final score was subtracted with two the weakest events.

Pos.	Rider	Club	Total	LES	ŚWI	RYB	BYD	GOR	OPO	WRO	GDA
1	Jan Mucha	Śląsk Świętochłowice	72	6	14	12	13	12	8	6	13
2	Paweł Waloszek	Śląsk Świętochłowice	71	9	12	11	6	12	11	12	13
3	Andrzej Wyglenda	ROW Rybnik	68	8	12	9	14	14	5	10	9
4	Antoni Woryna	ROW Rybnik	63	9	5	14	10	8	12	10	5
5	Henryk Glücklich	Polonia Bydgoszcz	58	12	9	3	9	9	6	12	7
6	Jerzy Szczakiel	Kolejarz Opole	58	11	12	8	11	6	7	9	-
7	Zygfryd Friedek	Kolejarz Opole	56	7	7	9	7	10	12	11	-
8	Józef Jarmuła	Śląsk Świętochłowice	54	6	11	10	8	6	6	-	13
9	Stanisław Kasa	Polonia Bydgoszcz	49	10	4	8	9	8	7	7	6
10	Edmund Migoś	Stal Gorzów Wlkp.	49	8	4	5	9	7	9	11	1
11	Zygmunt Pytko	Unia Tarnów	38	7	3	8	3	-	7	10	0
12	Stanisław Skowron	Kolejarz Opole	35	6	4	5	3	0	11	6	-
13	Henryk Żyto	Wybrzeże Gdańsk	34	8	8	4	5	-	5	0	4
14	Jerzy Trzeszkowski	Sparta Wrocław	31	0	7	7	0	5	-	-	12
15	Piotr Bruzda	Sparta Wrocław	29	7	2	2	1	7	5	3	5

=== Junior Championship ===
- winner - Stanisław Kasa

=== Silver Helmet ===
- winner - Zbigniew Marcinkowski

== Team ==
=== Team Speedway Polish Championship ===
The 1970 Team Speedway Polish Championship was the 23rd edition of the Team Polish Championship.

KS ROW Rybnik won the gold medal. The team included Andrzej Wyglenda, Antoni Woryna, Jerzy Gryt and Stanisław Tkocz.

=== First League ===
Pos	Club	Pts	W	D	L	+/−
1	ROW Rybnik	24	12	0	2	+186
2	Śląsk Świętochłowice	21	10	1	3	+184
3	Kolejarz Opole	15	7	1	6	+41
4	Polonia Bydgoszcz	15	7	1	6	+10
5	Stal Gorzów Wielkopolski	15	7	1	6	–12
6	Sparta Wrocław	10	5	0	9	–90
7	Wybrzeże Gdańsk	10	5	0	9	–102
8	Unia Leszno	2	1	0	13	–217

=== Second League ===
Pos	Club	Pts	W	D	L	+/−
1	Unia Tarnów	24	12	0	2	+23
2	Stal Rzeszów	22	11	0	3	+208
3	Zgrzeblarki Zielona Góra	18	9	0	5	+132
4	Motor Lublin	16	8	0	6	+39
5	Włókniarz Częstochowa	14	7	0	7	+43
6	Start Gniezno	9	4	1	9	–153
7	Gwardia Łódź	6	3	0	11	–275
8	Stal Toruń	3	1	1	12	–233
