= 1964 Polish speedway season =

Motorcycle racing competition

The 1964 Polish Speedway season was the 1964 season of motorcycle speedway in Poland.

== Individual ==
=== Polish Individual Speedway Championship ===
The 1964 Individual Speedway Polish Championship was held on 27 September at Rybnik.

Pos.	Rider	Club	Total	Points
1	Andrzej Wyglenda	Rybnik	14	(3,3,3,2,3)
2	Joachim Maj	Rybnik	13 +3	(2,3,2,3,3)
3	Andrzej Pogorzelski	Gorzów Wlkp.	13 +2	(1,3,3,3,3)
4	Stanisław Tkocz	Rybnik	11	(2,3,2,1,3)
5	Zbigniew Podlecki	Gdańsk	9	(3,2,3,1,d)
6	Jerzy Trzeszkowski	Wrocław	9	(2,0,3,2,2)
7	Andrzej Domiszewski	Wrocław	8	(0,2,2,3,1)
8	Marian Rose	Toruń	8	(1,2,d,3,2)
9	Józef Batko	Rzeszów	8	(3,1,1,2,1)
10	Paweł Waloszek	Świętochłowice	7	(3,2,u,d,2)
11	Jan Mucha	Świętochłowice	5	(0,0,2,2,1)
12	Jan Tkocz	Gdańsk	4	(1,1,1,1,0)
13	Mieczysław Połukard	Bydgoszcz	3	(2,1,0,0,0)
14	Edmund Migoś	Gorzów Wlkp.	3	(0,1,0,0,2)
15	Stanisław Skowron	Opole	3	(1,0,0,1,1)
16	Stanisław Kaiser	Gdańsk	1	(0,0,1,0,0)

=== Golden Helmet ===
The 1964 Golden Golden Helmet (Polish: Turniej o Złoty Kask, ZK) organised by the Polish Motor Union (PZM) was the 1964 event for league's leading riders.

Calendar

Date	Venue	Winner
23 IV	Rybnik	Stanisław Tkocz (Rybnik)
28 V	Gdańsk	Andrzej Wyglenda (Rybnik)
2 VII	Gorzów Wlkp.	Joachim Maj (Rybnik)
9 VII	Rzeszów	Stefan Kępa (Rzeszów)
16 VII	Świętochłowice	Paweł Waloszek (Świętochłowice)
27 VIII	Bydgoszcz	Andrzej Wyglenda (Rybnik)
3 IX	Wrocław	Andrzej Pogorzelski (Gorzów Wlkp.)

Final classification Note: Result from final score was subtracted with two the weakest events.

Pos.	Rider	Club	Total	RYB	GDA	GOR	RZE	ŚWI	BYD	WRO
1	Andrzej Wyglenda	Górnik Rybnik	65	13	13	11	11	14	14	10
2	Andrzej Pogorzelski	Gorzów Wlkp.	63	13	8	12	13	11	12	13
3	Joachim Maj	Górnik Rybnik	57	11	9	14	8	12	11	7
4	Marian Kaiser	Wybrzeże Gdańsk	53	12	13	6	-	8	11	9
5	Paweł Waloszek	Śląsk Świętochłowice	48	3	10	9	8	15	2	6
6	Stanisław Tkocz	Górnik Rybnik	47	14	2	5	9	9	3	10
7	Zbigniew Podlecki	Wybrzeże Gdańsk	43	9	11	0	-	0	11	12
8	Kazimierz Bentke	Unia Leszno	34	2	7	8	-	9	5	5
9	Jerzy Trzeszkowski	Sparta Wrocław	29	-	5	6	3	6	7	5
10	Stanisław Rurarz	Włókniarz Częstochowa	22	5	6	-	3	3	-	5
11	Mieczysław Połukard	Polonia Bydgoszcz	12	1	3	-	-	2	4	2

== Team ==
=== Team Speedway Polish Championship ===
The 1964 Team Speedway Polish Championship was the 17th edition of the Team Polish Championship. Górnik Rybnik won the gold medal for the third consecutive season.

=== First League ===
Pos	Club	Pts	W	D	L	+/−
1	Górnik Rybnik	22	11	0	3	+283
2	Stal Gorzów Wielkopolski	21	10	1	3	+82
3	Polonia Bydgoszcz	17	8	1	5	–33
4	Stal Rzeszów	16	8	0	6	+138
5	Wybrzeże Gdańsk	12	6	0	8	–11
6	Sparta Wrocław	12	6	0	8	–91
7	Śląsk Świętochłowice	10	5	0	9	–77
8	Unia Leszno	2	1	0	13	–292

=== Second League ===
Pos	Club	Pts	W	D	L	+/−
1	Włókniarz Częstochowa	30	15	0	5	+270
2	Karpaty Krosno	28	14	0	6	+225
3	Zgrzeblarki Zielona Góra	28	14	0	6	+210
4	Unia Tarnów	26	13	0	7	+120
5	Start Gniezno	25	12	1	7	+47
6	Wanda Nowa Huta	22	11	0	9	+79
7	Stal Toruń	18	9	0	11	–104
8	Polonia Piła	17	8	1	11	–85
9	Kolejarz Opole	10	5	0	15	–154
10	Motor Lublin	10	5	0	15	–183
11	Tramwajarz Łódź	6	3	0	17	–425

=== Two year tables ===
An additional award was given to the team that topped the league tables over a two-year period.

First League 1963-64

Pos	Club	Pts	W	D	L	+/−
1	Górnik Rybnik	48	24	0	4	+507
2	Stal Rzeszów	38	19	0	9	+386
3	Stal Gorzów Wielkopolski	31	15	1	12	+43
4	Polonia Bydgoszcz	25	12	1	15	–82
5	Sparta Wrocław	24	12	0	16	–106
6	Wybrzeże Gdańsk	24	12	0	16	–150
7	Śląsk Świętochłowice	20	10	0	18	–223
8	Unia Leszno	14	7	0	21	–367

Second League 1963-64

Pos	Club	Pts	W	D	L	+/−
1	Zgrzeblarki Zielona Góra	64	32	0	10	+400
2	Unia Tarnów	62	31	0	11	+501
3	Karpaty Krosno	59	29	1	12	+384
4	Włókniarz Częstochowa	58	28	0	14	+368
5	Start Gniezno	46	22	2	18	+88
6	Polonia Piła	45	22	1	19	+140
7	Stal Toruń	44	22	0	20	–32
8	Wanda Nowa Huta	32	16	0	26	–88
9	Motor Lublin	28	14	0	28	–285
10	Kolejarz Opole	22	11	0	31	–354
11	Tramwajarz Łódź	16	8	0	34	–861
12	Sparta Śrem	8	4	0	18	–261
