= 1965 Polish speedway season =

Motorcycle racing competition

The 1965 Polish Speedway season was the 1965 season of motorcycle speedway in Poland.

== Individual ==
=== Polish Individual Speedway Championship ===
The 1965 Individual Speedway Polish Championship was held on 12 September at Rybnik.

Pos.	Rider	Club	Total	Points
1	Stanisław Tkocz	Rybnik	15	(3,3,3,3,3)
2	Andrzej Wyglenda	Rybnik	14	(2,3,3,3,3)
3	Andrzej Pogorzelski	Gorzów Wlkp.	12 +3	(2,3,2,3,2)
4	Marian Kaiser	Gdańsk	12 +2	(3,2,3,2,2)
5	Joachim Maj	Rybnik	10	(3,1,2,1,3)
6	Zbigniew Podlecki	Gdańsk	10	(2,3,2,2,1)
7	Marian Rose	Toruń	7	(1,0,3,3,0)
8	Antoni Woryna	Rybnik	7	(0,2,u,2,3)
9	Jerzy Padewski	Gorzów Wlkp.	7	(1,1,2,1,2)
10	Jan Mucha	Świętochłowice	5	(0,2,1,0,2)
11	Paweł Waloszek	Świętochłowice	4	(1,2,0,1,0)
12	Adolf Słaboń	Wrocław	4	(0,1,1,1,1)
13	Stefan Kępa	Rzeszów	3	(3,0,–,–,–)
14	Edmund Migoś	Gorzów Wlkp.	3	(1,0,1,0,1)
15	Wiktor Waloszek	Świętochłowice	2	(2,0,0,0,0)
16	Henryk Żyto	Gdańsk	1	(0,1,0,0,0)
17	Stanisław Skowron (res)	Opole	4	(1,2,1)

=== Golden Helmet ===
The 1965 Golden Golden Helmet (Polish: Turniej o Złoty Kask, ZK) organised by the Polish Motor Union (PZM) was the 1965 event for league's leading riders.

Calendar

Date	Venue	Winner
10 VI	Zielona Góra	Andrzej Pogorzelski (Gorzów Wlkp.)
17 VI	Rybnik	Andrzej Wyglenda (Rybnik)
1 VII	Świętochłowice	Stanisław Tkocz (Rybnik)
7 VII	Gorzów Wlkp.	Andrzej Pogorzelski (Gorzów Wlkp.)
12 VIII	Toruń	Marian Rose (Toruń)
13 VIII	Gdańsk	Zbigniew Podlecki (Gdańsk)
24 IX	Bydgoszcz	Mieczysław Połukard (Bydgoszcz)
24 X	Wrocław	Antoni Woryna (Rybnik)

Final classification Note: Result from final score was subtracted with two the weakest events.

Pos.	Rider	Club	Total	ZIE	RYB	ŚWI	GOR	TOR	GDA	BYD	WRO
1	Stanisław Tkocz	ROW Rybnik	73	7	12	14	9	12	10	13	12
2	Andrzej Pogorzelski	Stal Gorzów Wlkp.	69	12	12	11	15	9	7	9	10
3	Antoni Woryna	ROW Rybnik	68	12	10	9	14	4	5	9	14
4	Paweł Waloszek	Śląsk Świętochłowice	66	9	12	13	10	6	13	5	9
5	Andrzej Wyglenda	ROW Rybnik	62	11	14	10	9	10	8	0	-
6	Zbigniew Podlecki	Wybrzeże Gdańsk	61	3	-	13	7	13	13	7	8
7	Joachim Maj	ROW Rybnik	61	10	13	8	12	9	8	9	7
8	Edmund Migoś	Stal Gorzów Wlkp.	53	7	7	-	11	5	6	12	10
9	Jerzy Trzeszkowski	Sparta Wrocław	53	8	9	3.5	9	0	10	10	7
10	Henryk Żyto	Wybrzeże Gdańsk	51	10	5	11	4	11	10	5	-
11	Jan Mucha	Śląsk Świętochłowice	47	9	5	7	4	6	9	6	10
12	Jerzy Padewski	Stal Gorzów Wlkp.	37	5	8	0	9	8	3	4	3
13	Marian Kaiser	Wybrzeże Gdańsk	20	1	2	5	2	2	8	0	-

== Team ==
=== Team Speedway Polish Championship ===
The 1965 Team Speedway Polish Championship was the 18th edition of the Team Polish Championship.

KS ROW Rybnik won the gold medal for the fourth consecutive season. The team included Joachim Maj, Antoni Woryna, Andrzej Wyglenda and Stanisław Tkocz.

=== First League ===
Pos	Club	Pts	W	D	L	+/−
1	ROW Rybnik	26	13	0	1	+267
2	Stal Gorzów Wielkopolski	19	9	1	4	+88
3	Wybrzeże Gdańsk	17	8	1	5	+71
4	Stal Rzeszów	16	8	0	6	+17
5	Sparta Wrocław	14	6	2	6	+10
6	Śląsk Świętochłowice	10	5	0	9	–81
7	Polonia Bydgoszcz	6	3	0	11	–90
8	Zgrzeblarki Zielona Góra	4	2	0	12	–282

=== Second League ===
Pos	Club	Pts	W	D	L	+/−
1	Włókniarz Częstochowa	26	13	0	3	+291
2	Unia Tarnów	23	11	1	4	+133
3	Kolejarz Opole	21	10	1	5	+135
4	Stal Toruń	20	9	2	5	+71
5	Karpaty Krosno	18	9	0	7	+51
6	Unia Leszno	13	6	1	9	–28
7	Polonia Piła	9	4	1	11	–178
8	Motor Lublin	8	4	0	12	–72
9	Start Gniezno	6	3	0	13	–403
10	Wanda Nowa Huta (withdrew)					
