= 1962 Polish speedway season =

Motorcycle racing competition

The 1962 Polish Speedway season was the 1962 season of motorcycle speedway in Poland.

== Individual ==
=== Polish Individual Speedway Championship ===
The 1962 Individual Speedway Polish Championship was held on 2 September at Rzeszow.

Pos.	Rider	Club	Total	Points
1	Florian Kapała	Rzeszów	15	(3,3,3,3,3)
2	Henryk Żyto	Leszno	14	(3,3,3,3,2)
3	Joachim Maj	Rybnik	13	(2,2,3,3,3)
4	Marian Kaiser	Gdańsk	12	(1,3,2,3,3)
5	Konstanty Pociejkowicz	Wrocław	10	(3,0,3,2,2)
6	Janusz Kościelak	Rzeszów	8	(3,2,1,1,1)
7	Antoni Woryna	Rybnik	8	(1,1,2,1,3)
8	Paweł Waloszek	Świętochłowice	8	(2,0,2,2,2)
9	Janusz Suchecki	Bydgoszcz	8	(2,1,1,2,2)
10	Mieczysław Połukard	Bydgoszcz	5	(1,3,d,d,1)
11	Zdzisław Waliński	Leszno	5	(2,2,0,1,0)
12	Marian Spychała	Rzeszów	5	(1,d,2,2,d)
13	Karol Peszke	Rybnik	4	(0,2,1,1,d)
14	Stanisław Rurarz	Częstochowa	3	(0,1,1,0,1)
15	Bogdan Berliński	Rybnik	1	(0,1,0,0,0)
16	Marian Stawecki	Rzeszów	1	(0,0,0,0,1)
17	Józef Batko (res)	Rzeszów		(ns)
18	Norbert Świtała (res)	Bydgoszcz		(ns)
19	Włodzimierz Szwendrowski (res)	Łódź		(ns)
20	Jan Kusiak (res)	Leszno		(ns)
21	Andrzej Domiszewski (res)	Wrocław		(ns)

=== Golden Helmet ===
The 1962 Golden Helmet (Polish: Turniej o Złoty Kask, ZK) organised by the Polish Motor Union (PZM) was the 1962 event for league's leading riders.

Calendar

Date	Venue	Winner
5 V	Rzeszów	Florian Kapała (Rzeszów)
19 V	Wrocław	Marian Kaiser (Gdańsk)
23 VI	Bydgoszcz	Marian Kaiser (Gdańsk)
7 VII	Gorzów Wlkp.	Marian Kaiser (Gdańsk)
14 VII	Rybnik	Joachim Maj (Rybnik)
22 VII	Leszno	Marian Kaiser (Gdańsk)
18 VIII	Częstochowa	Marian Kaiser (Gdańsk)
25 VIII	Gdańsk	Paweł Waloszek (Świętochłowice)

Final classification Note: Result from final score was subtracted with two the weakest events.

Pos.	Rider	Club	Total	RZE	WRO	BYD	GOR	RYB	LES	CZE	GDA
1	Marian Kaiser	Wybrzeże Gdańsk	88	14	15	14	15	10	15	15	4
2	Florian Kapała	Stal Rzeszów	78	15	9	12	12	11	14	8	14
3	Joachim Maj	Górnik Rybnik	71	10	12	10	7	15	7	13	11
4	Paweł Waloszek	Śląsk Świętochłowice	66	11	9	8	13	-	-	10	15
5	Henryk Żyto	Unia Leszno	64	5	12	11	8	9	10	14	8
6	Konstanty Pociejkowicz	Sparta Wrocław	58	10	11	-	-	9	11	5	12
7	Mieczysław Połukard	Polonia Bydgoszcz	55	11	10	10	6	10	7	7	6
8	Stanisław Tkocz	Górnik Rybnik	44	7	1	-	8	13	7	-	-
9	Antoni Woryna	Górnik Rybnik	44	2	2	2	5	7	11	11	8
10	Norbert Świtała	Polonia Bydgoszcz	37	4	7	10	5	-	2	6	5
11	Kazimierz Bentke	Unia Leszno	36	7	4	5	5	6	7	4	6
12	Bronisław Rogal	Stal Gorzów Wlkp.	30	-	7	-	7	8	-	5	2
13	Jan Kusiak	Unia Leszno	29	4	7	2	-	4	8	2	4
14	Stanisław Kaiser	Wybrzeże Gdańsk	15	3	-	5	1	0	1	1	4

== Team ==
=== Team Speedway Polish Championship ===
The 1962 Team Speedway Polish Championship was the 15th edition of the Team Polish Championship. Górnik Rybnik won the gold medal.

=== First League ===
Pos	Club	Pts	W	D	L	+/−
1	Górnik Rybnik	26	13	0	1	+312
2	Stal Rzeszów	18	9	0	4	+117
3	Unia Leszno	16	8	0	5	+9
4	Polonia Bydgoszcz	12	6	0	8	+68
5	Wybrzeże Gdańsk	12	6	0	8	–67
6	Sparta Wrocław	12	6	0	8	–93
7	Stal Gorzów Wielkopolski	8	4	0	10	–68
8	Włókniarz Częstochowa	6	3	0	11	–278

=== Second League ===
Pos	|Club	Pts	W	D	L	+/−
1	Śląsk Świętochłowice	36	18	0	4	+290
2	Zgrzeblarki Zielona Góra	34	17	0	5	+257
3	Stal Toruń	32	16	0	6	+243
4	Unia Tarnów	29	14	1	7	+282
5	Start Gniezno	25	12	1	9	+69
6	Wanda Nowa Huta	23	11	1	10	+53
7	Polonia Piła	22	11	0	11	+92
8	Tramwajarz Łódź	20	10	0	12	+54
9	Karpaty Krosno	20	10	0	12	–93
10	Kolejarz Opole	12	6	0	16	–264
11	Motor Lublin	10	3	0	19	–490
12	Sparta Śrem	8	2	1	19	–493

Play off

- Zielona Góra v Gorzów Wielkopolski 33:45, 25:52
