= 1962 Speedway World Team Cup =

3rd edition of the annual motorcycle speedway World Cup competition

Seasons
- ← 1961 1963 →

1962 Speedway World Team Cup was the third edition of the FIM Speedway World Team Cup to determine the team world champions.

The final took place in Slaný, Czechoslovakia. The World Champion title was won by Sweden (36 pts) who beat Great Britain (24 pts), Poland (20 pts) and Czechoslovakia (16 pts).

== Format ==
Semifinals
23 April - Vetlanda (details)
Sweden	41
Norway	24
Denmark	17
Finland	14
Canceled (details)
Great Britain	–
–	–
–	–
–	–
15 July - Liberec (details)
Czechoslovakia	46
Yugoslavia	25
Czechoslovakia B	21
Austria	4
15 July - Rzeszów (details)
Poland	43
Soviet Union	33
Bulgaria	13
East Germany	7

Final
29 July - Slaný (details)
Sweden	36
Great Britain	24
Poland	20
Czechoslovakia	16

== Qualification ==
=== Nordic Round ===
- 23 April
- (Sweden) Vetlanda, Vetlanda Motorstadion

Pos.	National team	Pts.	Riders
1st	Sweden	41	Joel Jansson - 6 (1,3,2,0); Ove Fundin - 12 (3,3,3,3); Rune Sörmander - 12 (3,3,3,3); Leif Larsson - 11 (3,3,2,3); Göran Johansson - NS
2nd	Norway	24	Aage Hansen - 9 (3,1,3,2); Sverre Harrfeldt - 8 (1,2,2,3); Egil Bratvold - 5 (0,2,2,1); Cato Agnor - 2 (1,0,0,1); Per Aulie - NS
3rd	Denmark	17	Einar Hansen - 3 (2,0,1,0); Kurt W. Petersen - 9 (2,2,3,2); Svend Nissen - 5 (1,2,1,1); John S. Andersen - 0 (0,0,0,0); Bent Jensen - NS
4	Finland	14	Illka Nielminen - 0 (0,-,-,-); Antti Pajari - 3 (0,1,0,2); Timo Laine - 5 (2,1,1,1); Kalevi Lahtinen - 4 (2,0,0,2); Esko Koponen - 2 (-,1,1,0,)

=== British Round ===
The British Round was cancelled. Great Britain was seeded to the World Final.

=== Central European Round ===
- 15 July
- (Czechoslovakia) Pavlovičky Stadion, Liberec
- West Germany was replaced by second team from Czechoslovakia

Pos.	National team	Pts.	Riders
1st	Czechoslovakia	46	Bedřich Slaný - 12; Jaroslav Wolf - 12; Karel Průša - 11; Luboš Tomíček - 11
2nd	Yugoslavia	25	Franc Babic - 9 Valent Medved - 7 Drago Perko - 5 Drago Regvart - 4
3rd	Czechoslovakia	21*	Zdeněk Kovář - 8 Pavel Mareš - 5 František Hubner - 4 Stanislav Svoboda - 4
4	Austria	4	Josef Bössner - 3 Johan Hartl - 1 Helmut Happer - 0 Kurt Schwingenschlogl - 0

=== East European Round ===
- 15 July
- (Poland) Rybnik, Rybnik Municipal Stadium

Pos.	National team	Pts.	Riders
1st	Poland	43	1.Florian Kapała - 12 (3,3,3,3); 2.Marian Kaiser - 12 (3,3,3,3); 3.Henryk Żyto - 7 (3,3,1,X); 4.Stefan Kepa - 12 (3,3,3,3); 17.Joachim Maj - NS
2nd	Soviet Union	33	13.Igor Plechanov - NS; 14.Boris Samorodov - 8 (2,2,2,2); 15.Farid Szajnurov - 9 (2,2,3,2); 16.Leonid Drobyazko - 9 (2,2,2,3); 20.Vladimir Sokolov - 7 (2,2,2,1)
3rd	Bulgaria	13	5.Milko Pejkov - 6 (1,1,2,2); 6.Boris Damjanov - 2 (1,0,0,1); 7.Dimitri Bajev - 3 (1,1,1,0); 8.Krasimir Sokolov - 2 (0,0,0,2); 18.Simeon Lukanov - NS
4	East Germany	7	9.Gunther Schelenz - 2 (0,1,0,1); 10.Josef Kohl - 0 (0,-,-,-); 11.Jürgen Hehlert - 1 (1,0,0,0); 12.Wilhelm Gunther - 1 (0,0,1,-); 19.Werner Frenzel - 3 (-,1,1,1/0,)

== World final ==
- 29 July
- (Czechoslovakia) Slaný, Slaný Speedway

Pos.	National team	Pts.	Riders
1st	Sweden	36	Björn Knutson - 10 (3,2,3,2); Soren Sjösten -10 (3,3,3,1); Ove Fundin - 9 (0,3,3,3); Göte Nordin - 4 (0,1,3,-); Rune Sörmander - 3 (-,-,-,3)
2nd	Great Britain	24	Ronnie Moore - 10 (3,3,1,3); Barry Briggs - 8 (2,2,2,2); Peter Craven - 6 (1,1,2,2); Ron How - 0 (0,0,0,-); Cyril Maidment - 0 (-,-,-,0)
3rd	Poland	20	Marian Kaiser - 9 (2,3,1,3); Florian Kapała - 5 (2,1,2,0); Joachim Maj - 4 (1,2,0,1); Paweł Waloszek - 2 (2,0,-,0); Mieczysław Połukard - 0 (-,-,0,-)
4	Czechoslovakia	16	Luboš Tomíček - 7 (3,1,2,1); Bedřich Slaný - 4 (1,0,1,2); Jaroslav Volf - 3 (0,2,1,0); Karel Průša - 2 (1,0,-,1); Bohumír Bartoněk - 0 (-,-,0,-)

== See also ==
- motorcycle speedway
- 1962 Individual Speedway World Championship
