= 1963 Speedway World Team Cup =

4th edition of the annual motorcycle speedway World Cup competition

Seasons
- ← 1962 1964 →

1963 Speedway World Team Cup was the fourth edition of the FIM Speedway World Team Cup to determine the team world champions.

The final took place in Vienna, Austria. The World Champion title was won by Sweden (37 pts) who beat Czechoslovakia (27 pts), Great Britain (25 pts) and Poland (7 pts).

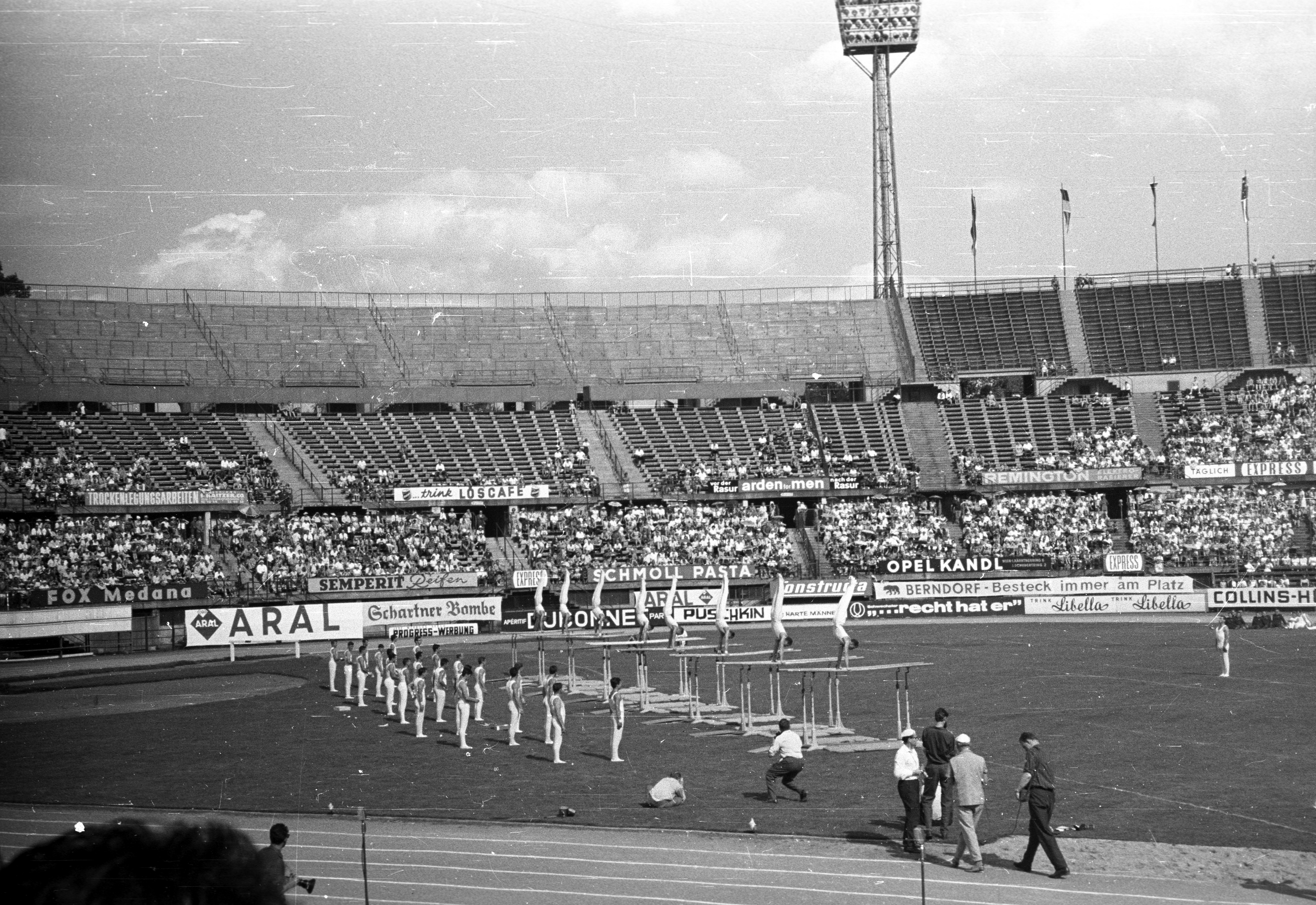
The Stadion Wien pictured here in 1965 was the venue for the 1963 final.

== Format ==
Semifinals
23 May - Målilla, Sweden (details)
Sweden | 48
Norway | 22
Denmark | 18
Finland | 8
Canceled (details)
Great Britain | –
– | –
– | –
– | –
13 June - Olching, West Germany (details)
Czechoslovakia | 41
West Germany | 39
Yugoslavia | 8
Austria | 7
4 August - Ufa, Soviet Union (details)
Poland | 40
Soviet Union | 39
East Germany | 15
Bulgaria | 1

Final
31 August - Vienna, Austria (details)
Sweden | 37
Czechoslovakia | 27
Great Britain | 25
Poland | 7

== Qualification ==
=== Nordic Round ===
- 23 May
- (Sweden) Målilla Motorbana, Målilla

| Pos. | National team | Pts. | Riders |
|---|---|---|---|
| 1st | Sweden | 48 | Arne Carlsson - 12 (3,3,3,3); Björn Knutson - 12 (3,3,3,3); Per Olof Söderman - 12 (3,3,3,3); Per Tage Svensson - 12 (3,3,3,3) |
| 2nd | Norway | 22 | Aage Hansen - 7 (2,1,2,2); Jon Ødegaard - 6 (1,2,1,2); Cato Agnor - 5 (2,0,1,2); Reidar Eide - 4 (1,1,1,1) |
| 3rd | Denmark | 18 | Paul Wissing - 8 (2,2,2,2); Erik Kastebo - 4 (0,2,2,0); Hans Möller - 4 (2,1,0,1); Einar Hansen - 2 (1,0,0,1) |
| 4 | Finland | 8 | Esko Koponen - 5 (0,2,2,1); Matti Olin - 3 (1,1,1,0); Martti Assinen - 0 (0,0,0,0); Kari Ala-Sippola - 0 (0,0,0,0) |

=== British Round ===
The British Round was cancelled. Great Britain was seeded to the Final.

=== Central European Round ===
- 13 June
- (West Germany) Olching, Olching Speedwaybahn

| Pos. | National team | Pts. | Riders |
|---|---|---|---|
| 1st | Czechoslovakia | 41 | Antonín Kasper Sr. - 11; Stanislav Kubíček - 10; Karel Průša - 10; Luboš Tomíček Sr. - 10 |
| 2nd | West Germany | 39 | Josef Hofmeister - 12 (3,3,3,3); Manfred Poschenreider - 10; Heinrich Sprenger - 9 Alfred Aberl - 8 |
| 3rd | Yugoslavia | 8 | Evald Babic - 3 Damijan Klasnetic - 3 Drago Perko - 2 Milan Kalisnik - 0 |
| 4 | Austria | 7 | Kurt Schwingenschlögl - 4 Günther Walla - 3 Wilfried Vacano - 0 Leopold Dolansky - 0 |

=== East European Round ===
- 4 August
- (Soviet Union) Stroitel Stadium, Ufa

| Pos. | National team | Pts. | Riders |
|---|---|---|---|
| 1st | Poland | 40 | Antoni Woryna - 6 (2,2,2,-); Marian Kaiser - 10 (3,2,2,3); Joachim Maj - 2 (2,-,-,-); Henryk Żyto - 12 (3,3,3,3); Andrzej Pogorzelski - 10 (-,2,3,3\2) |
| 2nd | Soviet Union | 39 | Boris Samorodov - 11 (2,3,3,3); Igor Plekhanov - 9 (2,3,2,2); Gennady Kurilenko - 10 (3,3,2,2); Viktor Shilo - NS; Leonid Drobyazko - 9 (3,1,3,2) |
| 3rd | East Germany | 16 | Jochen Dinse - 4 (0,2,1,1); Jürgen Hehlert - 4 (1,1,1,1); Günther Schelenz - 4 (1,1,1,1); Jürgen Rudolph - 4 (1,1,1,1); Heino Niemann - NS |
| 4 | Bulgaria | 1 | Milko Pejkov - 1 (1,0,-,-); Boris Damjanov - 0 (-,0,0,0); Krasimir Sokolov - 0 (0,0,0,0); Gavril Macev - 0 (0,0,-,0); Aleksander Stojanov - 0 (0,-,0\0,0) |

== World final ==
- 31 August
- (Austria) Vienna, Stadion Wien

| Pos. | National team | Pts. | Riders |
|---|---|---|---|
| 1st | Sweden | 37 | Björn Knutson - 11 (3,3,3,2); Per Olof Söderman - 10 (3,3,1,3); Ove Fundin - 7 (2,2,-,3); Göte Nordin - 6 (3,2,0,1) res. Rune Sörmander - 3 (-,-,3,-) |
| 2nd | Czechoslovakia | 27 | Antonín Kasper Sr. - 10 (2,3,2,3); Stanislav Kubíček - 7 (1,1,3,2); Miroslav Šmíd - 5 (2,1,1,1); Luboš Tomíček Sr. - 5 (0,1,2,2) |
| 3rd | Great Britain | 25 | Barry Briggs - 12 (3,3,3,3); Peter Craven - 8 (2,2,2,2); Dick Fisher - 4 (0,2,1,1); Peter Moore - 1 (0,0,0,1) res. Leo McAuliffe - NS |
| 4 | Poland | 7 | Henryk Żyto - 4 (1,1,2,0); Marian Kaiser - 1 (0,0,1,0); Joachim Maj - 1 (1,0,-,0); Stanisław Tkocz - 1 (1,0,0,0) res. Andrzej Pogorzelski - 0 (-,-,0,-) |

== See also ==
- 1963 Individual Speedway World Championship
- motorcycle speedway
