= Franck Djoulou =

Ivorian football player

Frank Djoulou
Personal information
- Full name: Franck Alain Djoulou Zohoki
- Date of birth: 1 January 1999 (age 27)
- Height: 1.85 m (6 ft 1 in)
- Position: Forward

Team information
- Current team: Pro Sesto
- Number: 11

Youth career
- –2017: Union Q.D.P.
- 2016–2017: → Udinese (loan)
- 2017–2018: Udinese
- 2018–2019: Torino

Senior career*
Years	Team	Apps	(Gls)
2017–2018	Udinese	0	(0)
2018–2019	Torino	0	(0)
2019	→ Bisceglie (loan)	9	(0)
2020–2021	Schaffhausen	18	(1)
2021–2022	Olhanense	21	(3)
2022–2023	Créteil	21	(1)
2023–2024	Karpaty Krosno	26	(1)
2024–	Pro Sesto	17	(3)
- * Club domestic league appearances and goals as of 1 January 2025

Franck Alain Djoulou Zohoki (born 1 January 1999) is an Ivorian professional footballer who plays as a forward for Serie D club Pro Sesto. He also holds Italian citizenship.

== Club career ==
He joined Udinese before the 2016–17 season and mostly played for their Under-19 squad. He also made some bench appearances for the senior squad during the 2016–17 Serie A and 2017–18 Serie A seasons.

In the summer of 2018 he moved to Torino.

On 11 January 2019, he joined Serie C club Bisceglie on loan with a purchase option. He made his Serie C debut for Bisceglie on 20 January 2019 in a game against Reggina, as a 76th-minute substitute for Luigi Cuppone.

On 28 July 2020 he signed a one-season contract with Schaffhausen in Switzerland.

On 24 September 2021, he signed with Olhanense in Portugal.

In the summer of 2023, after a year-long stint with French side Créteil, Djoulou joined Polish III liga club Karpaty Krosno, and made his debut on 2 September in a 3–0 loss against Star Starachowice.

In August 2024, Djoulou returned to Italy to sign with Serie D club Pro Sesto.

== Honours ==
Karpaty Krosno

- Polish Cup (Krosno regionals): 2023–24
