= Jan Grabowski (speedway rider) =

Polish speedway rider (1950–2017)

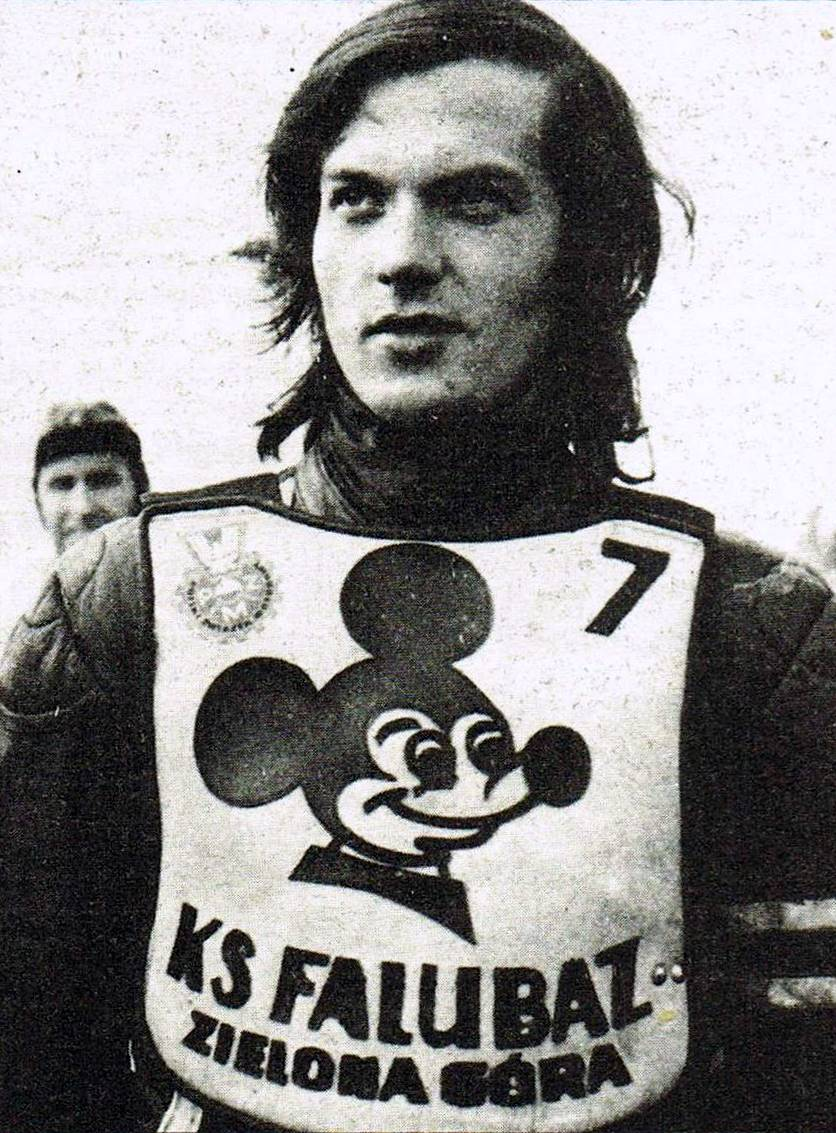
- Grabowski in 1973
- Born: 27 May 1950; Myślibórz, Poland
- Died: 13 February 2017 (aged 66); Zielona Góra, Poland

Career history
- 1972-1980: Zielona Góra

Team honours
- 1973, 1979: Team Speedway Polish Championship

Jan Grabowski (27 May 1950 – 13 February 2017) was a Polish speedway rider.

== Biography ==
From 1970 to 1980, Grabowski represented Falubaz Zielona Góra. He, with the team, twice won bronze medals at the Team Speedway Polish Championship in 1973 and 1979.

After the end of his active career, Grabowski began working as a youth coach in Zielona Góra. In 1985, he became the trainer premier of Falubaz and in the same season he won with his team the title of Team Speedway Polish Championship. Falubaz won another medal, a silver medal, coached by him in 1989.

During his coaching career, Grabowski also led, among others, ŻKS ROW Rybnik and KM Ostrów Wielkopolski from November 2010 to his death. He was the first coach of, among others, Piotr Protasiewicz, a multiple medal-winning international speedway rider.

Grabowski died on 13 February 2017, aged 66, in Zielona Góra.

== Bibliography ==
- Wiesław Dobruszek, "Żużlowe ABC" tom I, Leszno 2004, page 168
- Jan Grabowski's Birthday
- The history of the Speedway
