= KS ROW Rybnik =

Polish motorcycle speedway team

ROW Rybnik
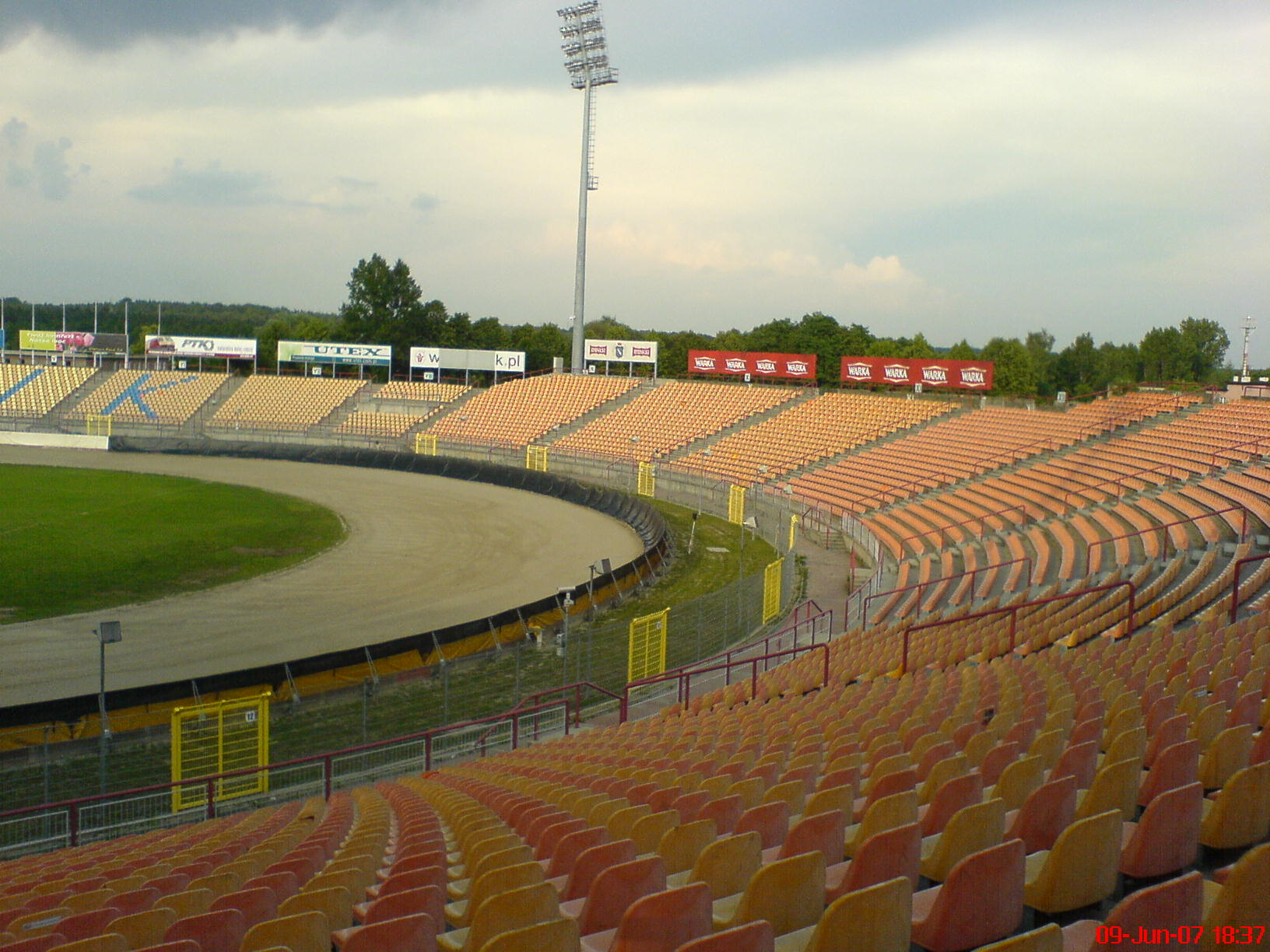
- Rybnik Municipal Stadium in 2007

Club information
- Track address: Rybnik Municipal Stadium ul. Gliwicka 72; Rybnik
- Country: Poland
- Founded: 1930
- Team manager: Piotr Żyto
- League: Ekstraliga 2
- Website: Official website

Club facts
- Colours: Green and Black
- Nickname: Sharks, Green and Black
- Track size: 357 metres (1,171 ft)
- Track record time: 62.10
- Track record date: 16 April 2022
- Track record holder: Grzegorz Zengota

Major team honours
Team Speedway Polish Championship x 12	1956, 1957, 1958, 1962, 1963, 1964, 1965, 1966, 1967, 1968, 1970, 1972

Klub Sportowy ROW Rybnik, also known as ROW Rybnik, is a Polish motorcycle speedway team based in Rybnik, which currently competes in Ekstraliga (speedway). Rybnik is one of the oldest and most successful teams in Polish speedway having won the league championship on twelve occasions. ROW is one of the several clubs of the once united ROW Rybnik multi-sports club.

== History ==
=== 1948 to 1959 ===
Speedway in Rybnik has existed since 1930. The club competed in the inaugural 1948 Polish speedway season, under the name of RKO (builders) Right . They won the silverware during the 1950 Polish speedway season. As Górnik Rybnik the team won three consecutive titles in 1956, 1957 and 1958. The team included riders such as Stanisław Tkocz and Joachim Maj, who was Polish champion in 1958

=== 1960 to 1969 ===
The 1960s was not only the most successful for the club but the most successful decade of all time for any club. As Górnik Rybnik they earned a silver in 1961 and then embarked on seven consecutive gold medal wins in 1962, 1963, 1964, 1965, 1966, 1967 and 1968. Four of these wins were achieved under the new name ROW Rybnik because in 1964, the multi-sports club ROW Rybnik was formed as a result of a merger between two local clubs RKS Górnik Rybnik and KS Górnik Chwałowice. Furthermore, three of the club's riders won the five Polish Championships; Andrzej Wyglenda (1964, 1968 and 1969), Stanisław Tkocz (1965) and Antoni Woryna (1966).

=== 1970 to 1989 ===
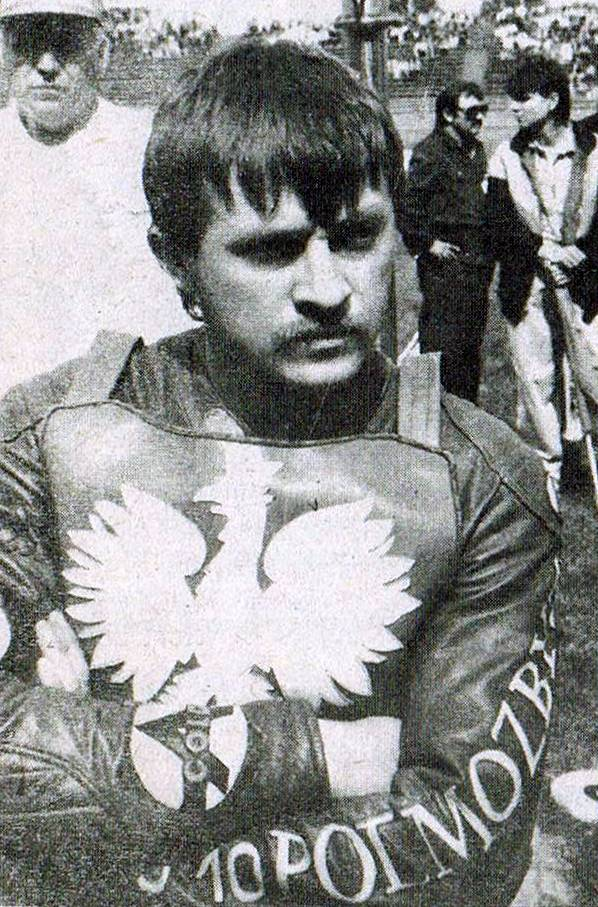
Eugeniusz Skupień, Rybnik from 1983 to 1992

The 1970s was much less emphatic but the club still managed to win their 11th and 12th gold medal wins in 1970 and 1972. Jerzy Gryt won the 1971 Polish Championship and Andrzej Wyglenda won his second in 1973.

The 1980s resulted in a gradual decline and the team suffered relegation in 1982 but by the end of the decade they had recovered to win a silver and a bronze medal in 1988 and 18899887 respectively.

=== 1990 to 1999 ===
After a silver medal win in 1990 the club underwent a name change to Rybnicki Klub Motorowy (Rybnik's Motorcycle Club) in 1994. The remainder of the decade saw very few highlights.

=== 2000 to 2009 ===
When the Ekstraliga was introduced in 2000, Rybnik were in the 1. Liga. They won the 1. Liga in 2003. In 2009, they reverted to the historical "ROW" prefix as RKM ROW Rybnik.

=== 2010 to present ===
In 2013, they changed name again, to ŻKS ROW Rybnik, the same season they won 2. Liga. In 2019, they gained promotion back to the Ekstraliga but were relegated the following season (2020) and have struggled since. They currently race as KS ROW Rybnik.

== 2026 Squad ==
Polish Speedway First League

- Seniors:
  - (Poland) Jakub Jamróg
  - (Poland) Patryk Wojdyło
  - (Poland) Wiktor Lampard
  - (Czech Republic) Jan Kvech
  - (Denmark) Nikolai Klindt
- Under-24:
  - (Denmark) Jesper Knudsen
- Under-21 juniors:
  - (Poland) Kacper Tkocz
  - (Poland) Kamil Winkler
  - (Poland) Jakub Żurek
  - (Poland) Roch Wujec
  - (Poland) Wiktor Klecha
  - (Poland) Nikodem Leśnik
  - (Poland) Piotr Reszka
  - (Poland) Franciszek Szczyrba
- Team Manager:
  - (Poland) Robert Mikołajczak
- U24 Team Manager:
  - (Poland) Antoni Skupień
- Członek sztabu szkoleniowego:
  - (Denmark) Patrick Hansen

== Previous teams ==
Extended content

2025 Squad - Ekstraliga (speedway)

- Seniors:
  - (Poland) Maksym Drabik announced on 15.11.2024 (confirmed by rider on 12.11.2024)
  - (Poland) Gleb Chugunov announced on 15.11.2024
  - (Australia) Chris Holder announced on 15.11.2024
  - (Australia) Rohan Tungate announced on 15.11.2024
  - (Denmark) Nicki Pedersen announced on 15.11.2024
- Under-24:
  - (Poland) Kacper Pludra announced on 15.11.2024
  - (Denmark) Jesper Knudsen announced on 15.11.2024
- Under-21 juniors:
  - (Poland) Maksym Borowiak TBC
  - (Poland) Paweł Trześniewski announced on 15.11.2024
  - (Poland) Kacper Tkocz announced on 15.11.2024
  - (Poland) Kamil Winkler announced on 15.11.2024
  - (Poland) Paweł Wyczyszczok announced on 15.11.2024
- Team Manager:
  - (Poland) Piotr Żyto announced on 14.11.2024
- U24 Team Manager:
  - (Poland) Antoni Skupień announced on 14.11.2024

Relegated to Polish Speedway First League

2024 Squad - Polish Speedway First League

- Seniors: (¦ matches ¦ overall points ¦ bonus points ¦ season average points¦)
  - (Australia) Brady Kurtz announced on 19.10.2023 (¦ 20 ¦ 222 ¦ 11 ¦ 2.402 ¦) TOP LEAGE SCORER
  - (Australia) Rohan Tungate announced on 13.10.2023 @ 13:13 (¦ 20 ¦ 193 ¦ 22 ¦ 2.067 ¦)
  - (Denmark) Patrick Hansen announced on 14.10.2023 - 2y contact (not participate due to injury)
  - (Poland) Jakub Jamróg announced on 30.10.2023 (¦ 20 ¦ 192 ¦ 16 ¦ 2.039 ¦)
  - (Poland) Grzegorz Walasek announced on 13.11.2023 (¦ 20 ¦ 107 ¦ 11 ¦ 1.475 ¦)
- Under-24:
  - (Germany) Norick Blödorn announced on 6.11.2023 (¦ 20 ¦ 100 ¦ 13 ¦ 1.299 ¦)
- Under-21 juniors:
  - (Poland) Maksym Borowiak announced on 9.03.2024 - loan from FOGO Unia Leszno (¦ 19 ¦ 47 ¦ 10 ¦ 1.239 ¦)
  - (Poland) Paweł Trześniewski announced on 15.11.2023 (¦ 19 ¦ 56 ¦ 2 ¦ 1.208 ¦)
  - (Poland) Kacper Tkocz announced on 15.11.2023 (¦ 19 ¦ 21 ¦ 6 ¦ 0.618 ¦)
  - (Poland) Seweryn Grabarczyk announced on 15.11.2023
  - (Poland) Szymon Tomaszewski long-term deal, announced on 15.11.2023
  - (Poland) Kamil Winkler announced on 15.11.2023
  - (Poland) Paweł Wyczyszczok
- Team Manager:
  - (Poland) Antoni Skupień

KS ROW Rybnik has been promoted to the TOP League - Ekstraliga (speedway)

2023 Squad - Polish Speedway First League

- Seniors:
  - (Australia) Brady Kurtz
  - (Czech Republic) Jan Kvěch - on loan from ZKŻ Zielona Góra
  - (Denmark) Patrick Hansen
  - (Poland) Krystian Pieszczek - loaned to Rzeszów
  - (Poland) Lars Skupień
  - (Slovenia) Matej Žagar
- Under-24:
  - (Poland) Patryk Wojdyło
- Under-21 juniors:
  - (Poland) Lech Chlebowski
  - (Poland) Seweryn Grabarczyk
  - (Poland) Kacper Tkocz
  - (Poland) Szymon Tomaszewski
  - (Poland) Paweł Trześniewski
  - (Poland) Kamil Winkler
  - (Poland) Paweł Wyczyszczok
- Team Manager:
  - (Poland) Antoni Skupień

2022 Squad - Polish Speedway First League

- Seniors:
  - (Poland) Grzegorz Zengota
  - (Poland) Krystian Pieszczek
  - (Denmark) Andreas Lyager
  - (Denmark) Nicolai Klindt loan from KM Ostrów Wielkopolski on 26.04.2022
  - (Russia) Sergey Logachev suspended by Polish Automobile and Motorcycle Federation
  - (Poland) Patryk Wojdyło
  - (Poland) Kacper Tkocz
  - (Poland) Paweł Trześniewski
  - (Poland) Lech Chlebowski
- Under 24:
  - (United Kingdom) Leon Flint
- Under-21 juniors:
  - (Poland) Seweryn Grabarczyk
  - (Poland) Szymon Tomaszewski
- Team Manager:
  - (Poland) Antoni Skupień

2021 Squad - Polish Speedway First League

- Seniors:
  - (Poland) Rune Holta
  - (Poland) Kacper Gomólski
  - (Denmark) Michael Jepsen Jensen
  - (Russia) Sergey Logachev
  - (Sweden) Pontus Aspgren
- Under-24:
  - (Poland) Viktor Trofimov jr.
  - (United Kingdom) Leon Flint
- Under-21 juniors:
  - (Poland) Przemyslaw Giera
  - (Poland) Mateusz Tudziez
  - (Poland) Paweł Trześniewski
  - (Poland) Blazej Wypior
- Team Manager:
  - (Poland) Marek Cieślak

2020 Squad - Ekstraliga (speedway)

- Seniors: (Average points per: ¦ heat ¦ meeting ¦)
  - (Australia) Troy Batchelor ¦ 0,625 ¦ 1,25 ¦
  - (United States) Greg Hancock (sign contract on 15.11.2019, but retired on 15.02.2020 before start of the season in Poland)
  - (United Kingdom) Robert Lambert ¦ 1,838 ¦ 10,14 ¦
  - (Latvia) Andžejs Lebedevs ¦ 1,400 ¦ 3,67 ¦
  - (Russia) Sergey Logachev ¦ 1,465 ¦ 5,40 ¦
  - (Czech Republic) Vaclav Milik ¦ 1,226 ¦ 5,38 ¦
  - (Poland) Mateusz Szczepaniak ¦ 1,207 ¦ 3,10 ¦
  - (Poland) Kacper Woryna ¦ 1,514 ¦ 7,21 ¦
  - (Poland) Adrian Miedziński (as a guest) ¦ 1,241 ¦ 4,13 ¦
- Under-21 juniors:
  - (Poland) Kacper Duda
  - (Poland) Przemyslaw Giera
  - (Poland) Kacper Klosok ¦ 0,000 ¦ 0,00 ¦
  - (Poland) Mateusz Tudziez ¦ 0,564 ¦ 1,21 ¦
  - (Poland) Dominik Tyman
  - (Poland) Blazej Wypior
  - (Poland) Kamil Nowacki (loaned on 22.06.2020) ¦ 0,614 ¦ 1,92 ¦
- Team Manager:
  - (Poland) Piotr Swiderski (announced on 4.11.2019, but resigned before start of the season on 17.02.2020)
  - (Poland) Lech Kędziora (announced on 28.02.2020)

KS ROW Rybnik has been relegated from the Ekstraliga (speedway) to the Polish Speedway First League

2019 Squad - Polish Speedway First League

- Seniors:
  - (Australia) Troy Batchelor
  - (United Kingdom) Daniel Bewley
  - (Australia) Jye Etheridge
  - (Australia) Nick Morris
  - (Russia) Sergey Logachev
  - (Sweden) Linus Sundstroem
  - (Poland) Mateusz Szczepaniak
  - (Poland) Zbigniew Suchecki
  - (Poland) Kacper Woryna
- Under-21 juniors:
  - (Poland) Robert Chmiel
  - (Poland) Kacper Duda
  - (Poland) Przemyslaw Giera
  - (Poland) Dawid Jona
  - (Poland) Kacper Klosok
  - (Poland) Mateusz Tudziez
  - (Poland) Dominik Tyman
- Team Manager:
  - (Poland) Piotr Zyto

KS ROW Rybnik has been promoted to the TOP League - Ekstraliga (speedway)

2018 Squad

- Seniors:
  - (Australia) Troy Batchelor
  - (United Kingdom) Craig Cook
  - (Poland) Artur Czaja
  - (Ukraine) Andriej Karpow
  - (Poland) Mateusz Szczepaniak
  - (Poland) Kacper Woryna
- Under-21 juniors:
  - (Poland) Robert Chmiel
  - (Poland) Przemyslaw Giera
  - (Poland) Dawid Jona
  - (Poland) Lars Skupien
  - (Poland) Mateusz Tudziez
  - (Poland) Milosz Wypior
- Team Manager:
  - (Poland) Piotr Zyto

2017 Squad

- Seniors:
  - (Australia) Jake Allen
  - (Poland) Rafal Szombierski
  - (Poland) Damian Balinski
  - (Poland) Tobiasz Musielak
  - (Russia) Grigory Laguta
  - (Australia) Max Fricke
  - (Sweden) Fredrik Lindgren
- Under-21 juniors:
  - (Poland) Robert Chmiel
  - (Poland) Lars Skupien
  - (Poland) Kacper Woryna
- Team Manager:
  - (Poland) Miroslaw Korbel

2016 Squad

- Seniors:
  - (Poland) Rafal Szombierski
  - (Poland) Damian Balinski
  - (Poland) (Norway) Rune Holta
  - (Australia) Dakota North
  - (Russia) Grigory Laguta
  - (Australia) Max Fricke
  - (Sweden) Andreas Jonsson
  - (Australia) Troy Batchelor
  - (Poland) Roman Chromik
  - (Russia) Ilja Czalov
- Under-21 juniors:
  - (Poland) Robert Chmiel
  - (Poland) Michal Schmidt
  - (Poland) Kamil Wieczorek
  - (Poland) Kacper Woryna
- Team Manager:
  - (Poland) Piotr Zyto

2015 Squad

- Seniors:
  - (Poland) Rafal Szombierski
  - (Poland) Damian Balinski
  - (Australia) Troy Batchelor
  - (Australia) Dakota North
  - (Russia) Ilja Czalov
  - (Australia) Max Fricke
  - (Germany) Valentin Grobauer
  - (United Kingdom) Chris Harris
  - (Poland) Sebastian Ulamek
- Under-21 juniors:
  - (Poland) Robert Chmiel
  - (Poland) Michal Schmidt
  - (Poland) Kamil Wieczorek
  - (Poland) Kacper Woryna
- Team Manager:
  - (Poland) Jan Grabowski

2014 Squad

- Seniors: (Average points per: ¦ heat ¦ meeting ¦)
  - (Poland) Rafal Szombierski ¦ 1,760 ¦ 5,29 ¦
  - (Poland) Roman Chromik ¦ 0,000 ¦ 0,00 ¦
  - (United Kingdom) Chris Harris ¦ 1,605 ¦ 6,50 ¦
  - (Australia) Dakota North ¦ 1,804 ¦ 8,44 ¦
  - (Russia) Ilja Czalov ¦ 1,489 ¦ 6,89 ¦
  - (Czech Republic) Vaclav Milik ¦ 1,871 ¦ 7,57 ¦
  - (Poland) Dawid Stachyra ¦ 0,944 ¦ 3,00 ¦
  - (United Kingdom) Lewis Bridger ¦ 1,535 ¦ 6,78 ¦
  - (Poland) Michal Szczepaniak ¦ 1,750 ¦ 7,50 ¦
  - (Poland) Oskar Polis ¦ 1,381 ¦ 4,17 ¦
  - (Poland) Kamil Adamczewski ¦ 0,333 ¦ 1,00 ¦
- Under-21 juniors: (Average points per: ¦ heat ¦ meeting ¦)
  - (Poland) Marcin Bubel ¦ 0,727 ¦ 1,50 ¦
  - (Poland) Robert Chmiel
  - (Poland) Michal Schmidt
  - (Poland) Kamil Wieczorek ¦ 1,000 ¦ 2,33 ¦
  - (Poland) Kacper Woryna ¦ 1,915 ¦ 7,07 ¦
- Team Manager:
  - (Poland) Jan Grabowski

2013 Squad

- Team: (Average points per: ¦ heat ¦ meeting ¦)
  - (Poland) Roman Chromik ¦ 1,923 ¦ 7,86 ¦
  - (Poland) Michal Mitko ¦ 1,810 ¦ 7,31 ¦
  - (United Kingdom) Lewis Bridger ¦ 2,258 ¦ 10,77 ¦
  - (Russia) Ilja Czalov ¦ 2,346 ¦ 10,82 ¦
  - (Czech Republic) Vaclav Milik ¦ 2,171 ¦ 10,14 ¦
  - (Germany) Christian Hefenbrock
  - (Russia) Viktor Kulakov ¦ 1,455 ¦ 5,38 ¦
  - (Australia) Sam Masters
  - (Poland) Lukasz Bojarski ¦ 1,750 ¦ 6,00 ¦
  - (Poland) Slawomir Pyszny ¦ 0,000 ¦ 0,00 ¦
  - (Poland) Zbigniew Czerwinski
  - (Poland) Marcel Kajzer ¦ 1,833 ¦ 4,00 ¦
  - (Poland) Remigiusz Perzyński ¦ 0,000 ¦ 0,00 ¦
  - (Poland) Bartosz Szymura ¦ 0,000 ¦ 0,00 ¦
  - (Poland) Mike Trzensiok ¦ 1,300 ¦ 4,00 ¦
  - (Poland) Marcin Bubel ¦ 1,875 ¦ 6,50 ¦
  - (Poland) Lukasz Witoszek
  - (Poland) Patryk Malitowski ¦ 1,267 ¦ 4,25 ¦
  - (Poland) Alex Zgardziński ¦ 1,700 ¦ 5,00 ¦
  - (Poland) Kacper Woryna ¦ 1,469 ¦ 4,21 ¦
- Team Manager:
  - (Poland) Jan Grabowski

2012 Squad

- Seniors: (Average points per: ¦ heat ¦ meeting ¦)
  - (United Kingdom) Oliver Allen ¦ 2,115 ¦ 9,82 ¦
  - (Poland) Roman Chromik ¦ 1,988 ¦ 9,81 ¦
  - (Poland) Jacek Rempała ¦ 1,714 ¦ 7,77 ¦
  - (Poland) Mariusz Firlej ¦ 1,549 ¦ 6,64 ¦
  - (Poland) Adrian Szewczykowski ¦ 1,444 ¦ 5,79 ¦
  - (Australia) Jason Doyle ¦ 2,200 ¦ 10,00 ¦
  - (Sweden) Pontus Aspgren ¦ 1,810 ¦ 6,80 ¦
  - (Denmark) Kenni Larsen
  - (Russia) Aleksiej Charczenko ¦ 1,321 ¦ 6,00 ¦
  - (Sweden) Linus Ekloef
  - (Poland) Patryk Pawlaszczyk ¦ 1,733 ¦ 7,00 ¦
  - (Poland) Bartosz Szymura ¦ 1,417 ¦ 4,67 ¦
  - (Poland) Marcin Bubel ¦ 1,067 ¦ 2,60 ¦
- Under-21 juniors: (Average points per: ¦ heat ¦ meeting ¦)
  - (Poland) Łukasz Piecha ¦ 0,706 ¦ 2,00 ¦
  - (Denmark) Mikkel Bech Jensen ¦ 1,955 ¦ 9,50 ¦
  - (Denmark) Marc Randrup ¦ 0,286 ¦ 1,00 ¦
  - (Sweden) Matthias Thoernblom ¦ 1,575 ¦ 7,13 ¦
  - (Poland) Mateusz Domanski ¦ 0,500 ¦ 1,00 ¦
- Team Manager:
  - (Poland) Maciej Simionkowski

2011 Squad

- Seniors:
  - (Poland) Daniel Pytel
  - (Ukraine) Andriej Karpov
  - (Poland) Roman Chromik
  - (Sweden) Antonio Lindbaeck
  - (Poland) Ronnie Jamrozy
  - (Denmark) Jesper B. Monberg
  - (Australia) Rory Schlein
  - (Poland) Adam Pawliczek
- Under-21 juniors:
  - (Ukraine) Aleksandr Loktaev
  - (Ukraine) Volodymir Tejgal
  - (Poland) Mateusz Domanski
  - (Poland) Kamil Fleger
  - (Poland) Lukasz Piecha
- Team Manager:
  - (Poland) Adam Pawliczek

2010 Squad

- Seniors:
  - (Poland) Ronnie Jamrozy
  - (Poland) Mariusz Wegrzyk
  - (Denmark) Nicolai Klindt
  - (Finland) Joonas Kylmaekorpi
  - (Sweden) Daniel Nermark
  - (Ukraine) Andriej Karpov
- Under-21 juniors:
  - (Poland) Mateusz Chochlinski
  - (Poland) Mateusz Domanski
  - (Poland) Rafal Fleger
  - (Poland) Kamil Fleger
  - (Poland) Lukasz Piecha
  - (Poland) Slawomir Pyszny
  - (Poland) Bartosz Szymura
- Team Manager:
  - (Poland) Dariusz Momot

2009 squad

- Seniors:
  - (Poland) Zbigniew Czerwinski
  - (Poland) Ronnie Jamrozy
  - (Poland) Adam Pawliczek
  - (Poland) Marcin Rempala
  - (Poland) Mariusz Wegrzyk
  - (Canada) Kyle Legault
  - (Russia) Denis Gizatullin
  - (Sweden) Ricky Kling
- Under-21 juniors:
  - (Poland) Mateusz Chochlinski
  - (Poland) Kamil Fleger
  - (Poland) Rafal Fleger
  - (Poland) Piotr Korbel
  - (Poland) Michal Mitko
  - (Poland) Lukasz Piecha
  - (Poland) Slawomir Pyszny
  - (Poland) Bartosz Szymura
- Team Manager:
  - (Poland) Adam Pawliczek

== Notable riders ==
- (Poland) Jerzy Gryt
- (Poland) Mirosław Korbel
- (Poland) Joachim Maj
- (Poland) Antoni Skupień
- (Poland) Eugeniusz Skupień
- (Poland) Stanisław Tkocz
- (Poland) Antoni Woryna
- (Poland) Kacper Woryna
- (Poland) Andrzej Wyglenda

== Honours ==
Competitions	Total	Golden medals		Silver medals		Bronze medals
Competitions	Total	Total	Years	Total	Years	Total	Years
Team (DMP) (since 1948)	23	12	1956, 1957, 1958, 1962, 1963, 1964, 1965, 1966, 1967, 1968, 1970, 1972	6	1950, 1959, 1961, 1980, 1988, 1990	5	1951, 1969, 1971, 1974, 1989
Team U-21 (MDMP) (since 1978)	9	2	2002, 2007	5	1984, 2000, 2008, 2015, 2016	2	2001, 2006
Pairs (MPPK) (since 1974)	7			1	1988	6	1973, 1974, 1975, 1985, 1990, 2006
Pairs U-21 (MMPPK) (1980 U-23; since 1983)	12	3	1983, 2003, 2008	4	1984, 2002, 2016, 2017	5	1980, 1990, 1993, 2007, 2010
Individual (IMP) (since 1948)	23	9	1947, 1958, 1964, 1965, 1966, 1968, 1969, 1971, 1973	9	1951, 1957, 1963, 1964, 1965, 1967, 1970, 1977, 1990	5	1956, 1958, 1962, 1970, 1971
Individual U-21 (MIMP) (since 1967)	6	2	1971, 2003	2	1984, 1990	2	2004, 2017
Total Polish Championship medals: 80		Gold: 28		Silver: 27		Bronze: 25
Competitions	Total	I place		II place		III place
Competitions	Total	Total	Years	Total	Years	Total	Years
European Club (KPE) (since 1998)	0
Team Cup (DPP) (?)	0
Golden Helmet (ZK) (since 1961)	16	6	1963, 1964, 1965, 1967, 1971, 1990	2	1963, 1979	8	1962, 1964, 1965, 1966, 1967, 1968, 1969, 1970
Silver Helmet U-21 (SK) (since 1966)	6	2	1972, 2015			4	1973, 2004, 2008, 2018
Bronze Helmet U-19 (BK) (1976-81; since 1983)	11	5	1977, 1978, 2000, 2001, 2005	3	1978, 2007, 2015	3	1996, 2007, 2014
