= Andrzej Wyglenda =

Polish speedway rider

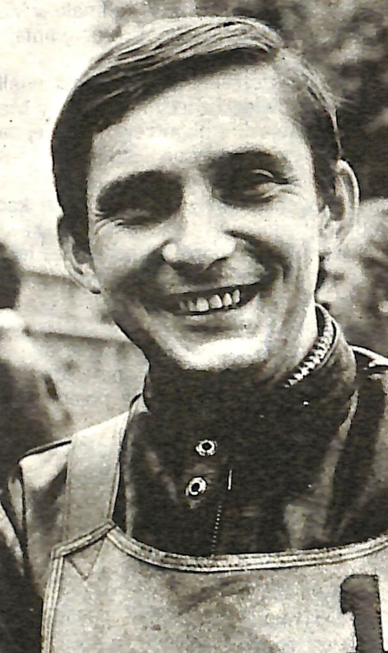
- Born: 4 May 1941 (age 85); Rybnik, Poland
- Nationality: Polish

Career history

Poland
- 1960–1976: Górnik/ROW Rybnik

Individual honours
- 1964, 1968, 1969, 1973: Polish Champion
- 1965, 1967: Continental Champion
- 1967: European Champion
- 1964: Golden Helmet Winner

Team honours
- 1971: World Pairs Champion
- 1965, 1966, 1969: World Team Cup
- 1962, 1963, 1964, 1965, 1966, 1967, 1968, 1970, 1972: Polish League Champion

Andrzej Wyglenda (born 4 May 1941 in Rybnik, Poland) is a former motorcycle speedway rider from Poland.

== Career ==
Wyglenda has won 1971 Speedway World Pairs Championship and Speedway World Team Cup three times. He also won Individual Polish Champion title four times.

Wyglenda was part of the Górnik/ROW Rybnik team that dominated the Team Speedway Polish Championship during the 1960s and were rewarded with a United Kingdom tour in 1965 and a tour with the Polish national team in 1967.

Between 1985 and 1989, Wyglenda was a Member of the Sejm of Poland.

== World Final appearances ==
=== Individual World Championship ===
- 1964 – (Sweden) Gothenburg, Ullevi – 12th – 4pts
- 1965 – (England) London, Wembley Stadium – 15th – 2pts
- 1967 – (England) London, Wembley Stadium – 15th – 2pts
- 1969 – (England) London, Wembley Stadium – 15th – 2pts
- 1970 – (Poland) Wrocław, Olympic Stadium – 8th – 7pts
- 1973 – (Poland) Chorzów, Silesian Stadium – Reserve – 0pts

=== World Pairs Championship ===
- 1971 – (Poland) Rybnik, Rybnik Municipal Stadium (with Jerzy Szczakiel) – Winner – 30pts (15)

=== World Team Cup ===
- 1964 – (West Germany) Abensberg, Abensberg Stadion (with Andrzej Pogorzelski / Zbigniew Podlecki / Marian Kaiser / Marian Rose) – 4th – 16pts (8)
- 1965 – (West Germany) Kempten (with Antoni Woryna / Zbigniew Podlecki / Andrzej Pogorzelski) – Winner – 38pts (11)
- 1966 – (Poland) Wrocław, Olympic Stadium (with Andrzej Pogorzelski / Marian Rose / Antoni Woryna / Edmund Migoś) – Winner – 41pts (11)
- 1967 – (Sweden) Malmö, Malmö Stadion (with Antoni Woryna / Jerzy Trzeszkowski / Andrzej Pogorzelski / Zbigniew Podlecki) – 2nd – 26pts (9)
- 1968 – (England) London, Wembley Stadium (with Edmund Migoś / Paweł Waloszek / Edward Jancarz / Henryk Glücklich) – 3rd – 19pts (2)
- 1969 – (Poland) Rybnik, Rybnik Municipal Stadium (with Edward Jancarz / Stanisław Tkocz / Henryk Glücklich / Andrzej Pogorzelski) – Winner – 31pts (11)
- 1971 – (Poland) Wrocław, Olympic Stadium (with Paweł Waloszek / Henryk Glücklich / Antoni Woryna / Edward Jancarz) – 3rd – 19pts (2)

== Domestic competitions ==
Individual Polish Championship

- 1964 – Winner
- 1965 – 2nd
- 1968 – Winner
- 1969 – Winner
- 1970 – 2nd
- 1971 – 3rd
- 1973 – Winner

== Political career ==
In Polish legislative election on 13 October 1985 he was a candidate of the Polish United Workers' Party (PZPR) to the Sejm of the People's Republic of Poland. His term was started on 13 October 1985 and was end 3 June 1989. He was a member of the Social policy, health and Sport Committee (Polish: Komisja Polityki Społecznej, Zdrowia i Kultury Fizycznej).

== See also ==
- Poland national speedway team
- Speedway in Poland
- List of Polish United Workers' Party members
