= Zygfryd Friedek =

Polish speedway rider

- Born: 19 October 1944 (age 82); Opole, Poland
- Nationality: Polish

Career history
- 1963, 1966-75: Kolejarz Opole
- 1964-65: Polonia Bydgoszcz
- 1977-79: Stal Rzeszów

Individual honours
- 1970: Speedway World Championship finalist
- 1966: Poland Silver Helmet Winner

Zygfryd Friedek (born 19 October 1944) is a former international Motorcycle speedway rider from Poland.

== Speedway career ==
Friedek reached the final of the Speedway World Championship in the 1970 Individual Speedway World Championship.

== World final appearances ==
=== Individual World Championship ===
- 1970 – (Poland) Wrocław, Olympic Stadium – 15th – 2pts
