= Henryk Glücklich =

Polish speedway rider

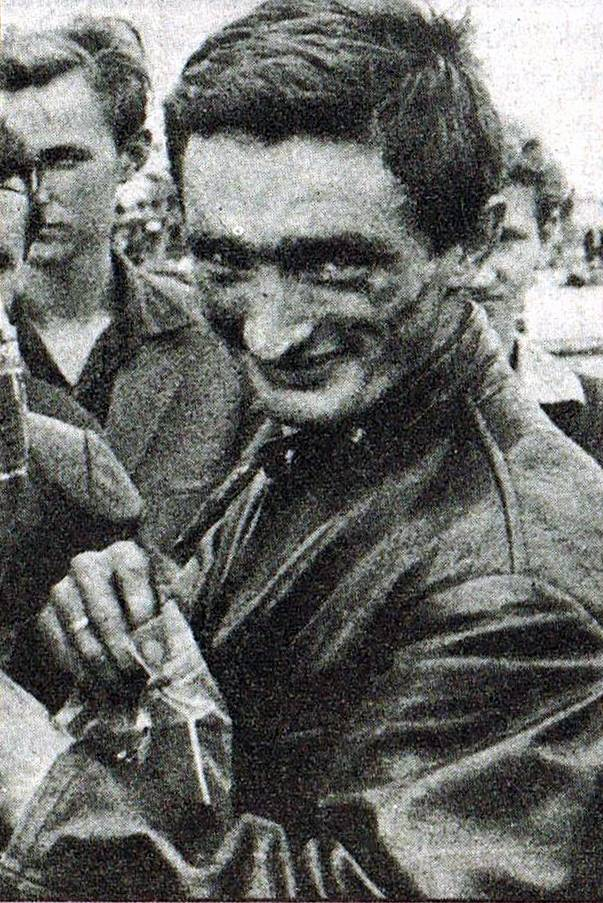
- Born: 22 January 1945
- Died: 23 September 2014 (aged 69)
- Nationality: Polish

Career history

Poland
- 1961–1962: Górnik Rybnik
- 1963–1981: Polonia Bydgoszcz

Great Britain
- 1978: Reading Racers

Individual honours
- 1971: Continental Champion

Team honours
- 1969: World Team Cup
- 1962, 1971: Polish League Winner

Henryk Glücklich (22 January 1945 – 23 September 2014) was a Polish motorcycle speedway.

== Career ==
Glücklich appeared in the Speedway World Championship finals three times, finishing fifth in 1970. He also rode in five World Team Cup finals and earned 41 international caps for the Poland speedway team.

On 11 March 1972, Glücklich set a new track record at the Rostock Speedway, recording 70.8sec.

In 1977, Leicester Lions unsuccessfully attempted to sign Glücklich to ride in the British leagues, but the following season he did ride for Reading Racers for the 1978 season.

== World Final appearances ==
=== Individual World Championship ===
- 1969 – (England) London, Wembley Stadium - 12th - 5pts
- 1970 – (Poland) Wrocław, Olympic Stadium - 5th - 9pts
- 1975 – (England) London, Wembley Stadium - 16th - 0pts

=== World Team Cup ===
- 1968 – (England) London, Wembley Stadium (with Andrzej Wyglenda / Edmund Migoś / Paweł Waloszek / Edward Jancarz) - 3rd - 19pts (2)
- 1969 – (Poland) Rybnik, Rybnik Municipal Stadium (with Edward Jancarz / Andrzej Wyglenda / Stanislaw Tkocz / Andrzej Pogorzelski) - Winner - 31pts (3)
- 1970 – (England) London, Wembley Stadium (with Antoni Woryna / Jan Mucha / Paweł Waloszek / Edmund Migoś) - 3rd - 20pts (3)
- 1971 – (Poland) Wrocław, Olympic Stadium (with Paweł Waloszek / Antoni Woryna / Edward Jancarz / Andrzej Wyglenda) - 3rd - 19pts (4)
- 1972 – (West Germany) Olching, Olching Speedwaybahn (with Zenon Plech / Paweł Waloszek / Marek Cieślak / Zdzisław Dobrucki) - 3rd - 21pts (6)
- 1975 – (West Germany) Norden, Motodrom Halbemond (with Zenon Plech / Edward Jancarz / Marek Cieslak / Jerzy Rembas) - 4th - 9pt (2)
