= Rybnik Stadium =

Polish motorcycle speedway and football stadium

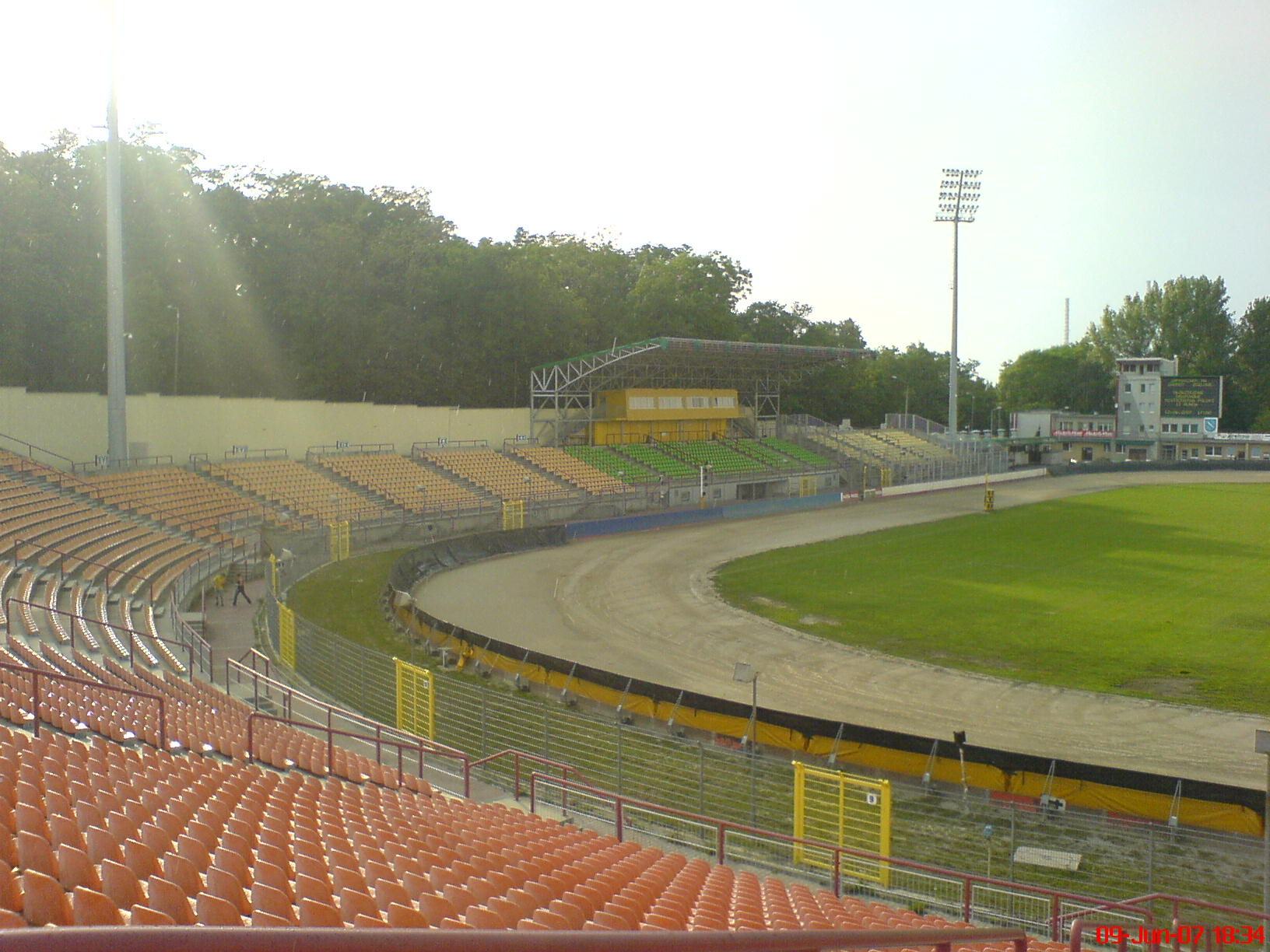
- Location: Gliwicka 72, 44-200 Rybnik, Poland
- Coordinates: 50°06′31″N 18°32′53″E
- Capacity: 10,304
- Operator: KS ROW Rybnik; Motorcycle speedway
- Opened: June 1939
- Length: 0.357 km (0.222 mi)
- Race lap record: 62.1 sec (Grzegorz Zengota, 16 April 2022)

Rybnik Stadium (Polish - Stadion Miejski w Rybniku) is a motorcycle speedway and association football stadium located in the northern part of Rybnik off Gliwicka 72. The stadium is the home arena of Polish speedway team KS ROW Rybnik who compete in the Team Speedway Polish Championship. The capacity is 10,304 (all seated) and the stadium forms part of the wider complex known as the Municipal Sports and Recreation Center.

== History ==
The stadium opened in June 1939 and underwent significant redevelopment in the winter of 2000, the track was rebuilt, a new drainage system was installed and renovation of the stands took place. Further improvements were made to the football pitch in 2013 to meet the requirements of the Polish Football Association.

The stadium has hosted concerts and major speedway events including -

- 1969 Speedway World Team Cup
- 1971 Speedway World Pairs Championship
- 1985 Speedway World Pairs Championship
