= Zygmunt Pytko =

Polish speedway rider

- Born: 10 June 1937; Nieciecza, Poland
- Died: 16 March 1996 (aged 58); Chicago, United States
- Nationality: Polish

Career history
- 1957–1974: Unia Tarnów

Individual honours
- 1967: Polish Champion

Zygmunt Pytko (1937–1996) also spelt Zygmunt Pytka was an international speedway rider from Poland.

== Speedway career ==
Pytko was the champion of Poland, winning the Polish Individual Speedway Championship in 1967.

Pytko toured the United Kingdom with the Polish national side in 1967 and 1971.
