= Henryk Żyto =

Polish speedway rider (1936–2018)

- Born: 1 November 1936; Poniec, Poland
- Died: 7 March 2018 (aged 81); Gdańsk, Poland
- Nationality: Polish

Career history

Poland
- 1953-1963: Leszno
- 1965-1980: Gdańsk

Great Britain
- 1960: Coventry Bees

Individual honours
- 1960: Speedway World Championship finalist
- 1963: Polish Championship
- 1960: Midland Riders' Champion

Team honours
- 1961: World Team Cup Winner
- 1953, 1954: Polish League Champion
- 1960: Midland Cup

Henryk Żyto (1936–2018) was an international motorcycle speedway rider from Poland. He earned 32 international caps for the Poland national speedway team.

== Speedway career ==
Żyto reached the final of the Speedway World Championship in the 1960 Individual Speedway World Championship. Also in 1960, he rode for Coventry Bees in the British speedway leagues, during the 1960 Speedway National League and won both the Midland Riders' Championship and the Midland Cup.

Żyto was the Polish champion during the 1963 Polish speedway season, after he won gold medal at the Polish Individual Speedway Championship.

== World final appearances ==
=== Individual World Championship ===
- 1960 - (England) London, Wembley Stadium - 13th - 4pts
- 1962 - (England) London, Wembley Stadium - Reserve, did not ride

=== World Team Cup ===
- 1961 - (Poland) Wrocław, Olympic Stadium (with Marian Kaiser / Mieczysław Połukard / Florian Kapała / Stanisław Tkocz) - Winner - 32pts (12)
- 1963 - (Austria) Vienna, Stadion Wien (with Andrzej Pogorzelski / Marian Kaiser / Joachim Maj / Stanisław Tkocz) - 4th - 7pts (4)
