= Andrzej Pogorzelski =

Polish motorcycle speedway rider and coach (1938–2020)

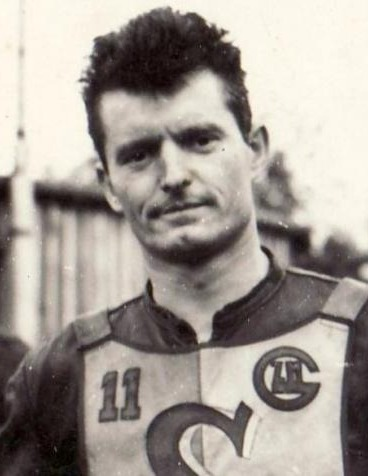
- Born: 12 October 1938; Leszno, Poland
- Died: 16 October 2020 (aged 82)
- Nickname: Puzon
- Nationality: Polish

Career history

Poland
- 1956, 1973–1976: Unia Leszno
- 1957–1961: Start Gniezno
- 1962–1972: Stal Gorzów Wielkopolski

Individual honours
- 1966: Continental Champion
- 1966: Golden Helmet

Team honours
- 1965, 1966, 1969: World Team Cup Winner
- 1969: Polish League Champion

Andrzej Pogorzelski (12 October 1938 – 16 October 2020) was a Polish motorcycle speedway rider and coach.

== Career ==
Pogorzelski started his career in Unia Leszno and represented the club in 1956 and 1973-1976 seasons. While at Unia Leszno he won two bronze medals (1975, 1976) on Team Speedway Polish Championship. During the 1957-1961 seasons, he rode in Start Gniezno and moved to Stal Gorzów Wielkopolski in winter 1962. While in Stal he won one gold (1969) and five silver (1964, 1965, 1966, 1968, 1971) medals in Team Speedway Polish Championship.

During riding for Stal, Pogorzelski held double record of the track in Gorzów Wielkopolski in seasons 1964 (76.4 sec - 18/10/1964) and 1969 (73.3 sec - 18/05/1969).

Pogorzelski won three bronze medals in the Polish Individual Speedway Championship (1964, 1965, 1966). He also won the Golden Helmet tournament in 1966, in 1964 (2nd place), 1965 (2nd place) and 1969 (2nd place), and was finalist in the Silver Helmet tournament of the season 1962 (3rd place).

=== International appearances ===
Pogorzelski was a six-time finalist of the Speedway World Team Cup, where together with the Polish National Team, he won three gold (1965, 1966, 1969) and one silver medal (1967), and finished in fourth place twice (1963, 1964).

Pogorzelski was a finalist of the Speedway World Championship in 1965 (ninth place), 1966 (12th place), 1967 (ninth place) and 1969 (ninth place). Pogorzelski toured the United Kingdom with the Polish national team in 1966.

== After retirement ==
After his career he competed in the many tournaments among others, for example in Edward Jancarz Memorial and he won significant achievements as a speedway coach.

Pogorzelski died on 16 October 2020, aged 82.

== Monuments and plaques ==
A commemorative plaque for Pogorzelski at the Stal's Edward Jancarz Stadium unveiled on 18 December 2015.

== World Final Appearances ==
=== Individual World Championship ===
- 1965 - (England) London, Wembley Stadium - 9th - 7pts
- 1966 - (Sweden) Gothenburg, Ullevi - 12th - 5pts
- 1967 - (England) London, Wembley Stadium - 9th - 6pts
- 1969 - (England) London, Wembley Stadium - 9th - 7pts

=== World Team Cup ===
- 1963 - (Austria) Vienna, Stadion Wien (with Henryk Żyto / Marian Kaiser / Joachim Maj / Stanisław Tkocz) - 4th - 7pts (0)
- 1964 - (West Germany) Abensberg, Abensberg Speedwaystadion (with Zbigniew Podlecki / Andrzej Wyglenda / Marian Kaiser / Marian Rose) - 4th - 16pts (3)
- 1965 - (West Germany) Kempten (with Andrzej Wyglenda / Zbigniew Podlecki / Antoni Woryna) - Winner - 38pts (11)
- 1966 - (Poland) Wrocław, Olympic Stadium (with Andrzej Wyglenda / Antoni Woryna / Marian Rose / Edmund Migoś) - Winner - 41pts (8)
- 1967 - (Sweden) Malmö, Malmö Stadion (with Jerzy Trzeszkowski / Antoni Woryna / Andrzej Wyglenda / Zbigniew Podlecki) - 2nd - 26pts (0)
- 1969 - (Poland) Rybnik, Rybnik Municipal Stadium (with Edward Jancarz / Stanisław Tkocz / Andrzej Wyglenda / Henryk Glücklich) - 'Winner - 31pts (2)
