= Marian Kaiser =

Polish speedway rider

- Born: 14 January 1933; Kołodziejewo, Poland
- Died: 10 April 1991 (aged 58); Regensburg, Switzerland
- Nationality: Polish

Career history

Poland
- 1950-1952: Gorzów
- 1953: Świętochłowice
- 1953-1954: Wrocław
- 1955-1959: Warszawa
- 1960-1966: Gdańsk

Great Britain
- 1959: Leicester Hunters

Individual honours
- 1960, 1966: Speedway World Championship finalist
- 1957: Polish Championship
- 1960: European Champion
- 1962: Continental Champion
- 1962: Poland Golden Helmet Winner

Team honours
- 1961: World Team Cup Winner

Marian Kaiser (14 January 1933 – 10 April 1991) was an international motorcycle speedway rider from Poland. He earned 31 international caps for the Poland national speedway team.

== Speedway career ==
Kaiser reached the final of the Speedway World Championship on two occasions, in the 1960 Individual Speedway World Championship and the 1966 Individual Speedway World Championship.

In 1956, Kaiser toured the United Kingdom with the Polish team, which cost £2,000 to organise and was paid by the Polish Motor Club and British authorities. He was the Polish champion in 1957 after he won gold at the Polish Individual Speedway Championship. Kaiser reached the 1958 European Final as part of the 1958 Individual Speedway World Championship.

Coventry Bees promoter Charles Ochiltree unsuccessfully attempted to sign Kaiser out of retirement in 1968.

== World final appearances ==
=== Individual World Championship ===
- 1960 - (England) London, Wembley Stadium - 15th - 1pt
- 1966 – (Sweden) Gothenburg, Ullevi – 11th – 5pts

=== World Team Cup ===
- 1960 - (Sweden) Göteborg, Ullevi (with Konstanty Pociejkewicz / Mieczysław Połukard / Jan Malinowski) - 4th - 7pts (2)
- 1961 - (Poland) Wrocław, Olympic Stadium (with Mieczysław Połukard / Henryk Żyto / Florian Kapała / Stanisław Tkocz) - Winner - 32pts (10)
- 1962 - (Czechoslovakia) Slaný (with Mieczysław Połukard / Florian Kapała / Joachim Maj / Paweł Waloszek) - 3rd - 20pts (9)
- 1963 - (Austria) Vienna, Stadion Wien (with Andrzej Pogorzelski / Henryk Żyto / Joachim Maj / Stanisław Tkocz) - 4th - 7pts (1)
- 1964 - (West Germany) Abensberg, Abensberg Stadion (with Andrzej Wyglenda / Andrzej Pogorzelski / Zbigniew Podlecki / Marian Rose) - 4th - 16pts (0)
