= Stanisław Tkocz =

Polish speedway rider

- Born: 6 November 1936; Rybnik, Poland
- Died: 19 May 2016 (aged 79)
- Nationality: Polish

Career history
- 1955–1971: Górnik/ROW Rybnik
- 1972: Kolejarz Opole

Individual honours
- 1961, 1966: Speedway World Championship finalist
- 1958, 1965: Polish champion
- 1963: Continental Champion
- 1965: Poland Golden Helmet Winner

Team honours
- 1961, 1969: World Team Cup Winner
- 1956, 1957, 1958 1962, 1963, 1964 1965, 1966, 1967 1968, 1970: Polish League Champion

Stanisław Tkocz (1936–2016) was an international speedway rider from Poland.

== Speedway career ==
Tkocz reached the final of the Speedway World Championship on two occasions in the 1961 Individual Speedway World Championship and the 1966 Individual Speedway World Championship.

Tkocz was a two times Polish champion after he won gold at the Polish Individual Speedway Championship in 1958 and 1965. Tkocz reached the 1958 European Final as part of the 1958 Individual Speedway World Championship.

Tkocz was part of the Górnik/ROW Rybnik team that dominated the Team Speedway Polish Championship during the 1960s and were rewarded with United Kingdom tours in 1965 and 1966.

== World final appearances ==
=== Individual World Championship ===
- 1961 – (Sweden) Malmö, Malmö Stadion – 15th – 3pts
- 1966 – (Sweden) Gothenburg, Ullevi – 9th – 7pts

=== World Team Cup ===
- 1961 – (Poland) Wrocław, Olympic Stadium (with Marian Kaiser / Henryk Żyto / Mieczysław Połukard / Florian Kapała) – Winner – 32pts (4)
- 1963 – (Austria) Vienna, Stadion Wien (with Henryk Żyto / Marian Kaiser / Joachim Maj / Andrzej Pogorzelski) – 4th – 7pts (1)
- 1969 – (Poland) Rybnik, Rybnik Municipal Stadium (with Edward Jancarz / Andrzej Wyglenda / Henryk Glücklich / Andrzej Pogorzelski) – Winner – 31pts (4)
