= Karpaty Krosno =

Polish football club

- Full name: Krośnieński Klub Sportowy Karpaty Krosno (Krosno Sports Club Carpathia Krosno)
- Nickname: Karpaciarze (The Carpathians)
- Founded: 1928; 98 years ago (as MKS Legia); 9 July 2026; 11 days ago (refounded as KKS Karpaty)
- Ground: Legionów Street Stadium
- Capacity: 5,531
- Chairman: Waldemar Wojnar
- Manager: Tomasz Wacek
- League: Klasa A Krosno II
- 2025–26: IV liga Subcarpathia, 6th of 18 (withdrawn at the end of the season)
- Website: http://karpatykrosno.com
Home colours	Away colours

KS Karpaty Krosno is a Polish sports club based in Krosno. The name "Karpaty" refers to the Carpathian Mountains.

== History ==
=== Football ===
The club was established in 1928.

The football section has played in the lower divisions of Polish football throughout history. They have never played in the top flight, however they had four spells in the second tier: between the 1951–1953 seasons (under the name of Włókniarz Krosno), 1957-1963–64 (under the names of Legia Krosno, MZKS Krosno and Karpaty Krosno), 1987–88 and 1988–89, and also 1991–92 to 1994–95. The well-known Polish manager Orest Lenczyk coached Karpaty in the early days of his career, from 1970 to 1971. Former Stal Mielec legend Marian Kosiński was the manager in 1989–90 and 1991–92 seasons.

Their biggest success to date is the 1992–93 season where they achieved a 4th place league finish and the 1/16th finals of the Polish Cup, eventually losing to Legia Warsaw 1–3 on 21 October.

In the 2022–23 season, Karpaty finished as runners-up in the Subcarpathian IV liga, overtaken by Cosmos Nowotaniec. On 3 July 2023, the Subcarpathian Football Association announced that Karpaty had been promoted to the III liga, group IV, due to Cosmos' resignation from competing in the division. In the first season (2023–24), the team was relegated back to the IV liga. After finishing sixth in the 2025–26 season, Karpaty withdrew from the IV liga Subcarpathia, citing financial reasons, and eventually disbanded. In July 2026, after undergoing management and ownership changes, the club was admitted to compete in the Klasa A as a new entity under the name of KKS Karpaty Krosno.

=== Speedway ===
From 1962 to 1969 speedway was held at the stadium, under the club's name Karpaty Krosno. The team competed in the second division and achieved a best place finish of third in the 1963 Polish speedway season. However, in 1969, due to financial problems, the team's activities were suspended.

== Fans ==
Despite little success on the field, Karpaty have a small but loyal support, at both volleyball and football matches.

The football fan movement in Krosno started in the 1987–88 season, when the club was promoted to the second division. They have friendly contacts with fans of Glinik Gorlice, Unia Tarnów, Nafta Jedlicze, Stal Rzeszów, Hungarian team Zalegeszereg and until 2002, Widzew Łódź^{[1]}. The team currently has from 50 to 250 active supporters per game, but that number can rise up to 600 for important matches.

Their biggest rival is Stal Sanok. The first derby match was played on 26 May 1957 in Krosno in the third division, under the names of Legia Krosno and Sanoczanka Sanok. Their other fierce rival is Czarni Jasło, where tensions frequently flare up between the fans. The club is in close proximity to a number of clubs playing at the similar levels in the region and therefore contest many local rivalries: Sandecja Nowy Sącz, Wisłoka Dębica, Stal Mielec, JKS Jarosław, Brzozovia Brzozów, Sanovia Lesko and Resovia.

== See also ==
- Krosno
- Football in Poland
- List of football clubs in Poland
