= Joachim Maj =

Polish speedway rider (1932–2019)

- Born: 21 August 1932; Borowa Wieś, Poland
- Died: 20 April 2019 (aged 86)
- Nationality: Polish

Career history
- 1951-1952, 1955-1969: Górnik/ROW Rybnik
- 1953-1954: CWKS Wrocław

Individual honours
- 1963: Poland Golden Helmet Winner

Team honours
- 1962: Speedway World Team Cup bronze medal
- 1956, 1957, 1958, 1962, 1963, 1964, 1965, 1966, 1967, 1968: Polish League Champion

Joachim Maj (21 August 1932 – 20 April 2019) was an international speedway rider from Poland.

== Speedway career ==
Maj reached the 1958 European Final as part of the 1958 Individual Speedway World Championship.

Maj reached the final of the Speedway World Team Cup in the 1962 Speedway World Team Cup where he won a bronze medal.

Maj was part of the Górnik/ROW Rybnik team that dominated the Team Speedway Polish Championship during the 1960s, and were rewarded with a United Kingdom tour in 1965.

== World final appearances ==
=== World Team Cup ===
- 1962 - (Czech Republic) Slaný (with Marian Kaiser / Florian Kapała / Paweł Waloszek / Mieczysław Połukard) - 3rd - 20pts (4)
- 1963 - (Austria) Vienna, Stadion Wien (with Andrzej Pogorzelski / Marian Kaiser / Henryk Żyto / Stanisław Tkocz) - 4th - 7pts (1)
