= Jan Mucha (speedway rider) =

Polish speedway rider

- Born: 16 May 1941; Mikołów, Poland
- Died: 15 May 2014 (aged 72)
- Nationality: Polish

Career history
- 1961–1979: Śląsk Świętochłowice

Individual honours
- 1970: Poland Golden Helmet Winner

Jan Mucha (16 May 1941 – 15 May 2014) was a Polish motorcycle speedway rider. He appeared in the Speedway World Championship finals four times.

== Career ==
Mucha was born in Mikołów, Poland. He raced in the Team Speedway Polish Championship for Śląsk Świętochłowice from 1961 to 1979.

Mucha missed the 1973 World Taam Cup final after sustaining an artery injury during practice for the event. He crashed with the world champion at the time Jerzy Szczakiel.

== World Final appearances ==
=== Individual World Championship ===
- 1969 – (England) London, Wembley Stadium - 10th - 7pts
- 1970 – (Poland) Wrocław, Olympic Stadium - 11th - 6pts
- 1973 – (Poland) Chorzów, Silesian Stadium - 9th - 7pts
- 1977 – (Sweden) Gothenburg, Ullevi - 16th - 1pt

=== World Team Cup ===
- 1970 – (England) London, Wembley Stadium (with Antoni Woryna / Paweł Waloszek / Edmund Migoś / Henryk Glücklich) - 3rd - 20pts (6)
- 1974 – (Poland) Chorzów, Silesian Stadium (with Zenon Plech / Andrzej Jurczynski / Andrzej Tkocz / Jerzy Szczakiel) - 3rd - 13pt (4)
