= Antoni Woryna =

Polish speedway rider

- Born: 15 February 1941; Rybnik, Poland
- Died: 14 December 2001 (aged 60)
- Nationality: Polish

Career history

Poland
- 1960–1972, 1975: Górnik/ROW Rybnik

Great Britain
- 1973–1974: Poole Pirates

Individual honours
- 1966: Polish Champion
- 1969: Continental Champion
- 1967: Poland Golden Helmet Winner

Team honours
- 1965, 1966: World Team Cup Winner
- 1962, 1963, 1964, 1965, 1966, 1967, 1968, 1970, 1972: Polish League Champion

Antoni Woryna (15 February 1941 – 14 December 2001) was a Polish motorcycle speedway rider. He appeared in the Speedway World Championship finals five times. He earned 47 international caps for the Poland national speedway team.

== Career ==
Woryna began his speedway career with Rybnik during the 1965 Polish speedway season. He would remain with the club for his entire Polish league career. He was part of the Górnik/ROW Rybnik team that dominated the Team Speedway Polish Championship during the 1960s and were rewarded with United Kingdom tours in 1965, 1966 and 1967.

Woryna was the first Polish rider to win a medal at Speedway World Championship, when he won the bronze medal at the 1966 Individual Speedway World Championship. He was also a member of the Polish World Team Cup winning teams of 1965 and 1966.

Woryna rode in Great Britain from 1973 to 1974, after joining the Poole Pirates.

== World Final Appearances ==
=== Individual World Championship ===
- 1965 - (England) London, Wembley Stadium - 10th - 6pts
- 1966 - (Sweden) Gothenburg, Ullevi - 3rd - 13pts
- 1967 - (England) London, Wembley Stadium - 11th - 5pts
- 1968 - (Sweden) Gothenburg, Ullevi - 12th - 5pts
- 1970 - (Poland) Wrocław, Olympic Stadium - 3rd - 13pts

=== World Team Cup ===
- 1965 - (West Germany) Kempten, Illerstadion (with Andrzej Wyglenda / Zbigniew Podlecki / Andrzej Pogorzelski) - Winner - 38pts (9)
- 1966 - (Poland) Wrocław, Olympic Stadium (with Andrzej Wyglenda / Andrzej Pogorzelski / Marian Rose / Edmund Migoś) - Winner - 41pts (11)
- 1967 - (Sweden) Malmö, Malmö Stadion (with Jerzy Trzeszkowski / Andrzej Pogorzelski / Andrzej Wyglenda / Zbigniew Podlecki) - 2nd - 26pts (10)
- 1970 - (England) London, Wembley Stadium (with Jan Mucha / Paweł Waloszek / Edmund Migoś / Henryk Glücklich) - 3rd - 20pts (5)
- 1971 - (Poland) Wrocław, Olympic Stadium (with Paweł Waloszek / Henryk Glücklich / Edward Jancarz / Andrzej Wyglenda) - 3rd - 19pts (4)
