= 2005 Mieczysław Połukard Criterium of Polish Speedway Leagues Aces =

Polish speedway event

2005 Criterium of Aces

Seasons
- ← 2004 2006 →

The 24th Mieczysław Połukard Criterium of Polish Speedway League Aces was the 2005 version of the Mieczysław Połukard Criterium of Polish Speedway Leagues Aces. It took place on March 28 in the Polonia Stadium in Bydgoszcz, Poland.

== Starting positions draw ==
1. Jacek Krzyżaniak - Budlex-Polonia Bydgoszcz
2. Grzegorz Walasek - Złomrex-Włókniarz Częstochowa
3. Krzysztof Kasprzak - Unia Leszno
4. Rune Holta - Złomrex-Włókniarz Częstochowa
5. Piotr Protasiewicz - Budlex-Polonia Bydgoszcz
6. Mariusz Staszewski - ZKŻ Kronopol Zielona Góra
7. Tomasz Jędrzejak - KM Intar Ostrów Wlkp.
8. Robert Miśkowiak - Atlas Wrocław
9. Robert Kościecha - Lotos Gdańsk
10. Robert Sawina - Budlex-Polonia Bydgoszcz
11. Jarosław Hampel - Atlas Wrocław
12. Wiesław Jaguś - Apator-Adriana Toruń
13. Andrzej Huszcza - ZKŻ Kronopol Zielona Góra
14. Michał Robacki - Budlex-Polonia Bydgoszcz
15. Adrian Miedziński - Apator-Adriana Toruń
16. Rafał Okoniewski - ZKŻ Kronopol Zielona Góra
17. (R1) Krzysztof Buczkowski - Budlex-Polonia Bydgoszcz
18. (R2) Marcin Jędrzejewski - Budlex-Polonia Bydgoszcz

== Heat details ==
Placing	Rider	Total	1	2	3	4	5	6	7	8	9	10	11	12	13	14	15	16	17	18	19	20	Pts	Pos	21
1	(4) Rune Holta (CZE)	12	0							3				3				3				3	12	1	3
2	(3) Krzysztof Kasprzak (LES)	12	1						3				3				3				2		12	2	2
3	(6) Mariusz Staszewski (ZIE)	11		2				3			1							2			3		11	3	
4	(5) Piotr Protasiewicz (BYD)	10		3			2					3					E					2	10	4	
5	(11) Jarosław Hampel (WRO)	10			3				2		3					1						1	10	5	
6	(10) Robert Sawina (BYD)	10			1			2						2			2		3				10	6	
7	(2) Grzegorz Walasek (CZE)	9	2					0				2				2				3			9	7	
8	(12) Wiesław Jaguś (TOR)	8			2					2		1			3						E		8	8	
9	(1) Jacek Krzyżaniak (BYD)	7	3				0				2				F/X				2				7	9	
10	(7) Tomasz Jędrzejak (OST)	7		1					1					1	2					2			7	10	
11	(9) Robert Kościecha (GDA)	6			0		3						2					0		1			6	11	
12	(8) Robert Miśkowiak (WRO)	5		0						1			1			3			0				5	12	
13	(13) Andrzej Huszcza (ZIE)	5				3	1							0		0					1		5	13	
14	(14) Michał Robacki (BYD)	4				2		1					0		1							0	4	14	
15	(17) Krzysztof Buczkowski (BYD)	2				1				0	0						1			0			2	15	
16	(15) Adrian Miedziński (TOR)	2				X			0			0						1	1				2	16	
17	(16) Rafał Okoniewski (ZIE)	0				F/-				-	-						-			-			0	17	
-	(18) Marcin Jędrzejewski (BYD)	0																					0	-	
Placing	Rider	Total	1	2	3	4	5	6	7	8	9	10	11	12	13	14	15	16	17	18	19	20	Pts	Pos	21

m - exclusion for exceeding two minute time allowance • t - exclusion for touching the tapes • x - other exclusion • e - retired or mechanical failure • f - fell • ns - non-starter • nc - non-classify

gate A - inside	gate B	gate C	gate D - outside

== Sources ==
- Roman Lach - Polish Speedway Almanac
