= Mieczysław Połukard Criterium of Polish Speedway Leagues Aces =

Polish speedway event

Criterium of Aces
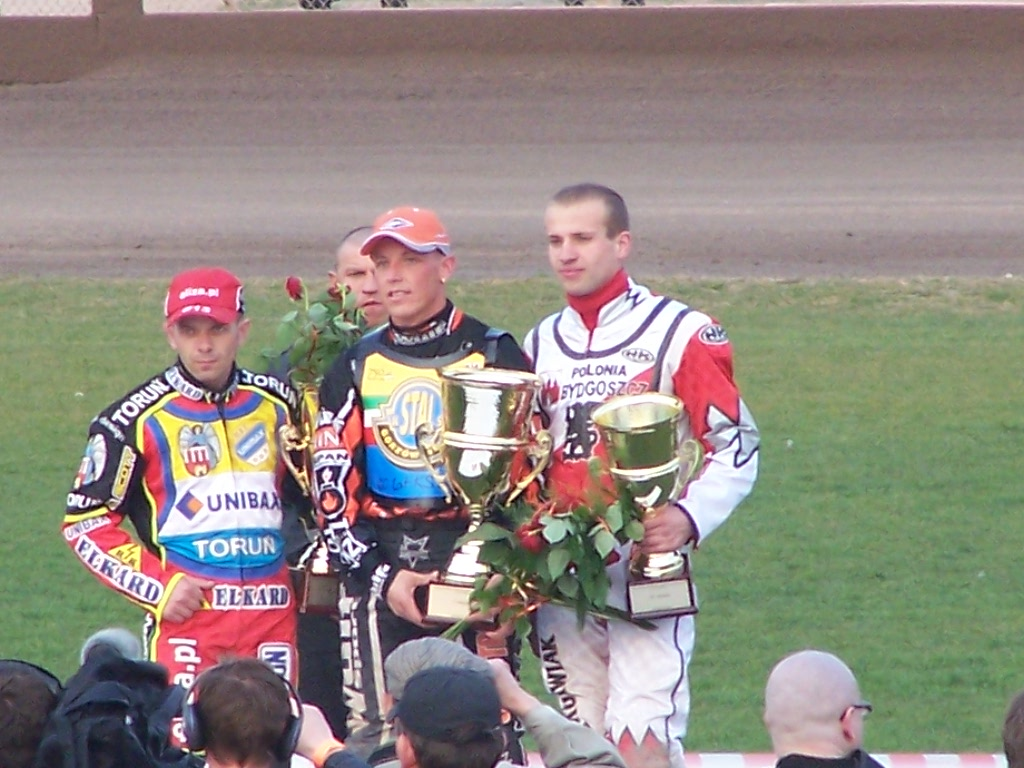
- 2007 Podium: Jaguś, Ferjan and Szczepaniak
- Sport: Motorcycle speedway
- Founded: 1951
- Most titles: Tomasz Gollob (14)

The Mieczysław Połukard Criterium of Polish Speedway League Aces (Polish: Kryterium Asów Polskich Lig Żużlowych im. Mieczysława Połukarda) usually referred to as the Criterium of Aces (Kryterium Asów) is an annual speedway event held each year organised by Polonia Bydgoszcz in forms the 'curtain raiser' (Super cup) to a season.

The Criterium of Aces is held in the Polonia Stadium in Bydgoszcz. It is seen by riders and fans as the official opening of the new season. Tomasz Gollob has won the event the most times by winning it on fourteen occasions.

First staged in 1982, although a similar meeting was held in the 1951 as Criterium of Aces (Criterium Asów). The event was not held from 2013 to 2020 but returned for the 2021 Polish speedway season.

- Unless stated all riders are Polish

== Past winners ==
Year	Date	Winners	2nd place	3rd place
1951	11 Nov 1951	Zbigniew Raniszewski; Gwardia Bydgoszcz	Janusz Suchecki; CWKS Warszawa	Kazimierz Kurek; Gwardia Bydgoszcz
1952	5 Oct 1952	Bolesław Bonin; Gwardia Bydgoszcz	Marian Kuśnierek; Leszno	Tadeusz Fijałkowski; Budowlani Warszawa
1953	1 Oct 1953	Zbigniew Raniszewski; Gwardia Bydgoszcz	Edward Kupczyński; Wrocław	Florian Kapała; Rawicz
1954	3 Oct 1954	Edward Kupczyński; Wrocław	Mieczysław Połukard; Wrocław	Zbigniew Raniszewski; Gwardia Bydgoszcz
1955	30 Oct 1955	Włodzimierz Szwendrowski; Sparta Łódź	Zbigniew Raniszewski; Gwardia Bydgoszcz	Andrzej Krzesiński; Leszno
1956	4 Nov 1956	Florian Kapała; Rawicz	Mieczysław Połukard; Gwardia Bydgoszcz	Tadeusz Teodorowicz; Wrocław
1957	8 Sep 1957	Marian Kaiser; Legia Warszawa	Jan Malinowski; Polonia Bydgoszcz	Stanisław Tkocz; Rybnik
1958	12 Oct 1958	Mieczysław Połukard; Polonia Bydgoszcz	Stanisław Rurarz; Świętochłowice	Marian Kaiser; Legia Warszawa
1959	9 Aug 1959	Stanisław Tkocz; Rybnik	Konstanty Pociejkewicz; Wrocław	Henryk Żyto; Leszno
1960	15 Oct 1960	Marian Rose; Toruń	?	?
1982	28 Mar 1982	Marek Ziarnik; Polonia Bydgoszcz	Piotr Pyszny; Rybnik	Bolesław Proch; Polonia Bydgoszcz
1983	27 Mar 1983	Andrzej Huszcza; Zielona Góra	Roman Jankowski; Leszno	Bolesław Proch; Polonia Bydgoszcz
1984	25 Mar 1984	Andrzej Huszcza; Zielona Góra	Bolesław Proch; Polonia Bydgoszcz	Edward Jancarz; Gorzów
1985	24 Mar 1985	Wojciech Żabiałowicz; Toruń	Andrzej Huszcza; Zielona Góra	Leonard Raba; Opole
Since 1986, the event has been prefixed with the Mieczysław Połukard name.
1986	23 Mar 1986	Roman Jankowski; Leszno	Grzegorz Dzikowski; Gdańsk	Wojciech Żabiałowicz; Toruń
1987	29 Mar 1987	Wojciech Żabiałowicz; Toruń	Eugeniusz Błaszak; Tarnów	Ryszard Dołomisiewicz; Polonia Bydgoszcz
1988	27 Mar 1988	Ryszard Dołomisiewicz; Polonia Bydgoszcz	Eugeniusz Skupień; Rybnik	Sławomir Drabik; Częstochowa
1989	19 Mar 1989	Roman Jankowski; Leszno	Zenon Kasprzak; Leszno	Ryszard Franczyszyn; Gorzów
1990	25 Mar 1990	Tomasz Gollob; Polonia Bydgoszcz	Piotr Świst; Gorzów	Eugeniusz Skupień; Rybnik
1991	24 Mar 1991	Tomasz Gollob; Polonia Bydgoszcz	Jan Krzystyniak; Rzeszów	Andrzej Huszcza; Zielona Góra
1992	22 Mar 1992	Tomasz Gollob; Polonia Bydgoszcz	Jan Krzystyniak; Rzeszów	Roman Jankowski; Leszno
1993	21 Mar 1993	Tomasz Gollob; Polonia Bydgoszcz	Andrzej Huszcza; Zielona Góra	Robert Sawina; Toruń
1994	27 Mar 1994	Tomasz Gollob; Polonia Bydgoszcz	Jacek Gollob; Polonia Bydgoszcz	(England) Joe Screen; Częstochowa
1995	26 Mar 1995	Tomasz Gollob; Polonia Bydgoszcz	(Czech Republic) Václav Milík, Sr. Kraków	Jacek Gomólski; Polonia Bydgoszcz
1996	4 Apr 1996	Tomasz Gollob; Polonia Bydgoszcz	Piotr Świst; Gorzów	Sebastian Ułamek; Częstochowa
1997	23 Mar 1997	Tomasz Gollob; Polonia Bydgoszcz	Jacek Gollob; Polonia Bydgoszcz	Sławomir Drabik; Częstochowa
1998	29 Mar 1998	Tomasz Gollob; Polonia Bydgoszcz	Piotr Protasiewicz; Polonia Bydgoszcz	Robert Sawina; Gniezno
1999	28 Mar 1999	Roman Jankowski; Leszno	Tomasz Gollob; Polonia Bydgoszcz	Robert Sawina; Gniezno
2000	26 Mar 2000	Tomasz Gollob; Polonia Bydgoszcz	Robert Sawina; Wrocław	Piotr Protasiewicz; Polonia Bydgoszcz
2001	31 Mar 2001	Tomasz Gollob; Polonia Bydgoszcz	Piotr Protasiewicz; Polonia Bydgoszcz	Krzysztof Cegielski; Gdańsk
2002	26 Mar 2002	Tomasz Gollob; Polonia Bydgoszcz	Piotr Protasiewicz; Polonia Bydgoszcz	Grzegorz Walasek; Częstochowa
2003	28 Mar 2003	Tomasz Gollob; Polonia Bydgoszcz	Wiesław Jaguś; Toruń	Jacek Gollob; Polonia Bydgoszcz
2004	21 Mar 2004	(Norway) Rune Holta; Częstochowa	Wiesław Jaguś; Toruń	Tomasz Bajerski; Toruń
2005	28 Mar 2005	(Norway) Rune Holta; Częstochowa	Krzysztof Kasprzak; Unia Leszno	Mariusz Staszewski; Zielona Góra
2006	2 Apr 2006	Sebastian Ułamek; Częstochowa	Robert Kościecha; Polonia Bydgoszcz	Krzysztof Buczkowski; Polonia Bydgoszcz
2007	1 Apr 2007	(Slovenia) Matej Ferjan; Gorzów	Wiesław Jaguś; Toruń	Michał Szczepaniak; Polonia Bydgoszcz
2008	30 Mar 2008	Tomasz Gollob; Gorzów	(Russia) Emil Saifutdinov; Polonia Bydgoszcz	Tomasz Chrzanowski; Gdańsk
2009	29 Mar 2009	(Sweden) Andreas Jonsson; Polonia Bydgoszcz	Piotr Protasiewicz; Zielona Góra	(Russia) Emil Saifutdinov; Polonia Bydgoszcz
2010	28 Mar 2010	(Russia) Emil Saifutdinov; Polonia Bydgoszcz	(Sweden) Antonio Lindbäck; Polonia Bydgoszcz	(Sweden) Magnus Zetterström; Gdańsk
2011	27 Mar 2011	(Russia) Emil Saifutdinov; Polonia Bydgoszcz	Tomasz Gollob; Gorzów	(Denmark) Nicki Pedersen; Gorzów
2012	1 Apr 2012	(Australia) Darcy Ward; Toruń	Maciej Janowski; Tarnów	Robert Kościecha; Polonia Bydgoszcz
2013 to 2020 not held
2021	30 Mar 2021	Bartosz Zmarzlik; Gorzów	(Russia) Vadim Tarasenko; Polonia Bydgoszcz	(Russia) Artem Laguta; Wrocław
2022	25 Mar 2022	Bartosz Zmarzlik; Gorzów	Patryk Dudek; Toruń	(Denmark) Mikkel Michelsen; Lublin
2023	26 Mar 2023	(Russia) Artem Laguta; Wrocław	Dominik Kubera; Lublin	Szymon Woźniak; Gorzów
2024	24 Mar 2024	Bartosz Zmarzlik; Lublin	Szymon Woźniak; Gorzów	(Russia) Artem Laguta; Wrocław
2025	30 Mar 2025	(Ukraine) Aleksandr Loktaev; Bydgoszcz	Krzysztof Buczkowski; Bydgoszcz	(Denmark) Mikkel Michelsen; Toruń
2026	29 Mar 2026	(Australia) Max Fricke; Grudziądz	(Russia) Emil Sayfutdinov; Toruń	(Russia) Artem Laguta; Wrocław
2027
