= 1999 Mieczysław Połukard Criterium of Polish Speedway Leagues Aces =

Polish speedway event

1999 Criterium of Aces

Seasons
- ← 1998 2000 →

The 18th Mieczysław Połukard Criterium of Polish Speedway League Aces was the 1999 version of the Mieczysław Połukard Criterium of Polish Speedway Leagues Aces. It took place on March 28 in the Polonia Stadium in Bydgoszcz, Poland.

== Starting positions draw ==
1. Roman Jankowski - Unia Leszno
2. Jacek Gollob - Ludwik-Polonia Piła
3. Sebastian Ułamek - Lotos-Wybrzeże Gdańsk
4. Robert Dados - Kunterszyn-Roleski Grudziądz
5. Piotr Protasiewicz - Jutrzenka-Polonia Bydgoszcz
6. Robert Sawina - Trilux-Start Gniezno
7. Rafał Dobrucki - Ludwik-Polonia Piła
8. Piotr Świst - KKER-Stal Rzeszów
9. Mirosław Kowalik - Apator-Netia Toruń
10. Rafał Okoniewski - Pergo Gorzów Wlkp.
11. Tomasz Gollob - Jutrzenka-Polonia Bydgoszcz
12. Grzegorz Walasek - ZKŻ Polmos Zielona Góra
13. Wiesław Jaguś - Apator-Netia Toruń
14. Jacek Krzyżaniak - Atlas Wrocław
15. Przemysław Tajchert - Jutrzenka-Polonia Bydgoszcz
16. Tomasz Bajerski - Pergo Gorzów Wlkp.
17. (R1) Tomasz Poprawski - Jutrzenka-Polonia Bydgoszcz
18. (R2) Michał Robacki - Jutrzenka-Polonia Bydgoszcz

== Heat details ==
Placing	Rider	Total	1	2	3	4	5	6	7	8	9	10	11	12	13	14	15	16	17	18	19	20	Pts	Pos	21
1	(1) Roman Jankowski (LES)	13	2				3				2				3				3				13	1	
2	(11) Tomasz Gollob (BYD)	12			2				3		1					3						3	12	3	3
3	(6) Robert Sawina (GNI)	12		0				3			3							3			3		12	2	2
4	(8) Piotr Świst (RZE)	10		1						2			3			2			2				10	4	
5	(5) Piotr Protasiewicz (BYD)	9		3			2					X					2					2	9	5	
6	(4) Robert Dados (GRU)	8	0							3				3				1				1	8	6	
7	(3) Sebastian Ułamek (GDA)	7	1						0				1				3				2		7	7	
8	(12) Grzegorz Walasek (ZIE)	7			0					1		3			2						1		7	8	
9	(10) Rafał Okoniewski (GOR)	7			3			2						X			1		1				7	9	
10	(9) Mirosław Kowalik (TOR)	7			1		F						2					2		2			7	10	
11	(2) Jacek Gollob (PIŁ)	6	3					0				E				0				3			6	11	
12	(13) Wiesław Jaguś (TOR)	5				1	1							2		1					0		5	12	
13	(14) Jacek Krzyżaniak (WRO)	4				3		1					E		-							-	4	13	
14	(7) Rafał Dobrucki (PIŁ)	4		2					2					F/-	-					-			4	14	
15	(15) Przemysław Tajchert (BYD)	3				M/-			1			2						0	0				3	15	
16	(16) Tomasz Bajerski (GOR)	2				2				0	0						0			0			2	16	
R1	(R1) Tomasz Poprawski (BYD)	0				0									0							0	0	R1	
R2	(R2) Michał Robacki (BYD)	3												1	1					1			3	R2	
Placing	Rider	Total	1	2	3	4	5	6	7	8	9	10	11	12	13	14	15	16	17	18	19	20	Pts	Pos	21

m - exclusion for exceeding two minute time allowance • t - exclusion for touching the tapes • x - other exclusion • e - retired or mechanical failure • f - fell • ns - non-starter • nc - non-classify

gate A - inside	gate B	gate C	gate D - outside

== Sources ==
- Roman Lach - Polish Speedway Almanac
