= 2004 Mieczysław Połukard Criterium of Polish Speedway Leagues Aces =

Polish speedway event

2004 Criterium of Aces

Seasons
- ← 2003 2005 →

The 23rd Mieczysław Połukard Criterium of Polish Speedway League Aces was the 2004 version of the Mieczysław Połukard Criterium of Polish Speedway Leagues Aces. It took place on March 21 in the Polonia Stadium in Bydgoszcz, Poland.

== Starting positions draw ==
1. Jacek Krzyżaniak - Polonia Bydgoszcz
2. Rafał Dobrucki - Unia Leszno
3. Tomasz Bajerski - Apator-Adriana Toruń
4. Rune Holta - Złomrex-Włókniarz Częstochowa
5. Michał Robacki - Polonia Bydgoszcz
6. Rafał Kurmański - ZKŻ Quick-Mix Zielona Góra
7. Sebastian Ułamek - Złomrex-Włókniarz Częstochowa
8. Tomasz Chrzanowski - Lotos Gdańsk
9. Wiesław Jaguś - Apator-Adriana Toruń
10. Piotr Protasiewicz - Apator-Adriana Toruń
11. Andy Smith - Polonia Bydgoszcz
12. Krzysztof Kasprzak - Unia Leszno
13. Dariusz Fijałkowski - Polonia Bydgoszcz
14. Mirosław Kowalik - Polonia Bydgoszcz
15. Tomasz Jędrzejak - KM-Intar Ostrów Wlkp.
16. Robert Sawina - Kunter-GTŻ Grudziądz
17. (R1) Grzegorz Czechowski - Polonia Bydgoszcz
18. (R2) Marcin Jędrzejewski - Polonia Bydgoszcz

== Heat details ==
Placing	Rider	Total	1	2	3	4	5	6	7	8	9	10	11	12	13	14	15	16	17	18	19	20	Pts	Pos	21
1	(4) Rune Holta (CZE)	14	2							3				3				3				3	14	1	
2	(9) Wiesław Jaguś (TOR)	11			0		3						3					2		3			11	2	3
3	(3) Tomasz Bajerski (TOR)	11	3						3				1				1				3		11	3	2
4	(1) Jacek Krzyżaniak (BYD)	10	1				1				2				3				3				10	4	
5	(10) Piotr Protasiewicz (TOR)	9			2			1						1			3		2				9	5	
6	(13) Dariusz Fijałkowski (BYD)	8				1	2							0		3					2		8	6	
7	(8) Tomasz Chrzanowski (GDA)	7		3						1			2			1			0				7	7	
8	(16) Robert Sawina (GRU)	7				0				2	1						2			2			7	8	
9	(7) Sebastian Ułamek (CZE)	7		2					0					2	2					1			7	9	
10	(15) Tomasz Jędrzejak (OST)	7				2			1			2						1	1				7	10	
11	(14) Mirosław Kowalik (BYD)	6				3		2					0		1							0	6	11	
12	(11) Andy Smith (BYD)	6			1				2		0					2						1	6	12	
13	(5) Michał Robacki (BYD)	5		F/X			0					3					0					2	5	13	
14	(6) Rafał Kurmański (ZIE)	4		M				0			3							0			1		4	14	
15	(12) Krzysztof Kasprzak (LES)	3			3					E1		X			F/X						-		3	15	
16	(2) Rafał Dobrucki (LES)	3	0					3				F/-				-				-			3	16	
R1	(R1) G. Czechowski (BYD)	1										1								0			1	R1	
R2	(R2) Marcin Jędrzejewski (BYD)	0														0					0		0	R2	
Placing	Rider	Total	1	2	3	4	5	6	7	8	9	10	11	12	13	14	15	16	17	18	19	20	Pts	Pos	21

m - exclusion for exceeding two minute time allowance • t - exclusion for touching the tapes • x - other exclusion • e - retired or mechanical failure • f - fell • ns - non-starter • nc - non-classify

gate A - inside	gate B	gate C	gate D - outside

== Sources ==
- Roman Lach - Polish Speedway Almanac
