= 2003 Mieczysław Połukard Criterium of Polish Speedway Leagues Aces =

Polish speedway event

2003 Criterium of Aces

Seasons
- ← 2002 2004 →

The 22nd Mieczysław Połukard Criterium of Polish Speedway League Aces was the 2003 version of the Mieczysław Połukard Criterium of Polish Speedway Leagues Aces. It took place on March 28 in the Polonia Stadium in Bydgoszcz, Poland.

== Starting positions draw ==
1. Jacek Gollob - Plusssz-Polonia Bydgoszcz
2. Tomasz Bajerski - Apator-Adriana Toruń
3. Mirosław Kowalik - Plusssz-Polonia Bydgoszcz
4. Piotr Świst - ZKŻ Quick-Mix Zielona Góra
5. Tomasz Gollob - Plusssz-Polonia Bydgoszcz
6. Wiesław Jaguś - Apator-Adriana Toruń
7. Robert Sawina - Apator-Adriana Toruń
8. Michał Robacki - Plusssz-Polonia Bydgoszcz
9. Rafał Okoniewski - ZKŻ Quick-Mix Zielona Góra
10. Rune Holta - Top Secret-Włókniarz Częstochowa
11. Jacek Krzyżaniak - Plusssz-Polonia Bydgoszcz
12. Krzysztof Kasprzak - Unia Leszno
13. Rafał Dobrucki - Unia Leszno
14. Tomasz Jędrzejak - Atlas Wrocław
15. Rafał Kurmański - ZKŻ Quick-Mix Zielona Góra
16. Krzysztof Cegielski - Atlas Wrocław
17. (R1) Grzegorz Czechowski - Plusssz-Polonia Bydgoszcz
18. (R2) Łukasz Stanisławski - Plusssz-Polonia Bydgoszcz

== Heat details ==
Placing	Rider	Total	1	2	3	4	5	6	7	8	9	10	11	12	13	14	15	16	17	18	19	20	Pts	Pos
1	(5) Tomasz Gollob (BYD)	15		3			3					3					3					3	15	1
2	(6) Wiesław Jaguś (TOR)	11		1				3			2							2			3		11	2
3	(1) Jacek Gollob (BYD)	10	3				2				0				2				3				10	3
4	(13) Rafał Dobrucki (LES)	9				1	0							3		3					2		9	4
5	(9) Rafał Okoniewski (ZIE)	9			1		1						3					3		1			9	5
6	(11) Jacek Krzyżaniak (BYD)	9			2				0		3					2						2	9	6
7	(16) Krzysztof Cegielski (WRO)	9				2				1	1						2			3			9	7
8	(7) Robert Sawina (TOR)	8		2					1					2	3					0			8	8
9	(14) Tomasz Jędrzejak (WRO)	8				3		2					2		1							0	8	9
10	(10) Rune Holta (CZE)	7			3			1						F/X			1		2				7	10
11	(3) Mirosław Kowalik (BYD)	5	2						3				F/X				-				-		5	11
12	(4) Piotr Świst (ZIE)	5	0							3				1				X				1	5	12
13	(15) Rafał Kurmański (ZIE)	5				0			2			2						1	M				5	13
14	(2) Tomasz Bajerski (TOR)	4	1					E4				1				0				2			4	14
15	(8) Michał Robacki (BYD)	3		0						0			1			1			1				3	15
16	(12) Krzysztof Kasprzak (LES)	2			0					2		0			E4						E4		2	16
R1	(R1) G. Czechowski (BYD)	1																			1		1	R1
R2	(R2) Łukasz Stanisławski (BYD)	0															X						0	R2
Placing	Rider	Total	1	2	3	4	5	6	7	8	9	10	11	12	13	14	15	16	17	18	19	20	Pts	Pos

m - exclusion for exceeding two minute time allowance • t - exclusion for touching the tapes • x - other exclusion • e - retired or mechanical failure • f - fell • ns - non-starter • nc - non-classify

gate A - inside	gate B	gate C	gate D - outside

== Sources ==
- Roman Lach - Polish Speedway Almanac
