= 1998 Mieczysław Połukard Criterium of Polish Speedway Leagues Aces =

Polish speedway event

1998 Criterium of Aces

Seasons
- ← 1997 1999 →

The 17th Mieczysław Połukard Criterium of Polish Speedway League Aces was the 1998 version of the Mieczysław Połukard Criterium of Polish Speedway Leagues Aces. It took place on March 29 in the Polonia Stadium in Bydgoszcz, Poland.

== Starting positions draw ==
1. Tomasz Bajerski - Pergo Gorzów Wlkp.
2. Jacek Gollob - Jutrzenka-Polonia Bydgoszcz
3. Mirosław Kowalik - Apator-DGG Toruń
4. Roman Jankowski - Unia Leszno
5. Robert Sawina - Trilux-Start Gniezno
6. Sebastian Ułamek - Włókniarz-Malma Częstochowa
7. Grzegorz Walasek - ZKŻ Polmos Zielona Góra
8. Tomasz Gollob - Jutrzenka-Polonia Bydgoszcz
9. Robert Dados - Kunterszyn-GKM Grudziądz
10. Rafał Dobrucki - Polonia Piła
11. Dariusz Śledź - Atlas Wrocław
12. Jacek Gomólski - Jutrzenka-Polonia Bydgoszcz
13. Piotr Świst - Van Pur Rzeszów
14. Piotr Protasiewicz - Jutrzenka-Polonia Bydgoszcz
15. Sławomir Drabik - Włókniarz-Malma Częstochowa
16. Jacek Krzyżaniak - Apator-DGG Toruń
17. (R1) Tomasz Poprawski - Jutrzenka-Polonia Bydgoszcz
18. (R2) Dariusz Patynek - Jutrzenka-Polonia Bydgoszcz

== Heat details ==
Placing	Rider	Total	1	2	3	4	5	6	7	8	9	10	11	12	13	14	15	16	17	18	19	20	Pts	Pos
1	(8) Tomasz Gollob (BYD)	14		2						3			3			3			3				14	1
2	(14) Piotr Protasiewicz (BYD)	13				3		2					2		3							3	13	2
3	(5) Robert Sawina (GNI)	12		3			3					2					2					2	12	3
4	(2) Jacek Gollob (BYD)	11	E1					3				3				2				3			11	4
5	(6) Sebastian Ułamek (CZE)	10		1				0			3							3			3		10	5
6	(15) Sławomir Drabik (CZE)	10				2			3			1						2	2				10	6
7	(10) Rafał Dobrucki (PIŁ)	8			3			1						3			0		1				8	7
8	(1) Tomasz Bajerski (GOR)	6	3				1				2				E4				E4				6	8
9	(12) Jacek Gomólski (BYD)	6			1					2		0			1						2		6	9
10	(3) Mirosław Kowalik (TOR)	6	2						2				1				1				F3		6	10
11	(13) Piotr Świst (RZE)	6				1	2							1		1					1		6	11
12	(7) Grzegorz Walasek (CZE)	5		0					1					0	2					2			5	12
13	(4) Roman Jankowski (LES)	5	1							1				2				0				1	5	13
14	(16) Jacek Krzyżaniak (TOR)	3				0				0							3			0			3	14
15	(11) Dariusz Śledź (WRO)	3			2				0		1					0						0	3	15
16	(9) Robert Dados (GRU)	2			0		0						E3					1		1			2	16
R1	(R1) Tomasz Poprawski (BYD)	0																					0	R1
R1	(R1) Dariusz Patynek (BYD)	0																					0	R1
Placing	Rider	Total	1	2	3	4	5	6	7	8	9	10	11	12	13	14	15	16	17	18	19	20	Pts	Pos

m - exclusion for exceeding two minute time allowance • t - exclusion for touching the tapes • x - other exclusion • e - retired or mechanical failure • f - fell • ns - non-starter • nc - non-classify

gate A - inside	gate B	gate C	gate D - outside

== Sources ==
- Roman Lach - Polish Speedway Almanac
