= 2006 Mieczysław Połukard Criterium of Polish Speedway Leagues Aces =

Polish speedway event

2006 Criterium of Aces

Seasons
- ← 2005 2007 →

The 25th Mieczysław Połukard Criterium of Polish Speedway League Aces was the 2006 version of the Mieczysław Połukard Criterium of Polish Speedway Leagues Aces. It took place on April 2 in the Polonia Stadium in Bydgoszcz, Poland.

== Starting positions draw ==
1. Robert Kościecha - Budlex-Polonia Bydgoszcz
2. Roman Chromik - RKM Rybnik
3. Krzysztof Kasprzak - Unia Leszno
4. Wiesław Jaguś - Adriana Toruń
5. Piotr Protasiewicz - Budlex-Polonia Bydgoszcz
6. Krzysztof Buczkowski - Budlex-Polonia Bydgoszcz
7. Piotr Świst - TŻ Lublin
8. Robert Klecha - Budlex-Polonia Bydgoszcz
9. Sebastian Ułamek - Złomrex-Włókniarz Częstochowa
10. Roman Povazhny - RKM Rybnik
11. Maciej Kuciapa - Marma Polskie Folie Rzeszów
12. Karol Ząbik - Adriana Toruń
13. Sławomir Drabik - Złomrex-Włókniarz Częstochowa
14. Robert Sawina - Budlex-Polonia Bydgoszcz
15. Adrian Miedziński - Adriana Toruń
16. Tomasz Gapiński - Atlas Wrocław
17. Marcin Jędrzejewski - Budlex-Polonia Bydgoszcz

== Heat details ==
Placing	Rider	Total	1	2	3	4	5	6	7	8	9	10	11	12	13	14	15	16	17	18	19	20	Pts	Pos	21
1	(9) Sebastian Ułamek (CZE)	14			3		2						3					3		3			14	1	
2	(1) Robert Kościecha (BYD)	12	3				3				1				2				3				12	2	
3	(6) Krzysztof Buczkowski (BYD)	11		2				1			3							2			3		11	3	3
4	(14) Robert Sawina (BYD)	11				2		3					2		1							3	11	4	2
5	(5) Piotr Protasiewicz (BYD)	10		3			E					3					3					1	10	5	
6	(3) Krzysztof Kasprzak (LES)	9	2						3				0				2				2		9	6	
7	(4) Wiesław Jaguś (TOR)	9	1							3				2				1				2	9	7	
8	(15) Adrian Miedziński (TOR)	8				3			2			1						0	2				8	8	
9	(13) Sławomir Drabik (CZE)	7				0	1							3		2					1		7	9	
10	(16) Tomasz Gapiński (WRO)	7				1				2	2						0			2			7	10	
11	(10) Roman Povazhny (RYB)	6			2			2						T/-			1		1				6	11	
12	(12) Karol Ząbik (TOR)	5			0					0		2			3						E		5	12	
13	(17) Marcin Jędrzejewski (BYD)	4												1		3						0	4	13	
14	(2) Roman Chromik (RYB)	2	0					E4				0				1				1			2	14	
15	(7) Piotr Świst (LUB)	2		1					1					0						0			2	15	
16	(8) Robert Klecha (BYD)	2		E2						1			1			E4			E4				2	16	
17	(11) Maciej Kuciapa (RZE)	1			1				0		F/N					-						-	1	17	
Placing	Rider	Total	1	2	3	4	5	6	7	8	9	10	11	12	13	14	15	16	17	18	19	20	Pts	Pos	21

m - exclusion for exceeding two minute time allowance • t - exclusion for touching the tapes • x - other exclusion • e - retired or mechanical failure • f - fell • ns - non-starter • nc - non-classify

gate A - inside	gate B	gate C	gate D - outside

== Sources ==
- Roman Lach - Polish Speedway Almanac
