= 2002 Mieczysław Połukard Criterium of Polish Speedway Leagues Aces =

Polish speedway event

2002 Criterium of Aces

Seasons
- ← 2001 2003 →

The 21st Mieczysław Połukard Criterium of Polish Speedway League Aces was the 2002 version of the Mieczysław Połukard Criterium of Polish Speedway Leagues Aces. It took place on March 26 in the Polonia Stadium in Bydgoszcz, Poland.

== Starting positions draw ==
1. Piotr Protasiewicz - Point'S-Polonia Bydgoszcz
2. Rafał Kurmański - ZKŻ Quick-Mix Zielona Góra
3. Mirosław Kowalik - Apator-Adriana Toruń
4. Grzegorz Walasek - Włókniarz-Candela Częstochowa
5. Tomasz Gollob - Point'S-Polonia Bydgoszcz
6. Robert Sawina - Apator-Adriana Toruń
7. Krzysztof Cegielski - Wybrzeże Gdańsk
8. Piotr Świst - Stal-Pergo Gorzów Wlkp.
9. Andrzej Huszcza - ZKŻ Quick-Mix Zielona Góra
10. Michał Robacki - Point'S-Polonia Bydgoszcz
11. Tomasz Bajerski - Apator-Adriana Toruń
12. Jacek Gollob - Point'S-Polonia Bydgoszcz
13. Łukasz Stanisławski - Point'S-Polonia Bydgoszcz
14. Sławomir Drabik - TŻ-Noban Opole
15. Rafał Dobrucki - BGŻ S.A.-Polonia Piła
16. Wiesław Jaguś - Apator-Adriana Toruń
17. (R1) Robert Umiński - Point'S-Polonia Bydgoszcz
18. (R2) Grzegorz Musiał - Point'S-Polonia Bydgoszcz

== Heat details ==
| Placing | Rider | Total | 1 | 2 | 3 | 4 | 5 | 6 | 7 | 8 | 9 | 10 | 11 | 12 | 13 | 14 | 15 | 16 | 17 | 18 | 19 | 20 | Pts | Pos |
|---|---|---|---|---|---|---|---|---|---|---|---|---|---|---|---|---|---|---|---|---|---|---|---|---|
| 1 | (5) Tomasz Gollob (BYD) | 15 | | 3 | | | 3 | | | | | 3 | | | | | 3 | | | | | 3 | 15 | 1 |
| 2 | (1) Piotr Protasiewicz (BYD) | 13 | 3 | | | | 2 | | | | 2 | | | | 3 | | | | 3 | | | | 13 | 2 |
| 3 | (4) Grzegorz Walasek (CZE) | 11 | 2 | | | | | | | 3 | | | | 3 | | | | 2 | | | | 1 | 11 | 3 |
| 4 | (12) Jacek Gollob (BYD) | 10 | | | 2 | | | | | 1 | | 2 | | | 2 | | | | | | 3 | | 10 | 4 |
| 5 | (15) Rafał Dobrucki (PIŁ) | 9 | | | | 3 | | | 2 | | | 1 | | | | | | 1 | 2 | | | | 9 | 5 |
| 6 | (10) Michał Robacki (BYD) | 8 | | | 3 | | | 2 | | | | | | 2 | | | 1 | | 0 | | | | 8 | 6 |
| 7 | (11) Tomasz Bajerski (TOR) | 8 | | | 1 | | | | 3 | | 1 | | | | | 1 | | | | | | 2 | 8 | 7 |
| 8 | (9) Andrzej Huszcza (ZIE) | 7 | | | T/- | | 0 | | | | | | 2 | | | | | 3 | | 2 | | | 7 | 8 |
| 9 | (8) Piotr Świst (GOR) | 7 | | 2 | | | | | | 0 | | | 1 | | | 3 | | | 1 | | | | 7 | 9 |
| 10 | (16) Wiesław Jaguś (TOR) | 7 | | | | 2 | | | | 2 | 0 | | | | | | 2 | | | 1 | | | 7 | 10 |
| 11 | (6) Robert Sawina (TOR) | 6 | | 1 | | | | 1 | | | 3 | | | | | | | 0 | | | 1 | | 6 | 11 |
| 12 | (3) Mirosław Kowalik (TOR) | 5 | Est | | | | | | 0 | | | | 3 | | | | 0 | | | | 2 | | 5 | 12 |
| 13 | (14) Sławomir Drabik (OPO) | 4 | | | | M/- | | 3 | | | | | 0 | | 1 | | | | | | | 0 | 4 | 13 |
| 14 | (7) Krzysztof Cegielski (GDA) | 4 | | E3 | | | | | 1 | | | | | E2 | E4 | | | | | 3 | | | 4 | 14 |
| 15 | (2) Rafał Kurmański (ZIE) | 3 | 1 | | | | | 0 | | | | 0 | | | | 2 | | | | 0 | | | 3 | 15 |
| 16 | (13) Łukasz Stanisławski (BYD) | 2 | | | | 1 | 1 | | | | | | | E3 | | 0 | | | | | 0 | | 2 | 16 |
| R1 | (R1) Robert Umiński (BYD) | 0 | | | 0 | | | | | | | | | | | | | | | | | | 0 | R1 |
| R2 | (R2) Grzegorz Musiał (BYD) | 0 | | | | 0 | | | | | | | | | | | | | | | | | 0 | R2 |
| Placing | Rider | Total | 1 | 2 | 3 | 4 | 5 | 6 | 7 | 8 | 9 | 10 | 11 | 12 | 13 | 14 | 15 | 16 | 17 | 18 | 19 | 20 | Pts | Pos |

m - exclusion for exceeding two minute time allowance • t - exclusion for touching the tapes • x - other exclusion • e - retired or mechanical failure • f - fell • ns - non-starter • nc - non-classify

| gate A - inside | gate B | gate C | gate D - outside |

== Sources ==
- Roman Lach - Polish Speedway Almanac
