= 1997 Mieczysław Połukard Criterium of Polish Speedway Leagues Aces =

Polish speedway event

1997 Criterium of Aces

Seasons
- ← 1996 1998 →

The 16th Mieczysław Połukard Criterium of Polish Speedway League Aces was the 1997 version of the Mieczysław Połukard Criterium of Polish Speedway Leagues Aces. It took place on March 23 in the Polonia Stadium in Bydgoszcz, Poland.

== Starting positions draw ==
1. Roman Jankowski - Unia Leszno
2. Robert Dados - BB-GKM Grudziądz
3. Jacek Gollob - Jutrzenka-Polonia Bydgoszcz
4. Robert Sawina - Start Gniezno
5. Tomasz Gollob - Jutrzenka-Polonia Bydgoszcz
6. Jacek Krzyżaniak - Apator-DGG Toruń
7. Rafał Dobrucki - Polonia-Philips Piła
8. Sebastian Ułamek - Włókniarz-Malma Częstochowa
9. Piotr Protasiewicz - Jutrzenka-Polonia Bydgoszcz
10. Dariusz Śledź - Atlas Wrocław
11. Piotr Świst - Pergo Gorzów Wlkp.
12. Andrzej Huszcza - ZKŻ Polmos Zielona Góra
13. Sławomir Drabik - Włókniarz-Malma Częstochowa
14. Tomasz Bajerski - Pergo Gorzów Wlkp.
15. Jacek Gomólski - Jutrzenka-Polonia Bydgoszcz
16. Jarosław Olszewski - Polonia-Philips Piła
17. (R1) Eugeniusz Tudzież - Jutrzenka-Polonia Bydgoszcz

== Heat details ==
Placing	Rider	Total	1	2	3	4	5	6	7	8	9	10	11	12	13	14	15	16	17	18	19	20	Pts	Pos
1	(5) Tomasz Gollob (BYD)	15		3			3					3					3					3	15	1
2	(3) Jacek Gollob (BYD)	13	3						2				3				2				3		13	2
3	(13) Sławomir Drabik (CZE)	12				3	2							3		3					1		12	3
4	(9) Piotr Protasiewicz (BYD)	10			2		0						2					3		3			10	4
5	(10) Dariusz Śledź (WRO)	9			3			3						2			0		1				9	5
6	(1) Roman Jankowski (LES)	9	2				1				1				2				3				9	6
7	(2) Robert Dados (GRU)	9	1					2				2				2				2			9	7
8	(11) Piotr Świst (GOR)	8			1				3		3					0						1	8	8
9	(14) Tomasz Bajerski (GOR)	8				2		1					0		3							2	8	9
10	(6) Jacek Krzyżaniak (TOR)	7		2				0			1							2			2		7	10
11	(8) Sebastian Ułamek (CZE)	7		1						2			1			1			2				7	11
12	(15) Jacek Gomólski (BYD)	5				1			1			1						2	0				5	12
13	(4) Robert Sawina (GNI)	3	0							3				0				0				0	3	13
14	(7) Rafał Dobrucki (PIŁ)	3		0					0					1	1					1			3	14
15	(12) Andrzej Huszcza (ZIE)	1			0					1		0									0		1	15
16	(16) Jarosław Olszewski (PIŁ)	1				0				0	0						1			X2			1	16
R1	(R1) Eugeniusz Tudzież (BYD)	0																		0			0	R1
Placing	Rider	Total	1	2	3	4	5	6	7	8	9	10	11	12	13	14	15	16	17	18	19	20	Pts	Pos

m - exclusion for exceeding two minute time allowance • t - exclusion for touching the tapes • x - other exclusion • e - retired or mechanical failure • f - fell • ns - non-starter • nc - non-classify

gate A - inside	gate B	gate C	gate D - outside

== Sources ==
- Roman Lach - Polish Speedway Almanac
