= 1993 Mieczysław Połukard Criterium of Polish Speedway Leagues Aces =

Polish speedway event

1993 Criterium of Aces

Seasons
- ← 1992 1994 →

The 12th Mieczysław Połukard Criterium of Polish Speedway League Aces was the 1993 version of the Mieczysław Połukard Criterium of Polish Speedway Leagues Aces. It took place on March 21 in the Polonia Stadium in Bydgoszcz, Poland.

== Final standings ==
Pos.	Rider name	Pts.	Details
1	Tomasz Gollob (BYD)	14	(3,3,2,3,3)
2	Andrzej Huszcza (ZIE)	12	(2,3,3,1,3)
3	Robert Sawina (TOR)	10	(3,2,3,0,2)
4	Wojciech Załuski (OPO)	9	(0,1,3,2,3)
5	Eugeniusz Skupień (BYD)	9	(0,3,1,3,2)
6	Jacek Krzyżaniak (TOR)	9	(1,3,3,1,1)
7	Jarosław Olszewski (GDA)	9	(2,0,2,2,3)
8	Jacek Gollob (BYD)	8	(3,0,1,2,2)
9	Piotr Świst (GOR)	7	(1,2,2,1,1)
10	Waldemar Cieślewicz (BYD)	6	(0,1,0,3,2)
11	Roman Jankowski (LES)	6	(3,1,2,0,0)
12	Sławomir Drabik (CZE)	6	(0,2,1,3,E)
13	Tomasz Kornacki (BYD)	5	(2,0,2,1,0)
14	Dariusz Stenka (LUB)	4	(2,1,0,0,1)
15	Jacek Gomólski (GNI)	4	(1,2,0,1,F)
16	Jacek Rempała (TAR)	2	(1,0,0,0,1)

== Sources ==
- Roman Lach - Polish Speedway Almanac
