= Pomeranian-Kuyavian Derby =

Derby Pomorza i Kujaw
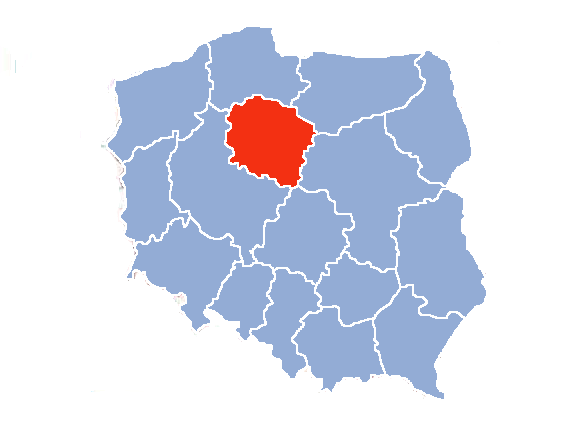
- Kuyavian-Pomeranian Voivodeship in Poland
- Other names: Derby Pomorza
- Location: (Poland) Kuyavian-Pomeranian (Bydgoszcz and Toruń)
- Teams: Polonia Bydgoszcz Vs. KS Toruń
- First meeting: 7 October 1973 (Relegation playoffs); 11 July 1976 (League meeting)

Statistics
- Most wins: KS Toruń (50)

The Pomeranian-Kuyavian Derby (Polish: Derby Pomorza i Kujaw), also known as the Pomeranian Derby (Derby Pomorza) is a motorcycle speedway match between rivals Polonia Bydgoszcz and KS Toruń. The rivalry comes about as Bydgoszcz and Toruń are the two largest cities in former Bydgoszcz Voivodeship (1946–1975), and since 1999 two capitals of Kuyavian-Pomeranian Voivodeship. They are often identified with political and sociological local antagonist.

== Head to Head ==
Team	Win	Draw
Bydgoszcz	36	2
Toruń	50	2

Last update: September 10, 2016

== Riders who ride for both clubs ==
There are incomplete list of riders, who ride in Derby for both clubs:

Riders	for Bydgoszcz	for Toruń
(Poland) Piotr Protasiewicz	1997–2002, 2005-06	2003-04
(Sweden) Tony Rickardsson		
(Sweden) Andreas Jonsson	2004-10	2001
(Poland) Jacek Krzyżaniak		
(Poland) Mirosław Kowalik		
(Poland) Robert Sawina		
(Poland) Tomasz Chrzanowski	2009	
(United Kingdom) Andy Smith		
(United Kingdom) Mark Loram		
(Sweden) Henrik Gustafsson		

== See also ==
- Sports rivalry
- Nationalism and sport
- Kuyavian-Pomeranian Voivodeship (Bydgoszcz-Toruń)
