= 1992 Mieczysław Połukard Criterium of Polish Speedway Leagues Aces =

Polish speedway event

1992 Criterium of Aces

Seasons
- ← 1991 1993 →

The 11th Mieczysław Połukard Criterium of Polish Speedway League Aces was the 1992 version of the Mieczysław Połukard Criterium of Polish Speedway Leagues Aces. It took place on March 22 in the Polonia Stadium in Bydgoszcz, Poland.

== Final standings ==
Pos.	Rider name	Pts.	Details
1	Tomasz Gollob (BYD)	15	(3,3,3,3,3)
2	Jan Krzystyniak (RZE)	14	(2,3,3,3,3)
3	Roman Jankowski (LES)	11	(3,3,3,1,1)
4	Jacek Gomólski (GOR)	10	(2,1,3,2,2)
5	Waldemar Cieślewicz (BYD)	9+3	(0,3,0,3,3)
6	Jacek Woźniak (BYD)	9+2	(3,2,2,2,0)
7	Eugeniusz Skupień (RYB)	8	(1,2,2,1,2)
8	Andrzej Huszcza (ZIE)	8	(1,2,1,3,0)
9	Piotr Świst (GOR)	7	(0,1,2,1,3)
10	Mirosław Kowalik (TOR)	6	(3,2,0,0,1)
11	Jacek Gollob (BYD)	6	(1,0,1,2,2)
12	Jacek Krzyżaniak (TOR)	6	(2,0,1,2,1)
13	Jarosław Olszewski (GDA)	5	(2,1,0,1,1)
14	Zdzisław Rutecki (BYD)	4	(0,0,2,0,2)
15	Piotr Pawlicki, Sr. (LES)	2	(0,1,1,0,F)
16	Zbigniew Lech (WRO)	1	(1,0,0,E,0)

== Sources ==
- Roman Lach - Polish Speedway Almanac
