= 2007 Mieczysław Połukard Criterium of Polish Speedway Leagues Aces =

Polish speedway event

The 26th Mieczysław Połukard Criterium of Polish Speedway League Aces was the 2007 version of the Mieczysław Połukard Criterium of Polish Speedway Leagues Aces. It took place on April 1 in the Polonia Stadium in Bydgoszcz, Poland.

== Starting positions draw ==
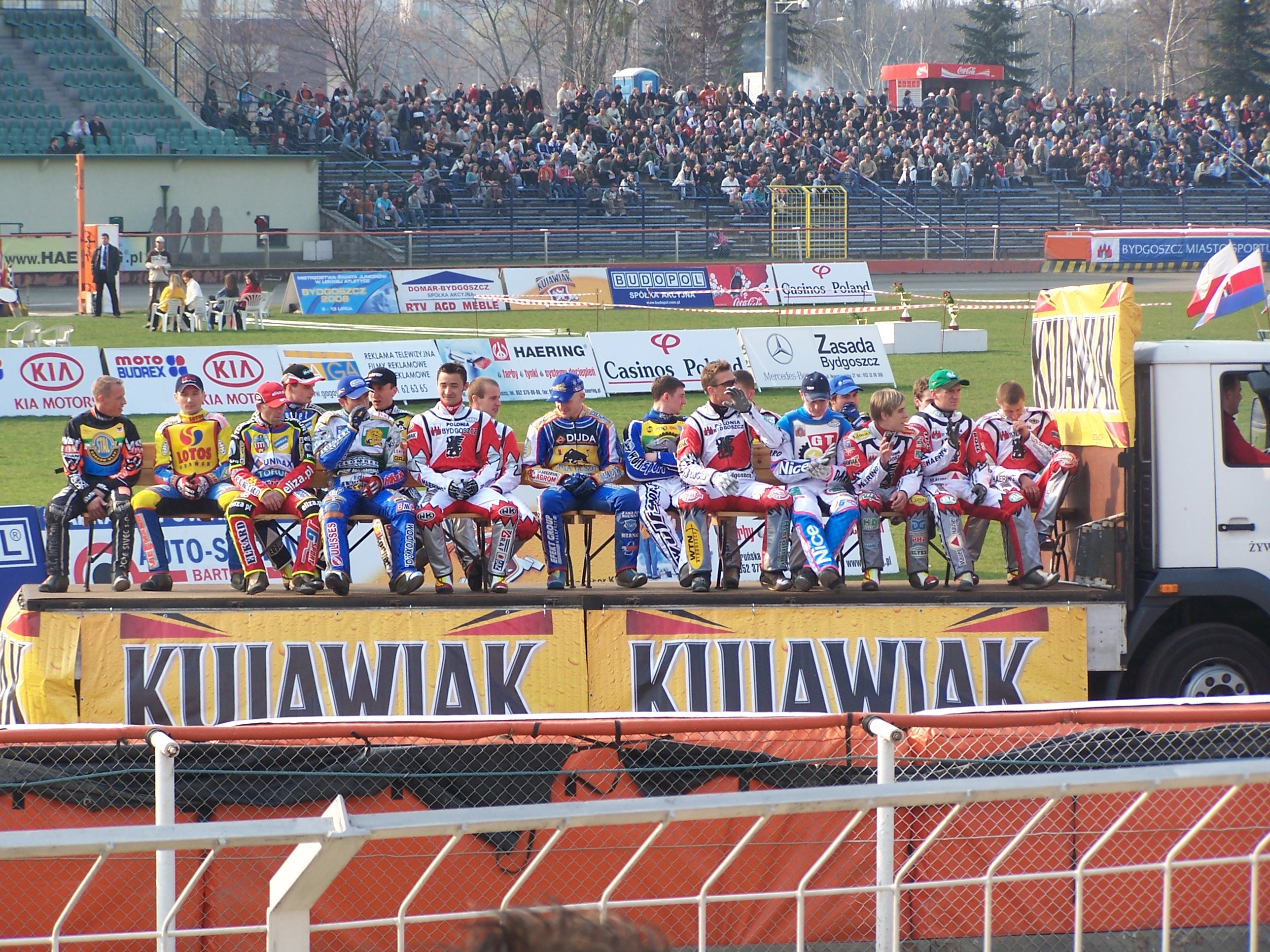
Riders

1. **Krzysztof Buczkowski - Polonia Bydgoszcz**
2. **Michał Szczepaniak - Polonia Bydgoszcz**
3. Wiesław Jaguś - Unibax Toruń
4. Sebastian Ułamek - Złomrex-Włókniarz Częstochowa
5. (Sweden) **Andreas Jonsson - Polonia Bydgoszcz**
6. Jacek Krzyżaniak - GTŻ Grudziądz
7. Paweł Hlib - Stal Gorzów Wlkp.
8. Krzysztof Kasprzak - Unia Leszno
9. **Rafał Okoniewski - Polonia Bydgoszcz**
10. (Slovenia) Matej Ferjan - Stal Gorzów Wlkp.
11. Grzegorz Walasek - ZKŻ Kronopol Zielona Góra
12. Krzysztof Jabłoński - Lotos Gdańsk
13. Adrian Gomólski - Start Gniezno
14. **Mariusz Staszewski - Polonia Bydgoszcz**
15. Rafał Szombierski - RKM Rybnik
16. Adrian Miedziński - Unibax Toruń
17. **Marcin Jędrzejewski - Polonia Bydgoszcz**
18. **Krystian Klecha - Polonia Bydgoszcz**

Note: riders in bold type was Polonia' riders.

== Heat details ==
Placing	Rider	Total	1	2	3	4	5	6	7	8	9	10	11	12	13	14	15	16	17	18	19	20	Pts	Pos	21
1	(Slovenia) (10) Matej Ferjan (GOR)	13			2			2						3			3		3				13	1	
2	(3) Wiesław Jaguś (TOR)	11	2						3				2				2				2		11	2	
3	(2) Michał Szczepaniak (BYD)	10	E4					1				3				3				3			10	3	3
4	(14) Mariusz Staszewski (BYD)	10				2		3					3		0							2	10	4	2
5	(16) Adrian Miedziński (TOR)	9				1				3	3						0			2			9	5	
6	(Sweden) (5) Andreas Jonsson (BYD)	9		2			3					2					1					1	9	6	
7	(1) Krzysztof Buczkowski (BYD)	9	1				1				2				3				2				9	7	
8	(4) Sebastian Ułamek (CZE)	8	3							2				0				0				3	8	8	
9	(15) Rafał Szombierski (RYB)	8				3			0			1						3	1				8	9	
10	(6) Jacek Krzyżaniak (GRU)	7		1														3			3		7	10	
11	(8) Krzysztof Kasprzak (LES)	6		3						1			1			1			0				6	11	
12	(12) Krzysztof Jabłoński (GDA)	5			3					0		0			1						1		5	12	
13	(11) Grzegorz Walasek (ZIE)	5			0				2		1					2						0	5	13	
14	(9) Rafał Okoniewski (BYD)	5			1		2						0					1		1			5	14	
15	(7) Paweł Hlib (GOR)	4		0					T/-					2	2					0			4	15	
16	(17) Marcin Jędrzejewski (BYD)	1							1														1	16	
17	(13) Adrian Gomólski (GNI)	1				0	0							1		0					0		1	17	
-	(18) Krystian Klecha (BYD)	0																					0	-	
Placing	Rider	Total	1	2	3	4	5	6	7	8	9	10	11	12	13	14	15	16	17	18	19	20	Pts	Pos	21

m - exclusion for exceeding two minute time allowance • t - exclusion for touching the tapes • x - other exclusion • e - retired or mechanical failure • f - fell • ns - non-starter • nc - non-classify

gate A - inside	gate B	gate C	gate D - outside

== Sources ==
- Roman Lach - Polish Speedway Almanac
