= 2001 Mieczysław Połukard Criterium of Polish Speedway Leagues Aces =

Polish speedway event

2001 Criterium of Aces

Seasons
- ← 2000 2002 →

The 20th Mieczysław Połukard Criterium of Polish Speedway League Aces was the 2001 version of the Mieczysław Połukard Criterium of Polish Speedway Leagues Aces. It took place on March 31 in the Polonia Stadium in Bydgoszcz, Poland.

== Starting positions draw ==
1. Tomasz Gollob - Bractwo-Polonia Bydgoszcz
2. Robert Sawina - Atlas Wrocław
3. Robert Dados - Atlas Wrocław
4. Sebastian Ułamek - Atlas Wrocław
5. Piotr Protasiewicz - Bractwo-Polonia Bydgoszcz
6. Mirosław Kowalik - Apator-Adriana Toruń
7. Roman Jankowski - Unia Leszno
8. Grzegorz Walasek - Radson-Malma-Włókniarz Częstochowa
9. Rafał Okoniewski - Pergo Gorzów Wlkp.
10. Sławomir Drabik - BGŻ S.A.-Polonia Piła
11. Jacek Gollob - BGŻ S.A.-Polonia Piła
12. Wiesław Jaguś - Apator-Adriana Toruń
13. Krzysztof Cegielski - Wybrzeże Gdańsk
14. Przemysław Tajchert - Bractwo-Polonia Bydgoszcz
15. Andrzej Huszcza - ZKŻ Polmos Zielona Góra
16. Michał Robacki - Bractwo-Polonia Bydgoszcz
17. (R1) Łukasz Stanisławski - Bractwo-Polonia Bydgoszcz
18. (R2) Grzegorz Musiał - Bractwo-Polonia Bydgoszcz

== Heat details ==
Placing	Rider	Total	1	2	3	4	5	6	7	8	9	10	11	12	13	14	15	16	17	18	19	20	Pts	Pos
1	(1) Tomasz Gollob (BYD)	15	3				3				3				3				3				15	1
2	(5) Piotr Protasiewicz (BYD)	14		3			2					3					3					3	14	2
3	(13) Krzysztof Cegielski (GDA)	13				3	1							3		3					3		13	3
4	(2) Robert Sawina (WRO)	10	1					2				2				2				3			10	4
5	(6) Mirosław Kowalik (TOR)	8		2				3			2							1			0		8	5
6	(15) Andrzej Huszcza (ZIE)	8				2			1			1						3	1				8	6
7	(4) Sebastian Ułamek (WRO)	8	2							0				2				2				2	8	7
8	(11) Jacek Gollob (PIŁ)	7			3				3		1					0						0	7	8
9	(8) Grzegorz Walasek (CZE)	7		0						2			2			1			2				7	9
10	(16) Michał Robacki (BYD)	6				E3				3	0						2			1			6	10
11	(14) Przemysław Tajchert (BYD)	5				0		F4					3		1							1	5	11
12	(12) Wiesław Jaguś (TOR)	6			1					1		E2			2						2		6	12
13	(7) Roman Jankowski (LES)	4		1					2					1	0					0			4	13
14	(10) Sławomir Drabik (PIŁ)	4			2			1						0			1		0				4	14
15	(9) Rafał Okoniewski (GOR)	3			0		0						1					0		2			3	15
16	(3) Robert Dados (WRO)	1	E4						F/N				E4				0				1		1	16
R1	(R1) Łukasz Stanisławski (BYD)	0																					0	R1
R2	(R2) Grzegorz Musiał (BYD)	0																					0	R2
Placing	Rider	Total	1	2	3	4	5	6	7	8	9	10	11	12	13	14	15	16	17	18	19	20	Pts	Pos

m - exclusion for exceeding two minute time allowance • t - exclusion for touching the tapes • x - other exclusion • e - retired or mechanical failure • f - fell • ns - non-starter • nc - non-classify

gate A - inside	gate B	gate C	gate D - outside

== Sources ==
- Roman Lach - Polish Speedway Almanac
