= 1995 Mieczysław Połukard Criterium of Polish Speedway Leagues Aces =

Polish speedway event

1995 Criterium of Aces

Seasons
- ← 1994 1996 →

The 14th Mieczysław Połukard Criterium of Polish Speedway League Aces was the 1995 version of the Mieczysław Połukard Criterium of Polish Speedway Leagues Aces. It took place on March 26 in the Polonia Stadium in Bydgoszcz, Poland.

== Starting positions draw ==
1. Jarosław Olszewski - Wybrzeże-Rafineria Gdańsk
2. Adam Pawliczek - RKM Rybnik
3. Jan Krzystyniak - Polonia Piła
4. Dariusz Śledź - Sparta-Polsat Wrocław
5. Tomasz Gollob - Polonia-Jutrzenka Bydgoszcz
6. Marek Kępa - Motor Lublin
7. Piotr Świst - Stal-Michael Gorzów Wlkp.
8. Ireneusz Kwieciński - Polonia-Jutrzenka Bydgoszcz
9. Andrzej Rzepka - Polonia Piła
10. Jacek Krzyżaniak - Apator-Elektrim Toruń
11. Roman Jankowski - Unia Leszno
12. Jacek Gomólski - Polonia-Jutrzenka Bydgoszcz
13. Andrzej Huszcza - ZKŻ Polmos-Beram Zielona Góra
14. (Czech Republic) Václav Milík, Sr. - Wanda Kraków
15. Jacek Gollob - Polonia-Jutrzenka Bydgoszcz
16. Jacek Rempała - Unia Tarnów
17. (R1) Tomasz Poprawski - Polonia-Jutrzenka Bydgoszcz

== Heat details ==
Placing	Rider	Total	1	2	3	4	5	6	7	8	9	10	11	12	13	14	15	16	17	18	19	20	Pts	Pos
1	(5) Tomasz Gollob (BYD)	15		3			3					3					3					3	15	1
2	(Czech Republic) (14) Václav Milík, Sr. (KRA)	12				3		2					3		3							1	12	2
3	(12) Jacek Gomólski (BYD)	11			2					3		1			2						3		11	3
4	(1) Jarosław Olszewski (GDA)	10	2				2				3				0				3				10	4
5	(15) Jacek Gollob (BYD)	9				2			3			2						2	E3				9	5
6	(11) Roman Jankowski (LES)	10			3				1		2					2						2	10	6
7	(10) Jacek Krzyżaniak (TOR)	9			1			3						2			1		2				9	7
8	(4) Dariusz Śledź (WRO)	7	3							0				3				1				X	7	8
9	(8) Ireneusz Kwieciński (BYD)	7		1						2			2			1			1				7	9
10	(13) Andrzej Huszcza (ZIE)	6				1	1							1		3					0		6	10
11	(7) Piotr Świst (GOR)	6		2					2					0	1					1			6	11
12	(3) Jan Krzystyniak (PIŁ)	6	1						0				1				2				2		6	12
13	(2) Adam Pawliczek (RYB)	4	0					1				0				0				3			4	13
14	(6) Marek Kępa (LUB)	4		E3				0			1							2			1		4	14
15	(9) Andrzej Rzepka (PIŁ)	2			0		0						0					0		2			2	15
16	(16) Jacek Rempała (TAR)	1				T/-				1	0						0			0			1	16
R1	(R1) Tomasz Poprawski (BYD)	0				0																	0	R1
Placing	Rider	Total	1	2	3	4	5	6	7	8	9	10	11	12	13	14	15	16	17	18	19	20	Pts	Pos

m - exclusion for exceeding two minute time allowance • t - exclusion for touching the tapes • x - other exclusion • e - retired or mechanical failure • f - fell • ns - non-starter • nc - non-classify

gate A - inside	gate B	gate C	gate D - outside

== Sources ==
- Roman Lach - Polish Speedway Almanac
