= 1994 Mieczysław Połukard Criterium of Polish Speedway Leagues Aces =

Polish speedway event

1994 Criterium of Aces

Seasons
- ← 1993 1995 →

The 13th Mieczysław Połukard Criterium of Polish Speedway League Aces was the 1994 version of the Mieczysław Połukard Criterium of Polish Speedway Leagues Aces. It took place on March 27 in the Polonia Stadium in Bydgoszcz, Poland.

== Starting positions draw ==
1. (Poland) Jacek Krzyżaniak - Apator-Elektrim Toruń
2. (Poland) Jacek Rempała - Unia Tarnów
3. (Denmark) Tommy Knudsen - Sparta-Polsat Wrocław
4. (United Kingdom) Chris Louis - None
5. (Poland) Tomasz Gollob - Polonia-Jutrzenka Bydgoszcz
6. (Poland) Andrzej Huszcza - Morawski Zielona Góra
7. (Poland) Dariusz Stenka - Motor Lublin
8. (Poland) Jarosław Olszewski - Wybrzeże-Rafineria Gdańsk
9. (Poland) Jacek Gomólski - Start Gniezno
10. (Poland) Piotr Świst - Stal-Runat Gorzów Wlkp.
11. (Czech Republic) Roman Matousek - Polonia-Jutrzenka Bydgoszcz
12. (Poland) Roman Jankowski - Unia Leszno
13. (United Kingdom) Andy Smith - Polonia-Jutrzenka Bydgoszcz
14. (United Kingdom) Joe Screen - Włókniarz Częstochowa
15. (Poland) Adam Pawliczek - RKM Rybnik
16. (Poland) Jacek Gollob - Polonia-Jutrzenka Bydgoszcz

== Heat details ==
Placing	Rider	Total	1	2	3	4	5	6	7	8	9	10	11	12	13	14	15	16	17	18	19	20	Pts	Pos
1	(Poland) (5) Tomasz Gollob (BYD)	15		3			3					3					3					3	15	1
2	(Poland) (16) Jacek Gollob (BYD)	14				3				3	3						2			3			14	2
3	(United Kingdom) (14) Joe Screen (CZE)	13				2		3					3		3							2	13	3
4	(United Kingdom) (13) Andy Smith (BYD)	10				1	2							3		1					3		10	4
5	(Poland) (1) Jacek Krzyżaniak (TOR)	9	3				0				2				1				3				9	5
6	(Poland) (8) J. Olszewski (GDA)	9		2						2			2			2			1				9	6
7	(Denmark) (3) Tommy Knudsen (WRO)	8	2						3				0				1				2		8	7
8	(Poland) (10) Piotr Świst (GOR)	8			3			1						2			0		2				8	8
9	(Poland) (6) Andrzej Huszcza (ZIE)	8		1				2			1							3			1		8	9
10	(Poland) (9) Jacek Gomólski (GNI)	7			2		1						1					1		2			7	10
11	(Poland) (2) Jacek Rempała (TAR)	4	1					0				0				3				0			4	11
12	(Poland) (12) Roman Jankowski (LES)	4			Est					0		2			2						0		4	12
13	(United Kingdom) (4) Chris Louis	4	0							1				0				2				1	4	13
14	(Czech Republic) (11) R. Matousek (BYD)	3			1				2		0					0						0	3	14
15	(Poland) (7) Dariusz Stenka (LUB)	3		0					1					1	0					1			3	15
16	(Poland) (15) Adam Pawliczek (RYB)	1				0			0			1						0	E4				1	16
Placing	Rider	Total	1	2	3	4	5	6	7	8	9	10	11	12	13	14	15	16	17	18	19	20	Pts	Pos

m - exclusion for exceeding two minute time allowance • t - exclusion for touching the tapes • x - other exclusion • e - retired or mechanical failure • f - fell • ns - non-starter • nc - non-classify

gate A - inside	gate B	gate C	gate D - outside

== Sources ==
- Roman Lach - Polish Speedway Almanac
