= 1990 Polish speedway season =

Motorcycle racing competition

The 1990 Polish Speedway season was the 1990 season of motorcycle speedway in Poland.

== Individual ==
=== Polish Individual Speedway Championship ===
The 1990 Individual Speedway Polish Championship final was held on 15 August at Lublin.

Pos.	Rider	Club	Total	Points
1	Zenon Kasprzak	Leszno	13 +3	(3,3,3,3,1)
2	Mirosław Korbel	Rybnik	13 +2	(2,3,2,3,3)
3	Tomasz Gollob	Bydgoszcz	12	(2,3,2,2,3)
4	Wojciech Załuski	Opole	11	(3,u,3,3,2)
5	Henryk Bem	Rybnik	10	(2,1,3,1,3)
6	Roman Jankowski	Leszno	9	(1,2,3,2,1)
7	Wojciech Żabiałowicz	Toruń	9	(3,2,2,1,1)
8	Adam Pawliczek	Rybnik	7	(0,d,1,3,3)
9	Piotr Pawlicki Sr.	Leszno	7	(1,2,w,2,2)
10	Tomasz Fajfer	Gniezno	6	(0,2,2,0,2)
11	Grzegorz Malinowski	Wrocław	5	(3,0,1,1,d)
12	Włodzimierz Heliński	Gniezno	5	(w,3,1,1,0)
13	Romuald Janusz	Rzeszów	4	(0,1,d,2,1)
14	Mariusz Sielski	Bydgoszcz	3	(2,1,0,0,0)
15	Jacek Gomólski	Gniezno	2	(1,0,1,0,–)
16	Stanisław Pogorzelski	Opole	1	(d,1,d,d,d)
17	Eugeniusz Skupień (res)	Rybnik	3	(1,2)
18	Marek Muszyński (res)	Lublin	0	(0)

=== Golden Helmet ===
The 1990 Golden Golden Helmet (Polish: Turniej o Złoty Kask, ZK) organised by the Polish Motor Union (PZM) was the 1990 event for the league's leading riders. The final was held over six rounds.

Pos.	Rider	Club	Total	Points
1	Mirosław Korbel	Rybnik	68	(11,12,11,10,14,10)
2	Roman Jankowski	Leszno	61	(9,12,12,12,4,12)
3	Jacek Gomólski	Gniezno	49	(12,6,8,4,9,10)
4	Eugeniusz Skupień	Rybnik	48	(11,14,6,8,3,6)
5	Zbigniew Krakowski	Leszno	47	(8,10,10,8,8,3)
6	Sławomir Drabik	Częstochowa	42	(6,2,10,1,13,10)
7	Jacek Rempała	Tarnów	40	(9,1,9,-,12,9)
8	Zenon Kasprzak	Leszno	36	(8,12,-,13,-,3)
9	Jan Krzystyniak	Rzeszów	36	(13,7,0,6,10,-)
10	Jarosław Olszewski	Gdańsk	34	(3,11,3,5,7,5)
11	Henryk Bem	Rybnik	34	(8,7,6,6,4,3)
12	Robert Sawina	Toruń	31	(3,6,8,6,0,8)
13	Ryszard Dołomisiewicz	Bydgoszcz	15	(-,-,-,7,-,8)

=== Junior Championship ===
- winner - Tomasz Gollob

=== Silver Helmet ===
- winner - Tomasz Gollob

=== Bronze Helmet ===
- winner - Robert Kużdżał

== Pairs ==
=== Polish Pairs Speedway Championship ===
The 1990 Polish Pairs Speedway Championship was the 1990 edition of the Polish Pairs Speedway Championship. The final was held on 13 September at Rzeszów.

Pos	Team	Pts	Riders
1	Polonia Bydgoszcz	24	Ryszard Dołomisiewicz 12, Tomasz Gollob 12
2	Stal Rzeszów	17	Jan Krzystyniak 8, Janusz Stachyra 9
3	ROW Rybnik	16	Mirosław Korbel 2, Eugeniusz Skupień 11, Antoni Skupień 3
4	Unia Leszno	13	Roman Jankowski 4, Zenon Kasprzak 6, Piotr Pawlicki Sr. 3
5	Motor Lublin	11	Dariusz Stenka 2, Jerzy Głogowski 3, Dariusz Śledź 6
6	Falubaz Zielona Góra	9	Andrzej Huszcza 4, Jarosław Szymkowiak 5

== Team ==
=== Team Speedway Polish Championship ===
The 1990 Team Speedway Polish Championship was the 1990 edition of the Team Polish Championship.

Apator Toruń won the gold medal. The team included Wojciech Żabiałowicz, Jacek Krzyżaniak, Mirosław Kowalik and Robert Sawina.

=== First League ===
Pos	Club	Pts	W	D	L	+/−
1	Apator Toruń	28	14	0	6	+62
2	ROW Rybnik	22	11	0	9	+162
3	Polonia Bydgoszcz	22	11	0	9	+136
4	Stal Gorzów Wielkopolski	16	8	0	12	–132
5	Motor Lublin	23	11	1	8	+82
6	Unia Leszno	21	10	1	9	–39
7	Falubaz Zielona Góra	14	7	0	13	–123
8	Stal Rzeszów	14	7	0	13	–148

=== Second League ===
Pos	Club	Pts	W	D	L	+/−
1	Unia Tarnów	33	16	1	1	+440
2	Sparta Wrocław	25	12	1	5	+262
3	Kolejarz Opole	24	12	0	6	+203
4	Start Gniezno	24	12	0	6	+151
5	Włókniarz Częstochowa	24	12	0	6	+31
6	Wybrzeże Gdańsk	16	8	0	10	+28
7	KKŻ Krosno	13	6	1	11	–81
8	Śląsk Świętochłowice	10	5	0	13	–130
9	Ostrovia Ostrów	8	4	0	14	–306
10	GKM Grudziądz	3	1	1	16	–598
