= 1996 Mieczysław Połukard Criterium of Polish Speedway Leagues Aces =

Polish speedway event

1996 Criterium of Aces

Seasons
- ← 1995 1997 →

The 15th Mieczysław Połukard Criterium of Polish Speedway League Aces was the 1996 version of the Mieczysław Połukard Criterium of Polish Speedway Leagues Aces. It took place on April 4 in the Polonia Stadium in Bydgoszcz, Poland.

== Starting positions draw ==
1. Tomasz Fajfer - Start Gniezno
2. Mirosław Kowalik - Apator-DGG Toruń
3. Waldemar Cieślewicz - Polonia-Jutrzenka Bydgoszcz
4. Roman Jankowski - Unia Leszno
5. Tomasz Gollob - Polonia-Jutrzenka Bydgoszcz
6. Dariusz Stenka - Wybrzeże-Rafineria Gdańsk
7. Tomasz Bajerski - Apator-DGG Toruń
8. Jarosław Olszewski - Polonia-Philips Piła
9. Jacek Gomólski - Polonia-Jutrzenka Bydgoszcz
10. Sebastian Ułamek - Włókniarz-Malma Częstochowa
11. Rafał Dobrucki - Polonia-Philips Piła
12. Piotr Markuszewski - GKM-Browary Bydgoskie Grudziądz
13. Jacek Rempała - Unia Tarnów
14. Piotr Świst - Stal-Pergo Gorzów Wlkp.
15. Jacek Gollob - Polonia-Jutrzenka Bydgoszcz
16. Sławomir Dudek - ZKŻ Polmos Zielona Góra
17. (R1) Eugeniusz Tudzież - Polonia-Jutrzenka Bydgoszcz
18. (R2) Marcin Ryczek - Polonia-Jutrzenka Bydgoszcz

== Heat details ==
Placing	Rider	Total	1	2	3	4	5	6	7	8	9	10	11	12	13	14	15	16	17	18	19	20	Pts	Pos	21
1	(5) Tomasz Gollob (BYD)	15		3			3					3					3					3	15	1	
2	(14) Piotr Świst (GOR)	12				2		3					2		3							2	12	3	3
3	(10) Sebastian Ułamek (CZE)	12			3			1						3			2		3				12	2	E2
4	(15) Jacek Gollob (BYD)	11				3			2			2						3	1				11	4	
5	(9) Jacek Gomólski (BYD)	11			2		2						3					2		2			11	5	
6	(2) Mirosław Kowalik (TOR)	10	1					2				1				3				3			10	6	
7	(4) Roman Jankowski (LES)	8	3							3				2				0				0	8	7	
8	(11) Rafał Dobrucki (PIŁ)	8			1				3		3					E4						1	8	8	
9	(8) Jarosław Olszewski (PIŁ)	7		1						2			1			1			2				7	9	
10	(3) Waldemar Cieślewicz (BYD)	6	2						0				0				1				3		6	10	
11	(6) Dariusz Stenka (GDA)	5		2				0			1							1			1		5	11	
12	(13) Jacek Rempała (TAR)	5				1	1							1		2					T/-		5	12	
13	(7) Tomasz Bajerski (TOR)	4		0					1					0	2					1			4	13	
14	(1) Tomasz Fajfer (GNI)	3	0				0				2				1				0				3	14	
15	(16) Sławomir Dudek (ZIE)	1				0				1	0						0			0			1	15	
16	(12) Piotr Markuszewski (GRU)	0			0					0		0			0						0		0	16	
R1	(R1) Eugeniusz Tudzież (BYD)	2																			2		2	R1	
R2	(R2) Marcin Ryczek (BYD)	0																					0	R2	
Placing	Rider	Total	1	2	3	4	5	6	7	8	9	10	11	12	13	14	15	16	17	18	19	20	Pts	Pos	21

m - exclusion for exceeding two minute time allowance • t - exclusion for touching the tapes • x - other exclusion • e - retired or mechanical failure • f - fell • ns - non-starter • nc - non-classify

gate A - inside	gate B	gate C	gate D - outside

== Sources ==
- Roman Lach - Polish Speedway Almanac
