= 2000 Mieczysław Połukard Criterium of Polish Speedway Leagues Aces =

Polish speedway event

2000 Criterium of Aces

Seasons
- ← 1999 2001 →

The 19th Mieczysław Połukard Criterium of Polish Speedway League Aces was the 2000 version of the Mieczysław Połukard Criterium of Polish Speedway Leagues Aces. It took place on March 26 in the Polonia Stadium in Bydgoszcz, Poland.

== Starting positions draw ==
1. (Poland) Tomasz Gollob - Polonia Bydgoszcz
2. (Poland) Rafał Dobrucki - Ludwik-Polonia Piła
3. (Czech Republic) Antonín Kasper, Jr. - Start Gniezno
4. (Denmark) Brian Andersen - Atlas Wrocław
5. (Poland) Sebastian Ułamek - Lotos-Wybrzeże Gdańsk
6. (United Kingdom) Joe Screen - Polonia Bydgoszcz
7. (Australia) Shane Parker - Polonia Bydgoszcz
8. (Poland) Wiesław Jaguś - Apator-Netia Toruń
9. (Sweden) Henrik Gustafsson - Polonia Bydgoszcz
10. (Poland) Michał Robacki - Polonia Bydgoszcz
11. (Poland) Jacek Gollob - Ludwik-Polonia Piła
12. (Sweden) Mikael Karlsson - RKM Rybnik
13. (Sweden) Stefan Dannö - TŻ Noban Opole
14. (Poland) Piotr Protasiewicz - Polonia Bydgoszcz
15. (Poland) Robert Sawina - Atlas Wrocław
16. (Denmark) Brian Karger - Ludwik-Polonia Piła
17. (Poland) (R1) Łukasz Stanisławski - Polonia Bydgoszcz
18. (Poland) (R2) Robert Umiński - Polonia Bydgoszcz

== Heat details ==
Placing	Rider	Total	1	2	3	4	5	6	7	8	9	10	11	12	13	14	15	16	17	18	19	20	Pts	Pos	21
1	(Poland) (1) Tomasz Gollob (BYD)	15	3				3				3				3				3				15	1	
2	(Poland) (15) Robert Sawina (WRO)	14				3			3			3						3	2				14	2	
3	(Poland) (14) P. Protasiewicz (BYD)	10				2		1					3		2							2	10	4	3
4	(Poland) (2) Rafał Dobrucki (PIŁ)	10	1					2				2				3				2			10	3	2
5	(Denmark) (16) Brian Karger (PIŁ)	9				1				3	M/-						2			3			9	5	
6	(Sweden) (12) Mikael Karlsson (RYB)	9			3					2		1			1						2		9	6	
7	(Poland) (5) Sebastian Ułamek (GDA)	8		2			0					0					3					3	8	7	
8	(United Kingdom) (6) Joe Screen (BYD)	8		0				3			2							0			3		8	8	
9	(Sweden) (9) Henrik Gustafsson (BYD)	8			2		2						2					2		0			8	9	
10	(Poland) (8) Wiesław Jaguś (TOR)	7		3						0			1			2			1				7	10	
11	(Denmark) (4) Brian Andersen (WRO)	7	2							1				3				1				0	7	11	
12	(Australia) (7) Shane Parker (BYD)	6		1					2					2	0					1			6	12	
13	(Czech Republic) (3) Antonín Kasper, Jr. (GNI)	3	0						1				0				1				1		3	13	
14	(Sweden) (13) Stefan Dannö (OPO)	3				0	1							1		1					0		3	14	
15	(Poland) (11) Jacek Gollob (PIŁ)	2			E4				0		1					0						1	2	15	
16	(Poland) (10) Michał Robacki (BYD)	1			1			0						0			0		0				1	16	
R1	(Poland) (R1) Ł. Stanisławski (BYD)	0									0												0	R1	
R2	(Poland) (R2) Robert Umiński (BYD)	0																					0	R2	
Placing	Rider	Total	1	2	3	4	5	6	7	8	9	10	11	12	13	14	15	16	17	18	19	20	Pts	Pos	21

m - exclusion for exceeding two minute time allowance • t - exclusion for touching the tapes • x - other exclusion • e - retired or mechanical failure • f - fell • ns - non-starter • nc - non-classify

gate A - inside	gate B	gate C	gate D - outside

== Sources ==
- Roman Lach - Polish Speedway Almanac
