= Zbigniew Raniszewski =

Polish speedway rider

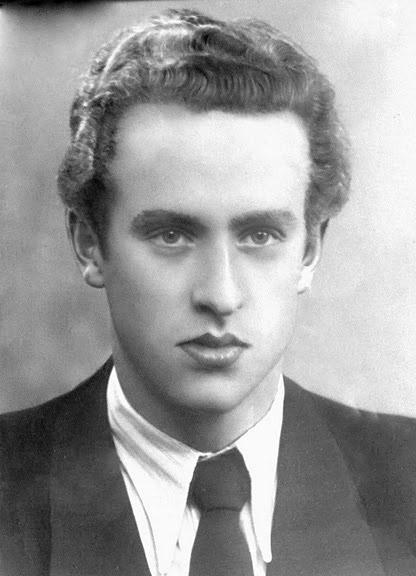
- Born: 22 April 1927; Toruń, Poland
- Died: 21 April 1956 (aged 28); Vienna, Austria
- Nationality: Polish

Career history

Poland
- 1946–1951: TKM Toruń
- 1951–1956: Gwardia Bydgoszcz

Individual honours
- 1951, 1955: Polish Individual Speedway Championship bronze
- 1951, 1953: Criterium of Aces

Team honours
- 1955: Polish league champion

Zbigniew Raniszewski (22 April 1927 – 21 April 1956) was a motorcycle speedway rider from Poland.

== Career ==
Raniszewski started his speedway career with TKM Toruń (Toruński Klub Motocyklowy), the club in the city he was born and bred in. In 1951, he joined Gwardia Bydgoszcz and his first league season was during the 1951 Polish speedway season. It turned out to be his breakthrough season because he won the bronze medal behind Włodzimierz Szwendrowski and Alfred Spyra in the Polish Individual Speedway Championship and also won the silver medal in the Team Speedway Polish Championship.

As a member of the Gwardia Bydgoszcz team, Raniszewski went on to win a silver medal in 1953. He was also twice winner of the Criterium Aces at his home track in 1951 and 1953.

In 1955, Raniszewski won another bronze medal at the Individual Polish Championship and won the Polish league title with Gwardia Bydgoszcz.

On 21 April 1956, Raniszewski was representing Poland against Austria at the Praterstadion in Vienna, when he lost his life in a crash. On the first bend he hit a set of stairs that had not been protected by a safety fence. Before the news of his death reached England, he had been named in the Polish team to tour the United Kingdom in May of 1956.

After Raniszewski's death, the KS Apator Stadium was prefixed with his name as a mark of respect.

== See also ==
Rider deaths in motorcycle speedway
