= 1994 Polish speedway season =

Motorcycle racing competition

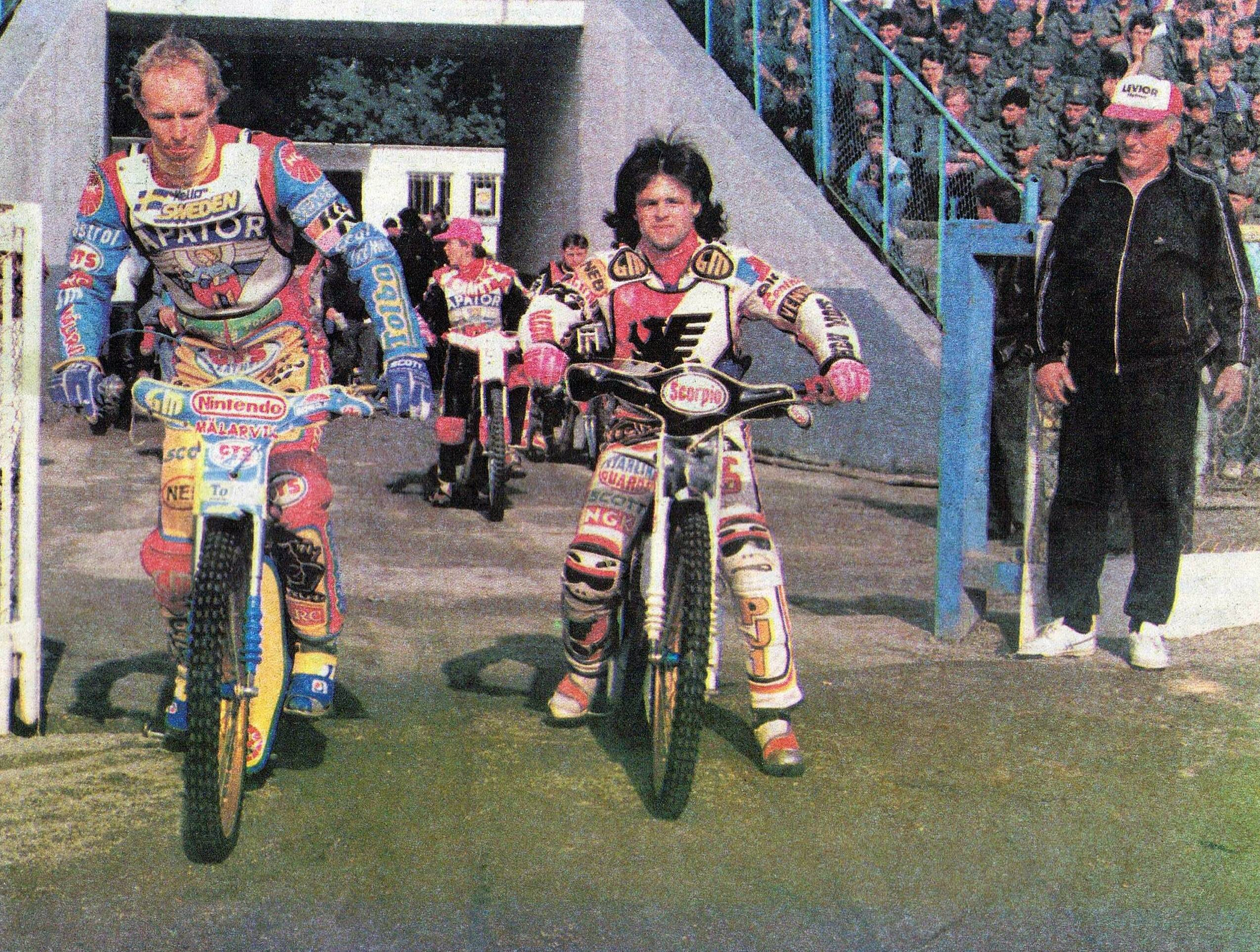
- Per Jonsson (left) topped the league averages riding for Toruń

The 1994 Polish Speedway season was the 1994 season of motorcycle speedway in Poland.

== Individual ==
=== Polish Individual Speedway Championship ===
The 1994 Individual Speedway Polish Championship final was held on 8 October at Wrocław. Tomasz Gollob won the Polish Championship for the third consecutive season.

Pos.	Rider	Club	Total	Points
1	Tomasz Gollob	Bydgoszcz	14	(3,3,2,3,3)
2	Jacek Krzyżaniak	Toruń	13	(2,2,3,3,3)
3	Jarosław Olszewski	Gdańsk	11	(3,2,1,2,3)
4	Dariusz Śledź	Wrocław	10	(3,2,1,3,1)
5	Robert Sawina	Gdańsk	10	(2,3,3,1,1)
6	Sławomir Drabik	Częstochowa	8	(2,2,3,1,0)
7	Wojciech Załuski	Wrocław	7	(3,d,2,2,0)
8	Adam Łabędzki	Leszno	7	(0,3,1,1,2)
9	Rafał Dobrucki	Piła	7	(0,1,1,2,3)
10	Roman Jankowski	Leszno	6	(0,1,3,0,2)
11	Jacek Rempała	Tarnów	6	(1,0,0,3,2)
12	Janusz Stachyra	Częstochowa	6	(1,3,0,t,2)
13	Mirosław Korbel	Rybnik	5	(1,0,2,1,1)
14	Piotr Świst	Gorzów Wlkp	4	(0,1,2,0,1)
15	Adam Fajfer	Gniezno	3	(1,0,0,2,0)
16	Krzysztof Kuczwalski	Toruń	3	(2,1,0,0,0)
17	Jacek Gollob (res)	Bydgoszcz	0	(u)
18	Mirosław Cierniak (res)	Tarnów	ns	

=== Golden Helmet ===
The 1994 Golden Golden Helmet (Polish: Turniej o Złoty Kask, ZK) organised by the Polish Motor Union (PZM) was the 1994 event for the league's leading riders. The final was held at Wrocław on the 4 August. Tomasz Gollob once again dominated by scoring a 15-point maximum and then went on to win the Polish Championship.

Pos.	Rider	Club	Total	Points
1	Tomasz Gollob	Bydgoszcz	15	(3,3,3,3,3)
2	Dariusz Śledź	Wrocław	13 +3	(3,2,3,2,3)
3	Jacek Krzyżaniak	Toruń	13 +2	(2,3,3,3,2)
4	Grzegorz Rempała	Tarnów	9	(2,2,2,2,1)
5	Piotr Świst	Gorzów Wlkp.	8	(3,0,1,1,3)
6	Jacek Rempała	Tarnów	8	(3,3,1,0,1)
7	Roman Jankowski	Leszno	8	(1,2,t,3,2)
8	Piotr Baron	Wrocław	7	(2,2,0,2,1)
9	Mirosław Kowalik	Toruń	7	(1,1,2,0,3)
10	Jarosław Olszewski	Gdańsk	7	(2,1,1,1,2)
11	Jacek Gollob	Bydgoszcz	6	(0,1,2,3,0)
12	Adam Pawliczek	Rybnik	6	(0,w,3,2,1)
13	Tomasz Bajerski	Toruń	4	(1,0,0,1,2)
14	Rafał Dobrucki	Piła	3	(0,3,0,0,0)
15	Jan Krzystyniak	Piła	3	(1,0,1,1,0)
16	Krzysztof Okupski	Piła	0	(0,0,0,0,0)
17	Jacek Gomólski (res)	Gniezno	2	(2)
18	Marek Kępa (res)	Lublin	1	(1)

=== Junior Championship ===
- winner - Grzegorz Rempała

=== Silver Helmet ===
- winner - Piotr Baron

=== Bronze Helmet ===
- winner - Waldemar Walczak

== Pairs ==
=== Polish Pairs Speedway Championship ===
The 1994 Polish Pairs Speedway Championship was the 1994 edition of the Polish Pairs Speedway Championship. The final was held on 31 July at Leszno.

Pos	Team	Pts	Riders
1	Polonia Bydgoszcz	26	Tomasz Gollob 15, Jacek Gollob 11
2	Unia Leszno	24	Roman Jankowski 10, Adam Łabędzki 14
3	Stal Gorzów Wlkp.	19+3	Piotr Świst 13+3, Ryszard Franczyszyn 1, Piotr Paluch 5
4	Sparta Wrocław	19+2	Wojciech Załuski 6, Dariusz Śledź 8, Piotr Baron 5
5	Zielona Góra	15	Andrzej Huszcza 10, Jarosław Szymkowiak 5, Grzegorz Walasek 0
6	Unia Tarnów	13	Jacek Rempała 8, Grzegorz Rempała 3, Mirosław Cierniak 2
7	Włókniarz Częstochowa	10	Sławomir Drabik 1, Janusz Stachyra 7, Dariusz Rachwalik 2

== Team ==
=== Team Speedway Polish Championship ===
The 1994 Team Speedway Polish Championship was the 1994 edition of the Team Polish Championship. WTS Wrocław, led by Tommy Knudsen, won the gold medal for the second consecutive season.

==== First Division ====
Pos	Team	Pts	W	D	L	Diff
1	WTS Wrocław	24	12	0	6	+159
2	Unia Tarnów	21	10	1	7	+16
3	Apator Toruń	20	10	0	8	+89
4	Stal Gorzów Wielkopolski	20	9	2	7	+16
5	Wybrzeże Gdańsk	19	8	3	7	+78
6	Włókniarz Częstochowa	18	9	0	9	+1
7	Motor Lublin	18	9	0	9	–69
8	Polonia Bydgoszcz	16	8	0	10	+54
9	Unia Leszno	16	7	2	9	–48
10	Zielona Góra	8	4	0	14	–296

==== Second Division ====
Pos	Team	Pts	W	D	L	Diff
1	Polonia Piła	28	14	0	4	+298
2	Stal Rzeszów	28	14	0	4	+172
3	RKM Rybnik	27	13	1	4	+261
4	Start Gniezno	25	12	1	5	+145
5	GKM Grudziądz	18	9	0	9	+0
6	KKŻ Krosno	14	7	0	11	–156
7	Ostrów	12	6	0	12	–10
8	Wanda Kraków	10	5	0	13	–170
9	Śląsk Świętochłowice	10	5	0	13	–250
10	Kolejarz Opole	8	4	0	14	–195
