= 1986–87 Polska Liga Hokejowa season =

Polish ice hockey season

The 1986–87 Polska Liga Hokejowa season was the 52nd season of the Polska Liga Hokejowa, the top level of ice hockey in Poland. 10 teams participated in the league, and Podhale Nowy Targ won the championship.

== First round ==
	Club	GP	W	T	L	Goals	Pts
1.	Zagłębie Sosnowiec	18	14	1	3	100:52	29
2.	Podhale Nowy Targ	18	12	4	2	96:43	28
3.	Polonia Bytom	18	14	0	4	95:45	28
4.	Naprzód Janów	18	13	0	5	95:64	26
5.	GKS Tychy	18	8	2	8	79:68	18
6.	KS Cracovia	18	6	6	6	61:68	18
7.	ŁKS Łódź	18	5	2	11	68:105	12
8.	Stoczniowiec Gdansk	18	4	1	13	47:92	9
9.	GKS Katowice	18	2	2	14	59:104	6
10.	Polonia Bydgoszcz	18	1	4	13	41:100	6

== Final round ==
	Club	GP	W	T	L	Goals	Pts
1.	Podhale Nowy Targ	28	19	6	3	135:71	44
2.	Naprzód Janów	28	20	2	6	143:89	42
3.	Polonia Bytom	28	19	1	8	132:75	39
4.	Zagłębie Sosnowiec	28	16	1	11	123:91	33
5.	GKS Tychy	28	10	5	13	106:107	25
6.	KS Cracovia	28	8	8	12	95:115	24

== Qualification round ==
	Club	GP	W	T	L	Goals	Pts
7.	ŁKS Łódź	30	11	4	15	120:152	26
8.	Stoczniowiec Gdansk	30	10	3	17	92:133	23
9.	GKS Katowice	30	7	4	19	112:154	18
10.	Polonia Bydgoszcz	30	4	6	20	81:152	14

== Playoffs ==
=== Quarterfinals ===
- Podhale Nowy Targ - Stoczniowiec Gdansk 2:0 (11:2, 9:3)
- Zagłębie Sosnowiec - GKS Tychy 2:1 (3:6, 2:1, 8:5)
- Naprzód Janów - ŁKS Łódź 2:0 (6:3, 8:4)
- Polonia Bytom - KS Cracovia 2:0 (12:1, 6:3)

=== Semifinals ===
- Podhale Nowy Targ - Zagłębie Sosnowiec 2:1 (3:5, 3:2, 5:4 SO)
- Naprzód Janów - Polonia Bytom 0:2 (1:3, 5:6)

=== Final ===
- Podhale Nowy Targ - Polonia Bytom 2:1 (1:2, 4:3, 5:4)

== Placing round ==
=== 7th place ===
- ŁKS Łódź - Stoczniowiec Gdansk 2:0 (8:6, 6:4)

=== 5th place ===
- GKS Tychy - KS Cracovia 1:2 (3:4, 8:6, 1:5)

=== 3rd place ===
- Naprzód Janów - Zagłębie Sosnowiec 2:1 (4:6, 11:3, 4:2)

== Relegation ==
- GKS Katowice - Polonia Bydgoszcz 2:0 (4:3, 4:2)
