= Václav Milík =

Václav Milík may refer to:

- Václav Milík Sr. (born 1960), Czech speedway rider
- Václav Milík Jr. (born 1993), Czech speedway rider
