= Václav Milík Sr. =

Czech motorcycle speedway rider

- Born: 23 February 1960 (age 66); Czechoslovakia
- Nationality: Czech

Career history
- 1991–1992: Wrocław
- 1993–1994: Piła
- 1996: Łódź
- 1999, 2001: Opole

Individual honours
- 1991: Czech Republic Individual Champion

Václav Milík Sr. (born 23 February 1960) is a Czech former speedway rider who was started in the 1997 Speedway World Team Cup for the Czech Republic team.

Milík also rode on ice and took part in the British Open Ice Championships at Telford in 1990.

Milík reached the semi-final of the 1993 Individual Speedway World Championship.

== Family ==
Milík's son Václav Jr. is also a speedway rider.

== Results ==
=== World Championships ===
- Team World Championship Speedway World Team Cup
  - 1997 – (Poland) Piła – 5th placed (0 pts)

=== European Championships ===
- European Club Champions' Cup
  - 2000 – (Poland) Piła – 4th placed (3 pts)

=== Domestic competitions ===
- Team Polish Championship (League)
  - 1991 – Second League for Wrocław (Average 2.452)
  - 1992 – Second League for Wrocław B (Average 2.636)
  - 1992 – First League for Wrocław (Average 1.941)
  - 1993 – Second League for Piła (Average 2.098)
  - 1994 – Second League for Piła (Average 1.000)
  - 1996 – Second League for Łódź (Average 1.471)
  - 1999 – Second League for Opole (Average 2.286)
  - 2001 – First League for Opole (Average 0.500)

=== Other competitions ===
- Mieczysław Połukard Criterium of Polish Speedway Leagues Aces in (Poland) Bydgoszcz
  - 1995 – Runner-up (12 pts)

== See also ==
- Czechoslovakia national speedway team
- Czech Republic national speedway team
