= Michał Szczepaniak =

Polish speedway rider

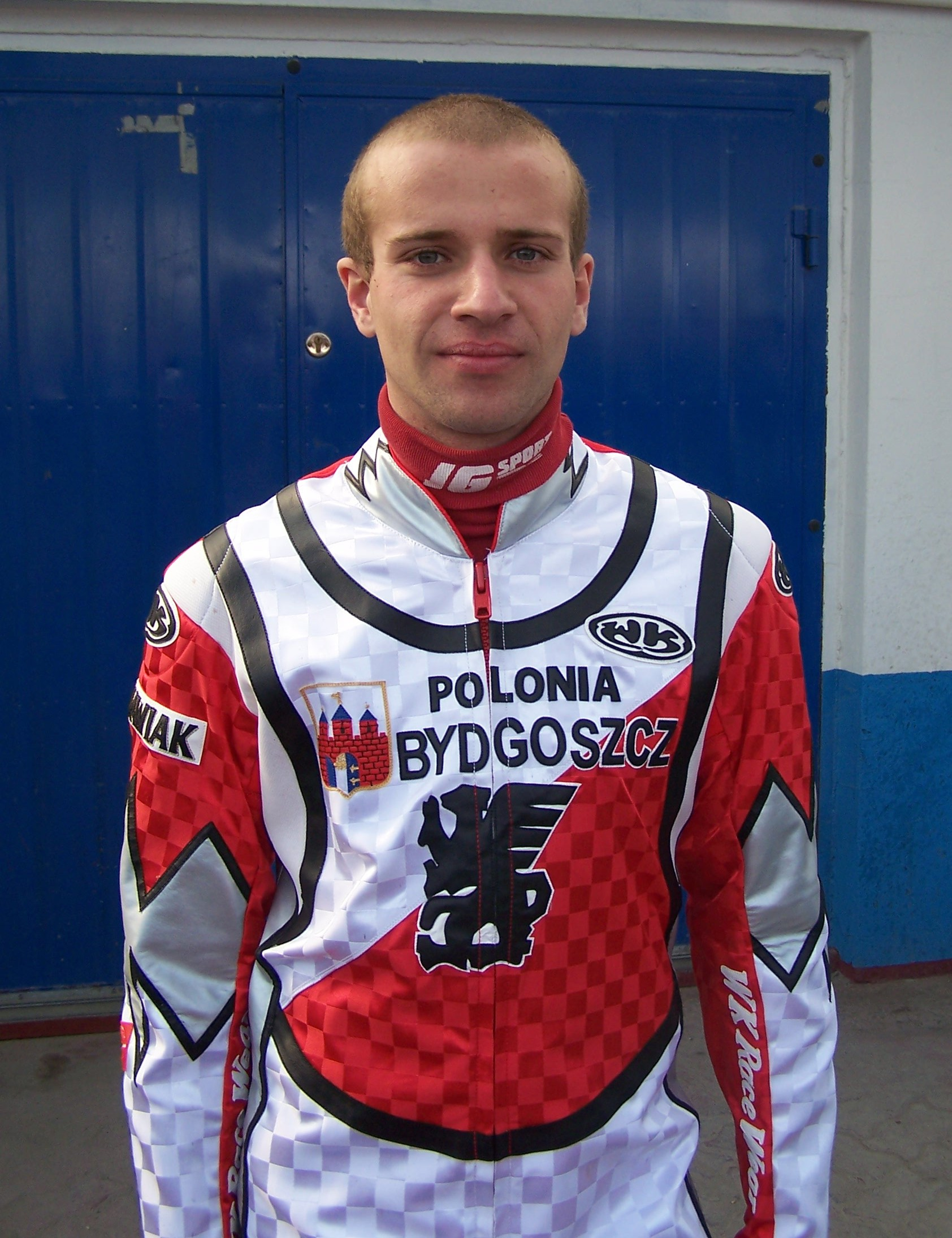
- Born: 1 August 1983 (age 43); Ostrów Wielkopolski, Poland
- Nationality: Polish

Career history

Poland
- 1999–2001, 2005–2006, 2013, 2015: Ostrów
- 2002–2003, 2016–2017: Piła
- 2004, 2008–2009: Częstochowa
- 2007: Bydgoszcz
- 2010–2011: Gniezno
- 2012: Łódź
- 2014: Rybnik
- 2018: Gdańsk
- 2019: Opole

Great Britain
- 2012–2013: Coventry

Michał Szczepaniak (born 1 August 1983) is a former motorcycle speedway from Poland.

== Career ==
Szczepaniak rode in the Team Speedway Polish Championship for multiple clubs from 1999 to 2019; they were Ostrów, Polonia Piła, Włókniarz Częstochowa, Polonia Bydgoszcz, Start Gniezno, Łódź, Rybnik, Wybrzeże Gdańsk and Kolejarz Opole. He reached the final of the 2005 Individual Speedway European Championship.

Szczepaniak also rode in the top tier of British Speedway riding for the Coventry Bees during the 2013 Elite League speedway season.

== Family ==
Szczepaniak's younger brother Mateusz is also a speedway rider.
