= Robert Kościecha =

Polish speedway rider

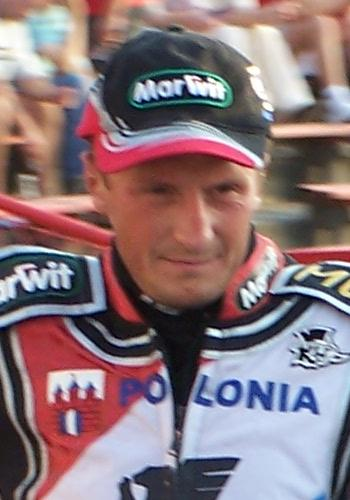
- Born: 22 November 1977 (age 48); Toruń, Poland
- Nationality: Polish

Career history

Poland
- 1995–2001, 2007–2009: Toruń
- 2002: Piła
- 2003–2005: Gdańsk
- 2006, 2010–2015: Bydgoszcz

Sweden
- 2000–2002, 2006–2010: Piraterna
- 2004–2005: Rospiggarna
- 2011: Hammarby
- 2012: Valsarna

Denmark
- 2003–2004: Kronjylland
- 2005–2007: Brovst
- 2012: Holstebro

Great Britain
- 2005: Poole Pirates

Team honours
- 2005: European Pairs Champion
- 2001: Team Polish Champion

Robert Kościecha (born 22 November 1977 in Toruń, Poland) is a former motorcycle speedway rider from Poland.

== Career ==
Kościecha won 2005 European Pairs Speedway Champion title.

In 2005, Kościecha rode in several fixtures for Poole Pirates.

Kościecha was also captain for his Swedish team Piraterna in 2009.

== Family ==
Kościecha's father Roman (2 August 1949 - 6 June 2009) was also a speedway rider. He has a sister called Agnieszka.

== Results ==
=== World Championships ===
- Individual U-21 World Championship
  - 1998 - 11th place (5 points)

=== European Championships ===
- Individual European Championship
  - 2006 - 13th (4 points)
- European Pairs Championship
  - 2004 - 3rd place (6 points)
  - 2005 - European Champion (12 points)
  - 2007 - 1st place in Semi-Final (3 points)
- European Club Champions' Cup
  - 2009 - (Poland) Toruń - Runner-up (7 pts) Toruń

=== Domestic competitions ===
- Individual Polish Championship
  - 2004 - 4th place
  - 2009 - 17th place in Semi-Final 2
- Team Polish Championship
  - 2001 - Polish Champion

== See also ==
- Poland national speedway team
