= Mariusz Staszewski =

Polish speedway rider (born 1975)

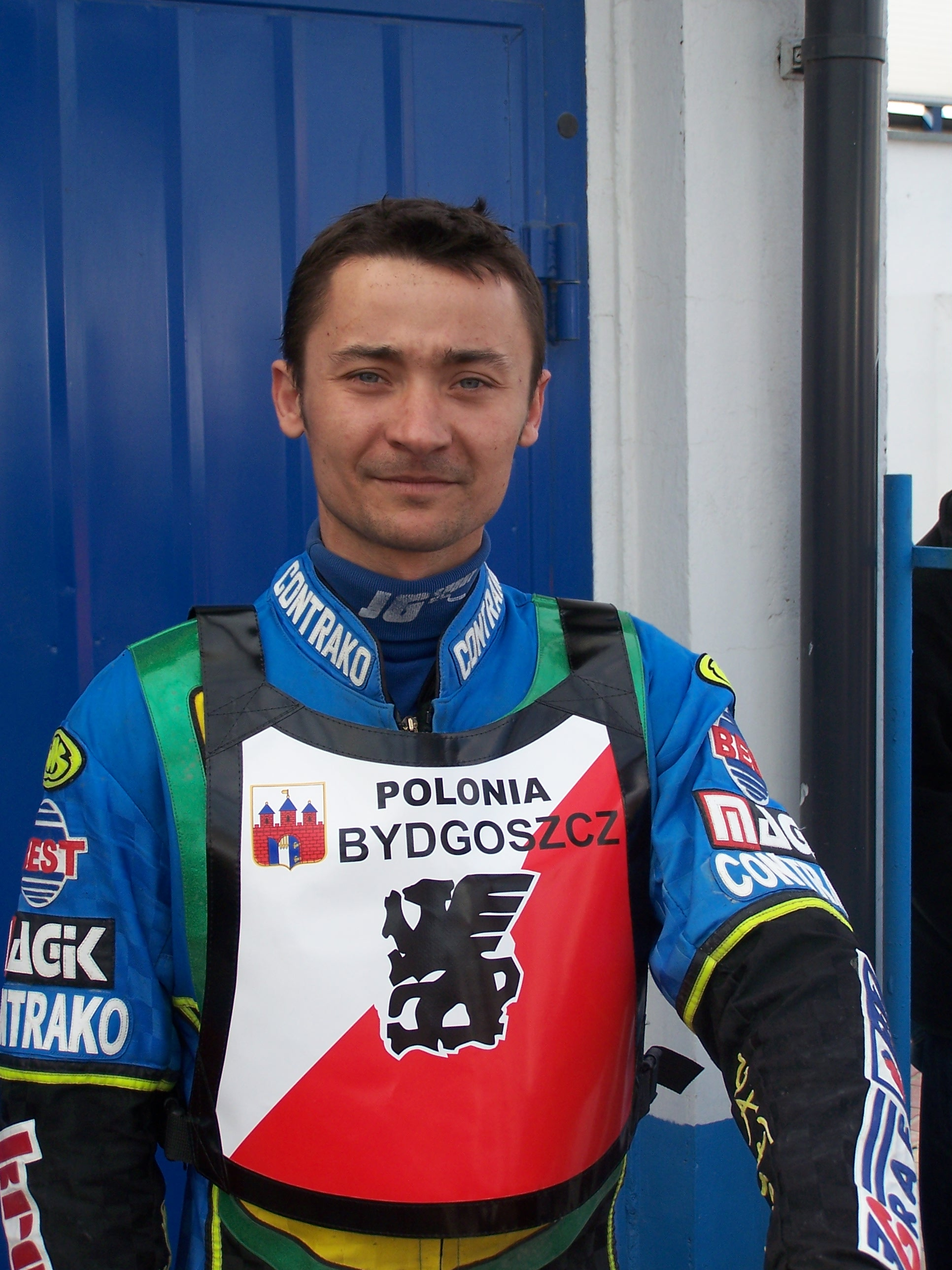
- Born: 25 January 1975 (age 51); Poland
- Nationality: Polish

Career history

Poland
- 1992–1997, 2001–2002: Gorzów
- 1998–2000: Częstochowa
- 2003–2004: Rybnik
- 2005–2006: Zielona Góra
- 2007: Bydgoszcz
- 2009–2013: Ostrów
- 2014: Opole
- 2014: Rawicz

Denmark
- 2000: Odense
- 2001: Herning
- 2006, 2012: Outrup
- 2010: Holsted
- 2014: Fjelsted

Sweden
- 2000: Team Svelux
- 2001: Nässjö
- 2002–2003: Örnarna

Individual honours
- 2001 – second: European Championship

Mariusz Staszewski (born 25 January 1975 in Poland) is a former motorcycle speedway rider from Poland.

== Career ==
Staszewski gained his speedway licence in 1991 and rode for Stal Gorzów Wielkopolski in 1992.

In 2001, Staszewski finished second in the 2001 Individual Speedway European Championship.

From 2009 to 2013, Staszewski rode in the Team Speedway Polish Championship for Ostrów.

== Honours ==
- Individual European Championship:
  - 2001 – silver medal (13 points)
  - 2007 – 10th place (6 points)

== See also ==
- Poland national speedway team
