= Mirosław Kowalik (speedway rider) =

Polish speedway rider (born 1969)

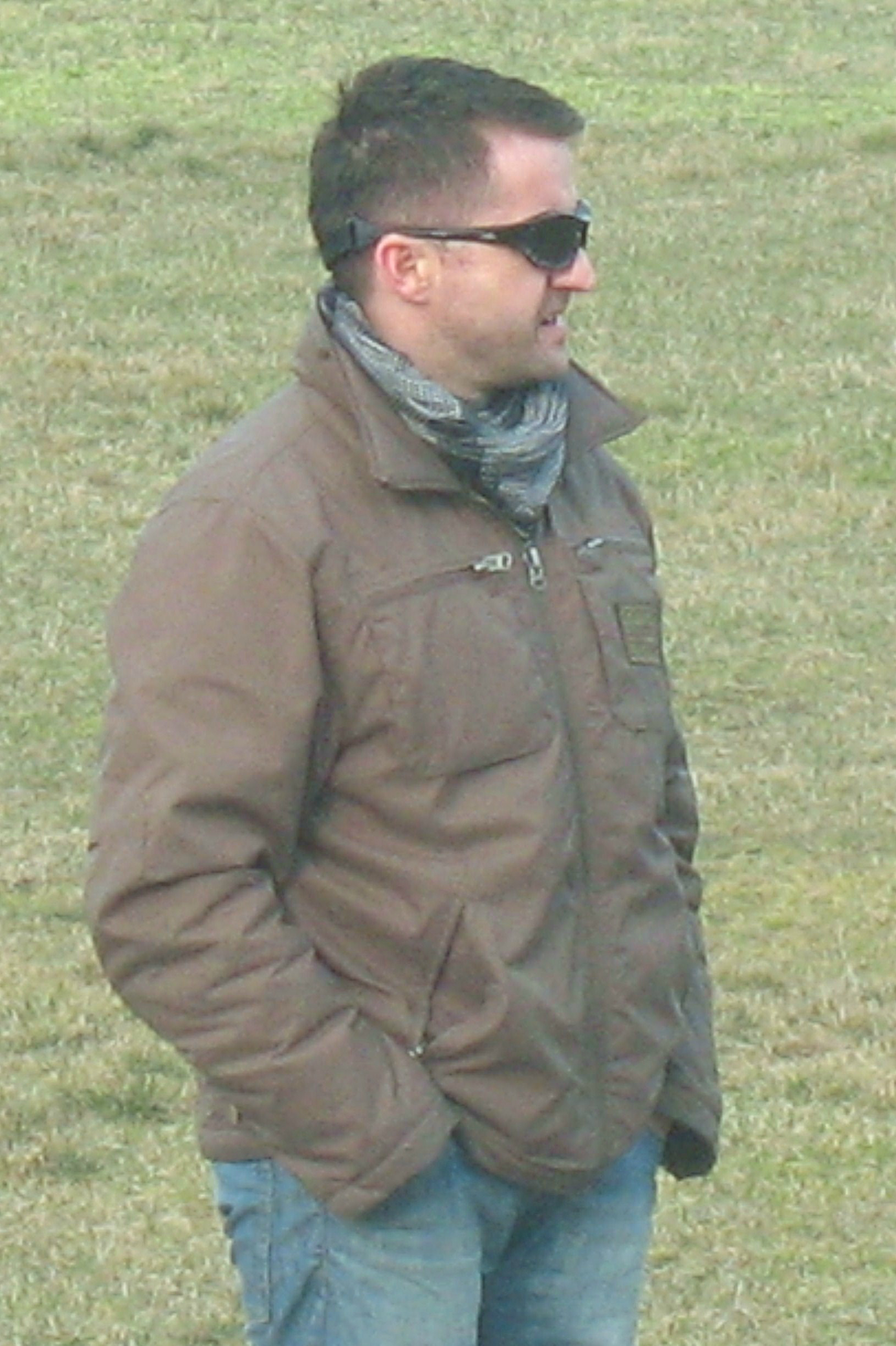
- Born: 7 May 1969 (age 57); Aleksandrów Kujawski, Poland
- Nationality: Polish

Current club information
- Manager: Poland (co-manager)

Career history

Poland
- 1987–2002: Toruń
- 2003–2004: Bydgoszcz

Great Britain
- 1995: Ipswich Witches

Sweden
- 1997–2001: Masarna
- 2002–2003: Indianerna

Team honours
- 1990, 2001: Team Speedway Polish Championship
- 2000: Elitserien Champion
- 1998: Allsvenskan Div 1 Champion

Mirosław Kowalik (born 7 May 1969 in Aleksandrów Kujawski, Poland) is a former motorcycle speedway rider from Poland, He earned eight international caps for the Poland national speedway team.

== Career ==
Kowalik began his career at Toruń during the 1988 Polish speedway season. He would remain loyal with the club for 16 seasons before joining Polonia Bydgoszcz in 2003.

Kowalik rode for Ipswich Witches in the British speedway leagues during the 1993 British League season, riding nine times for a 3.56 average and appeared for Masarna in Sweden between 1997 and 2001.

In 2001, Kowalik was selected by Poland for the 2001 Speedway World Cup Qualifying round 1, when the team easily won the round and went on to win a silver medal in the 2001 Speedway World Cup.

After retiring, Kowalik took up coaching and was the KS Toruń team manager in 2012.

== See also ==
- Poland national speedway team
