= Jacek Krzyżaniak =

Polish speedway rider

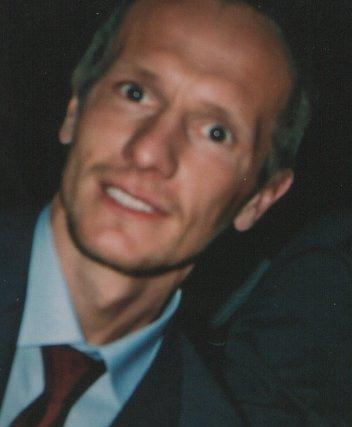
- Born: 18 October 1968 (age 58); Toruń, Poland
- Nationality: Polish

Career history

Poland
- 1988–1998: Apator Toruń
- 1999–2002: WTS Wrocław
- 2003–2005: Polonia Bydgoszcz
- 2006–2008: GTŻ Grudziądz

Sweden
- 1994–1996: Masarna
- 1998–2000: Kaparna

Individual honours
- 1997: Polish Champion
- 1999: Polish Golden Helmet Winner

Team honours
- 1997 and 2001 - Runner-up: Team World Championship
- 1990: Polish League Champion

Jacek Krzyżaniak (born 18 October 1968 in Toruń, Poland) is a former international motorcycle speedway rider from Poland, who was a member of Poland national team.

== Career ==
In a career spanning twenty years from 1988 to 2008, Krzyżaniak rode for Apator Toruń, WTS Wrocław, Polonia Bydgoszcz and GTŻ Grudziądz

Krzyżaniak won silver medals at 1997 Speedway World Team Cup and 2001 Speedway World Cup. He won Individual Polish Champion title in 1997 and Team Polish Champion title in 1990.

== Results ==
=== Speedway Grand Prix ===
1998 SGP
	Grand Prix	Pos.	Pts.	Heats	Draw
1 (1)	(Germany) Pocking	20	3	(2,0,0)	14

permanent speedway rider
wild card, track reserve or qualified reserve
rider not classified (track reserve who did not start)

=== World Championships ===
- Individual World Championship (Speedway Grand Prix)
  - 1998 - 30th place (3 points in German SGP)
- Team World Championship (Speedway World Team Cup and Speedway World Cup)
  - 1992 - 2nd place in Group B (14 points)
  - 1993 - 3rd place in Group A (7 points)
  - 1997 - (Poland) Piła - Runner-up (0 points)
  - 2001 - (Poland) Wrocław - Runner-up (0 points)

=== European Championships ===
- Individual European Championship
  - 2004 - (Denmark) Holsted - 5th place (10 points)

=== Domestic competitions ===
- Individual Speedway Polish Championship
  - 1994 - (Poland) Wrocław - Runner-up
  - 1997 - (Poland) Częstochowa - Polish Champion
  - 1999 - (Poland) Bydgoszcz - Bronze medal
  - 2000 - (Poland) Piła - Bronze medal
  - 2002 - (Poland) Toruń - Bronze medal
- Team Speedway Polish Championship
  - 1990 - Polish Champion
  - 1991 - Bronze medal
  - 1992 - Bronze medal
  - 1993 - Bronze medal
  - 1994 - Bronze medal
  - 1995 - Runner-up
  - 1996 - Runner-up
  - 1999 - Runner-up
  - 2001 - Runner-up
  - 2002 - Bronze medal
  - 2003 - Bronze medal
  - 2005 - Runner-up
- Polish Golden Helmet
  - 1994 - (Poland) Wrocław - Bronze medal
  - 1999 - (Poland) Wrocław - Winner

== See also ==
- Poland national speedway team
- List of Speedway Grand Prix riders
