= Robert Sawina =

Polish speedway rider

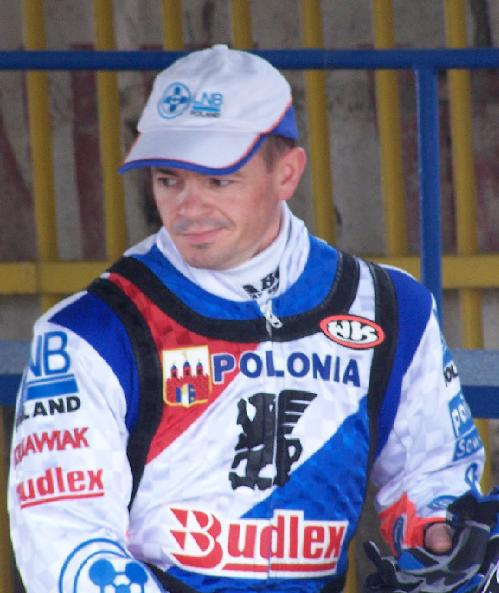
- Sawina in 2006
- Born: 27 May 1971 (age 55); Toruń, Poland
- Nationality: Polish

Career history

Poland
- 1987–1993, 2002–2003: Apator Toruń
- 1994–1995: Wybrzeże Gdańsk
- 1996–1999: Start Gniezno
- 2000–2001: WTS Sparta Wrocław
- 2004: GKM Grudziądz
- 2005–2006: Polonia Bydgoszcz
- 2010: Ostrów Wielkopolski

Sweden
- 2001–2006: Smederna

Denmark
- 2004–2005: Brovst

Individual honours
- 2001: Polish Championship silver
- 1999, 2001: Golden Helmet silver

Team honours
- 1990: Polish League Champion

Robert Sawina (born 27 May 1971) is a former motorcycle speedway rider from Poland.

== Career ==
Sawina represented Poland during the 1992 Speedway World Team Cup. He also reached the 1992 Speedway Under-21 World Championship final.

Sawina won the silver medal at the Polish Individual Speedway Championship in 2001. He twice won the silver medal in the prestigious Golden Helmet during the 1999 and 2001 Polish speedway seasons.

After retiring, Sawina later became the team manager of KS Toruń.

== Major results ==
=== World Cup ===
- 1992 - 8th place
