= Polonia Bydgoszcz =

Polish motorcycle speedway team

ŻKS Polonia Bydgoszcz

Club information
- Track address: Stadion Miejski im. Józefa Piłsudskiego ul. Sportowa 2 Bydgoszcz
- Country: Poland
- Founded: 1920; 106 years ago
- Team manager: Krzysztof Kanclerz
- League: Ekstraliga
- Website: Official website

Club facts
- Colours: White and Red
- Track size: 348 metres (381 yd)
- Track record time: 59.64 seconds
- Track record date: 8 May 2011
- Track record holder: Emil Sayfutdinov

Major team honours
Polish League Champions	1955, 1971, 1992, 1997, 1998, 2000, 2002
Pair Polish Champion	1974, 1990, 1991, 1993, 1994, 1995, 1996, 1997, 1999, 2000, 2002
Individual Polish Champion	1992, 1993, 1994, 1995, 1998, 1999, 2001, 2002
European Club Champions	1998, 1999, 2001

Polonia Bydgoszcz is a Polish sports club based in Bydgoszcz most known for its speedway team ŻKS Polonia Bydgoszcz which currently races in the 1. Liga. The club has won the Polish Speedway League Championship seven times, the latest in 2002, and European Team Championship three times, the latest in 2001. The club also has a football team that plays in the lower leagues, though it was more successful in the past and played in the Polish top division, plus several other departments: athletics, cycling and boccia.

== History ==
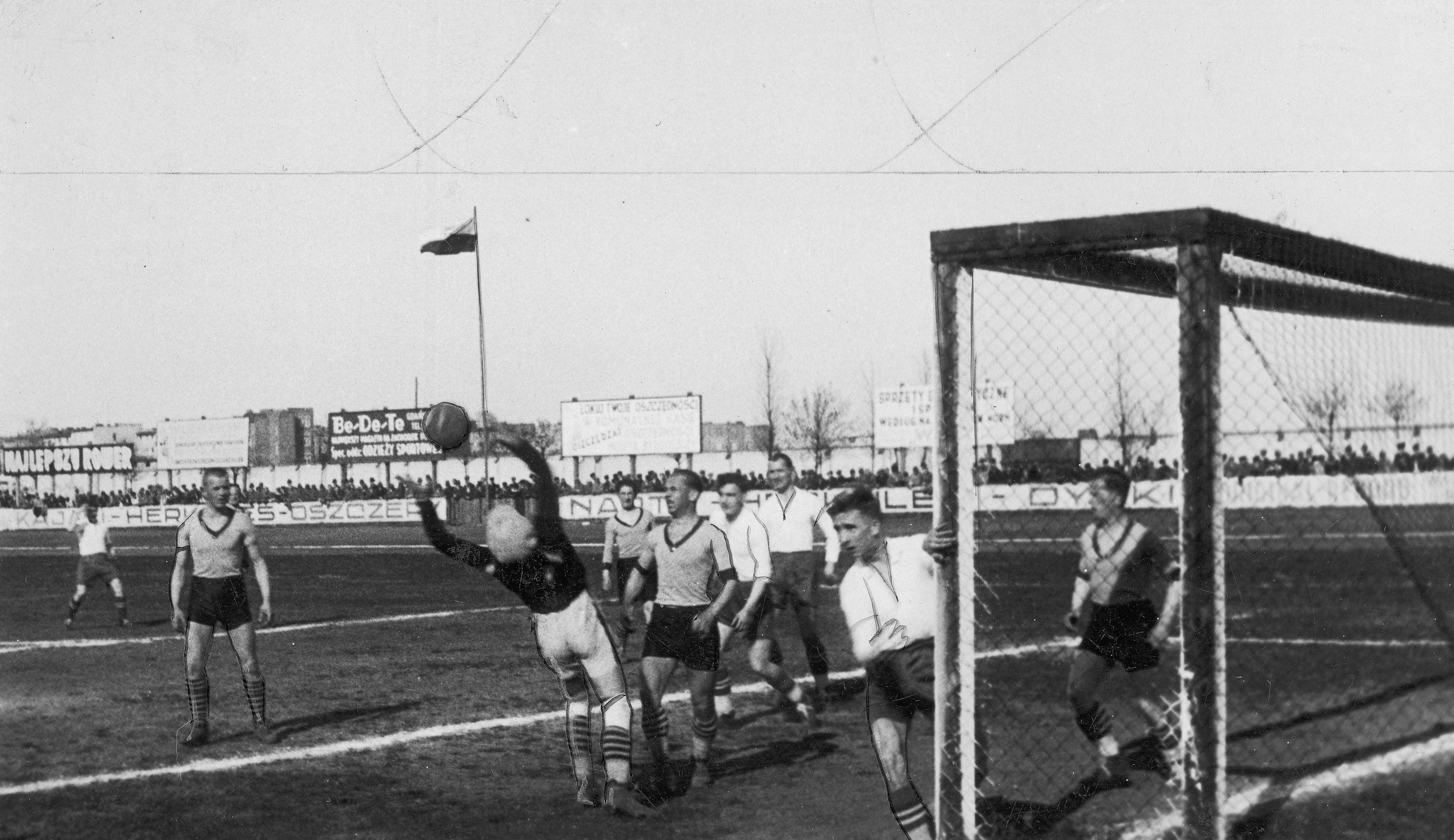
Football match between Polonia Bydgoszcz and Śmigły Wilno in Bydgoszcz in 1935

BKS Polonia Bydgoszcz was founded on 14 May 1920 by Edmund Szyc, a sports enthusiast and an official of Warta Poznań. Szyc, who had come to Bydgoszcz from Poznań in the early spring of 1920, wanted to create a sports organization with a patriotic spirit, based on Polish Army soldiers garrisoned in the city. The colour scheme of Polonia was white-red-green (to commemorate Polish flag, plus green, the traditional colour of Warta Poznań’s jerseys).

In the Second Polish Republic, Polonia Bydgoszcz was one of the largest sports organizations in the nation. It had several departments, such as football, track and field, boxing, ice hockey, cycling, basketball, handball and volleyball. Among the most notable athletes of the time were: Stanisław Zakrzewski (high jumper), Klemens Biniakowski (runner, who participated in the 1928 Summer Olympics), Feliks Więcek (cyclist, winner of the 1928 Tour de Pologne). Polonia’s football team were four times champions of Polish Pomerania, but failed to win promotion to the Ekstraklasa.

After World War II, Polonia was reactivated on 21 October 1945. In 1947, its football team once again won local championships. On 22 May 1946 the speedway department was formed, but in 1949, the so-called First Polonia was dissolved by the Communist authorities, who disliked its prewar, bourgeoisie roots.

In 1949-57, Polonia Bydgoszcz did not exist. On 24 May 1957 BKS Polonia and ZS Gwardia (sports organization supported by Milicja Obywatelska) merged into Milicyjny KS Polonia. The new club took over the traditions of the 1920 organization and quickly emerged as one of the most important sports clubs of the country. Former Gwardia Bydgoszcz was a powerful organization, with a top class football team (promoted to Ekstraklasa in 1953), while its speedway team was the 1955 Polish Champions. Furthermore, several Gwardia’s track and fielders took part in the 1952 Olympic Games in Helsinki. In the early 1950s, Gwardia had as many as 17 departments. Its most famous sports personality of that time was tennis player Jadwiga Jędrzejowska.

The newly established Militia Sports Club Polonia Bydgoszcz took over Gwardia’s hues (red - white - blue), to commemorate the colours of the French Revolution, and to symbolize the new, Communist regime of Poland. In 1962, the name of the club was changed into Bydgoszcz Sports Club (BKS) Polonia, to be changed into Guards Sports Club (GKS) Polonia in 1974. Finally, in 1990, the name Bydgoszcz Sports Club Polonia was returned.

In the late 1980s, GKS Polonia had over 1500 members, including 700 athletes. In 1990, the police authority (former Milicja Obywatelska) withdrew its financial support of the club. As a result, the club was supported by the city government. In 1992, the football team was closed to return in 1994, and the ice hockey department was separated from the organization. In the same year, the speedway team of Polonia won its third Polish Championship.

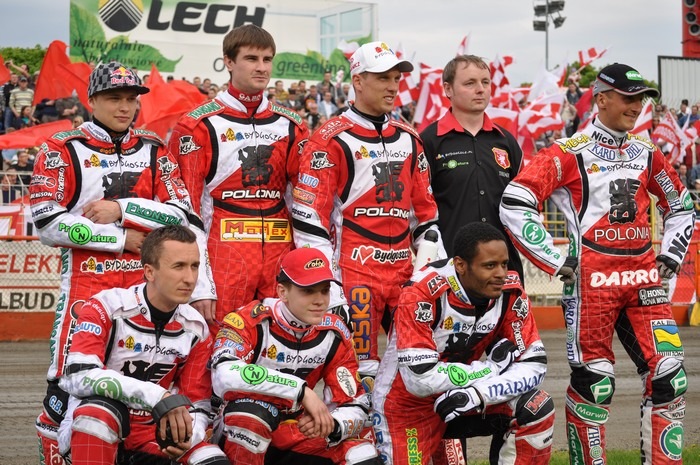
2010 Polonia Bydgoszcz speedway team

By the late 1990s, Polonia had returned to its former glory. Speedway team, with Tomasz Gollob, was four times Polish champion (1997, 1998, 2000, 2002), table tennis team was among the best in the country, and football team won promotion to the third level.

In 2003, local authorities dissolved Polonia Bydgoszcz. The departments of the former organization created their own teams, such as Zuzlowy Klub Sportowy (Speedway Sports Club) Polonia, and the traditions of BKS Polonia are continued by the football team, called Klub Pilkarski (Football Club) Polonia.

=== Names ===
Names of major sposnors were attached to the name of the team.

- 1993-1998: Jutrzenka Polonia Bydgoszcz
- 2001: Bractwo Polonia Bydgoszcz
- 2002: PointS Polonia Bydgoszcz
- 2003: Plusssz Polonia Bydgoszcz
- 2004-2006: Budlex Polonia Bydgoszcz
- 2013: Składywęgla.pl Polonia Bydgoszcz
- 2019: Zooleszcz Polonia Bydgoszcz
- 2020-:Abramczyk Polonia Bydgoszcz

== Management ==
Polonia Bydgoszcz since 27 October 2006 is Joint stock company (pl: spółka akcyjna or S.A.).

- board of directors:
  - President: Leszek Tillinger
- supervisory board:
  - President: Bartosz Rakoczy
  - Members: Bogdan Sawarski and Roman Woźniak
- annual general meeting:
  - 80 % - BTŻ Polonia Bydgoszcz (Voluntary association)
  - 20 % - City Bydgoszcz

== Speedway section ==
=== History ===
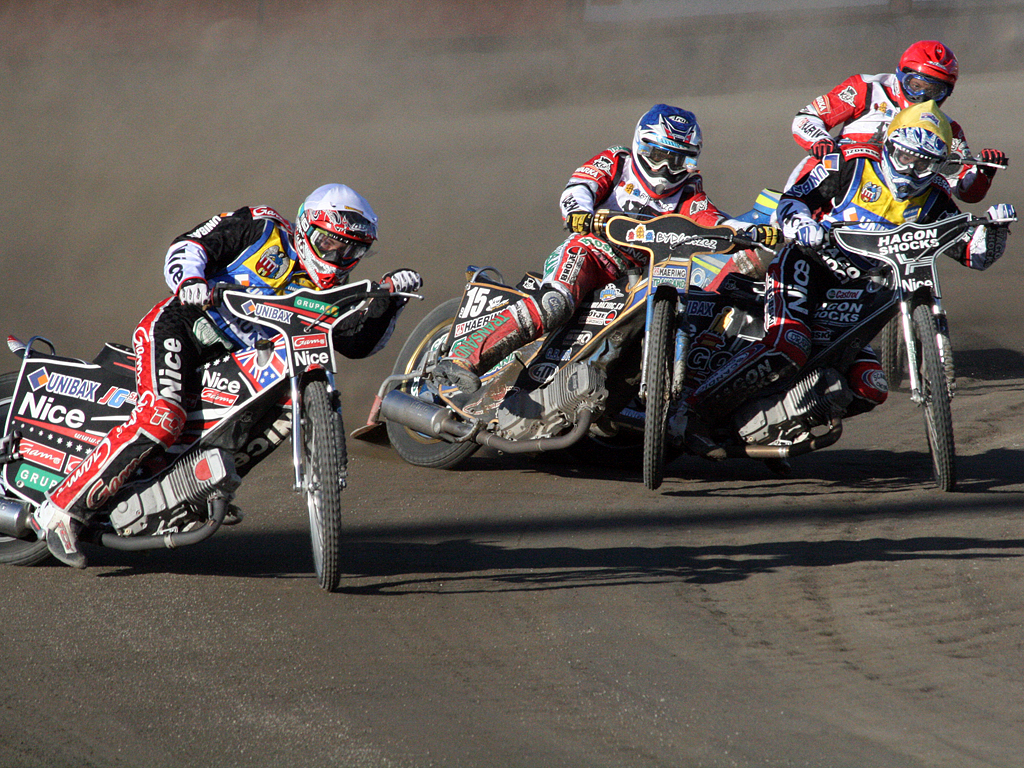
Derby match with KS Toruń, 2009

The Klub Sportowy "Polonia" (Sport's Club "Polonia") was created in 1920 and the motorcycle section in 1946. The team participated in the first Team Speedway Polish Championship during the 1948 finishing 3rd in the second division.

The team won the second division in 1949 and in 1951 won the silver medal in the first division. During the 1950s the club became a major force medalling four more times including winning the league and gold medal in winning the 1955.

In 1971 the team won their second gold medal and they won the Polish Pairs Speedway Championship in 1974. Bolesław Proch won the Golden Helmet in 1981. Former rider and coach at the time Mieczysław Połukard was killed in a centre green accident in 1985.

The 1990s and early 2000s was a golden period for the club as they won five Polish team championships, ten Polish Pairs Speedway Championships and eight individual championships (six of them won by Tomasz Gollob). In 1991, Tony Rickardsson and Peter Karlsson became the first foreign riders for the club.

In 2007, the team was relegated from the top division for the first time in their history and the club underwent a period of mediocrity. In 2019 the team won the 2. Liga.

=== Previous teams ===
Extended content

2007 Team

- Seniors:
- (Sweden) Andreas Jonsson (c)
- (Poland) Rafal Okoniewski
- (Poland) Krystian Klecha
- (Poland) Michał Szczepaniak
- (Poland) Mariusz Staszewski
- (Sweden) Jonas Davidsson
- Juniors:
- (Poland) Krzysztof Buczkowski
- (Poland) Marcin Jędrzejewski
- (Russia) Emil Saifutdinov
- (Poland) Michał Łopaczewski*
- (Poland) Marcin Mazur*
- Coach: (Poland) Zdzisław Rutecki

Łopaczewski and Mazur was started only in PC Junior Team and PC Junior Pair

- Statistics in 2007 Speedway Ekstraliga

Pos	Name	Match	Heats	1st	2nd	3rd	4th	E	F	X	T	Pts	Bon	Total	Joker			CMA	Home	Away
13	(Sweden) Andreas Jonsson	11	58	18	23	11	4	1	1			115	6	121	8	2.017	11.00	8.07	2.065	1.963
26	(Sweden) Jonas Davidsson	9	41	11	9	11	8	1			1	62	7	69		1.683	7.67	6.73	1.400	1.952
29	(Poland) Rafał Okoniewski	15	78	17	22	21	12	4			2	116	12	128		1.641	8.53	6.56	1.973	1.341
33	(Poland) Krystian Klecha	12	45	8	10	15	9	2	1			59	9	68		1.511	5.67	6.04	1.667	1.278
36	(Russia) Emil Saifutdinov	9	41	6	10	13	9		3			51	9	60		1.463	6.67	5.85	1.833	1.174
37	(Poland) Krzysztof Buczkowski	13	56	12	13	13	14	2		2		77	6	83	4	1.446	6.38	5.79	1.586	1.296
38	(Poland) Michał Szczepaniak	15	70	7	24	14	23	1		1		83	15	98		1.400	6.53	5.60	1.632	1.125
41	(Poland) Mariusz Staszewski	11	42	6	6	20	9	1				50	7	57		1.357	5.18	5.43	1.632	1.130
42	(Poland) Marcin Jędrzejewski	13	49	5	1	18	13			1	1	55	11	66		1.347	5.08	5.39	1.762	1.036

2008 Team

- Seniors:
- (Sweden) Andreas Jonsson (c) - 8.07 (E)
- (Sweden) Jonas Davidsson - 6.73 (E)
- (Poland) Rafał Okoniewski - 6.56 (E)
- (Poland) Krzysztof Buczkowski - 5.79 (E)
- (Poland) Jacek Gollob - 4.88 (E)
- (Germany) Christian Hefenbrock - 8.67 (1)
- (United Kingdom) Simon Stead - 6.72 (1)
- (Russia) Denis Saifutdinov - N
- Juniors:
- (Russia) Emil Saifutdinov - 5.85 (E)
- (Poland) Marcin Jędrzejewski - 5.39 (E)
- (Sweden) Andreas Messing - 1.67 (E)
- (Poland) Michał Łopaczewski - 5.25 (2)
- (Sweden) Linus Sundström - N
- (Poland) Damian Adamczak - N
- Coach: (Poland) Zenon Plech

2012 Team

- Seniors:
- (Russia) Emil Sayfutdinov - Grand Prix - 23 - 2.539 (I league)
- (Russia) Artem Laguta - 22 - 1.371
- (Poland) Tomasz Gapiński - 30 - 2.224 (I league)
- (Poland) Krzysztof Buczkowski - 26 - 2.294 (I league)
- (Poland) Robert Kościecha - 35 - 2.124 (I league)
- (United Kingdom) Josh Auty - 22 - 0.000 (n - II league)
- (Russia) Denis Saifutdinov - 31 - N
- (Russia) Daniil Ivanov - 26 - 1.956 (II league)
- Juniors:
- (Poland) Szymon Woźniak - 19 - 1.288 (I league)
- (Poland) Mikołaj Curyło - 20 - 1.276 (I league)
- (Poland) Karol Jóźwik - 18 - 0.500 (I league)
- Coach: (Poland) Robert Sawina

2022 team

- (Denmark) Kenneth Bjerre
- (Denmark) Benjamin Basso
- (Slovenia) Matej Žagar
- (Latvia) Oļegs Mihailovs
- (Poland) Daniel Jeleniewski
- (Poland) Adrian Miedziński
- (Poland) Wiktor Przyjemski
- (Poland) Przemyslaw Konieczny
- (Poland) Bartosz Glogowski

2023 team

- (Denmark) Kenneth Bjerre
- (France) David Bellego
- (Denmark) Andreas Lyager
- (Denmark) Benjamin Basso
- (Poland) Daniel Jeleniewski
- (Latvia) Oļegs Mihailovs
- (Poland) Wiktor Przyjemski
- (Poland) Bartosz Glogowski
- (Poland) Szymon Szlauderbach
- (Poland) Olivier Buszkiewicz
- (Poland) Tomasz Gąsior
- (Poland) Bartosz Nowak

=== Competitions ===
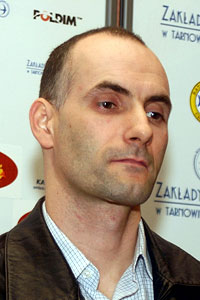
Tomasz Gollob won Criterium of Aces 14 times.

Speedway Grand Prix Polonia Bydgoszcz hosted the Speedway Grand Prix of Poland in the Polonia Bydgoszcz Stadium (1998–99, since 2001). In 2000 Polonia hosted Speedway Grand Prix of Europe. Tomasz Gollob won in Bydgoszcz SGP 6 times.

Pomeranian-Kuyavian Derby The Pomeranian-Kuyavian Derby is the name given to speedway matches between Polonia Bydgoszcz and Unibax Toruń.

Criterium of Aces

The Mieczysław Połukard Criterium of Polish Speedway League Aces (Polish: Kryterium Asów Polskich Lig Żużlowych im. Mieczysława Połukarda) usually referred to as the Criterium of Aces (Kryterium Asów) is an annual speedway event held each year, which is organized by the Polonia Bydgoszcz.

The Criterium of Aces is held in the Polonia Stadium in Bydgoszcz. It is seen by riders and fans as the official opening of the new season. It was first staged in 1982, although a similar meeting was held in the 1951 as Criterium of Aces (Criterium Asów). The most successful rider in Criterium history is Tomasz Gollob (former Polonia's rider). He won Criterium 14 times between 1990 and 2008.

=== Honours ===
Competitions	Total	Golden medals		Silver medals		Bronze medals
Competitions	Total	Total	Years	Total	Years	Total	Years
Team (DMP) (since 1948)	25	7	1955, 1971, 1992, 1997, 1998, 2000, 2002	7	1951, 1953, 1972, 1986, 1987, 1993, 2005	11	1956, 1957, 1960, 1961, 1964, 1988, 1990, 1995, 2001, 2003, 2006
Team U-21 (MDMP) (since 1978)	7	1	1976, 1989	3	1986, 1988, 1992	3	1977, 1978, 1987, 2002
Pairs (MPPK) (since 1974)	18	11	1974, 1990, 1991, 1993, 1994, 1995, 1996, 1997, 1999, 2000, 2002	6	1979, 1992, 1998, 2001, 2005, 2006	1	2010
Pairs U-21 (MMPPK) (1980 U-23; since 1983)	7	1	1980	4	1985, 1986, 1987, 2006	2	1988, 2001
Individual (IMP) (since 1948)	18	8	1992, 1993, 1994, 1995, 1998, 1999, 2001, 2002	5	1953, 1985, 1998, 1999, 2003	5	1951, 1955, 1972, 1990, 1997
Individual U-21 (MIMP) (since 1967)	12	8	1970, 1976, 1977, 1978, 1986, 1990, 1991, 1992	1	1987	3	1969, 1976, 1988
Total Polish Championship medals: 87		Gold: 36		Silver: 26		Bronze: 25
Competitions	Total	I place		II place		III place
Competitions	Total	Total	Years	Total	Years	Total	Years
European Club (KPE) (since 1998)	3	3	1998, 1999, 2001
Team Cup (DPP) (?)	0
Golden Helmet (ZK) (since 1961)	16	10	1981, 1992, 1994, 1995, 1996, 1997, 1998, 2000, 2001, 2002	4	1967, 1972, 1996, 2002	2	2002, 2005
Silver Helmet U-21 (SK) (since 1966)	13	6	1984, 1986, 1987, 1999, 1992, 2007	2	1968, 1988	5	1966, 1984, 1985, 1987, 1988
Bronze Helmet U-19 (BK) (1976-81; since 1983)	10	2	1984, 2002, 2023	4	1985, 1988, 1995, 1996, 2000	4	1991, 1999, 2005, 2006

=== Stadium ===
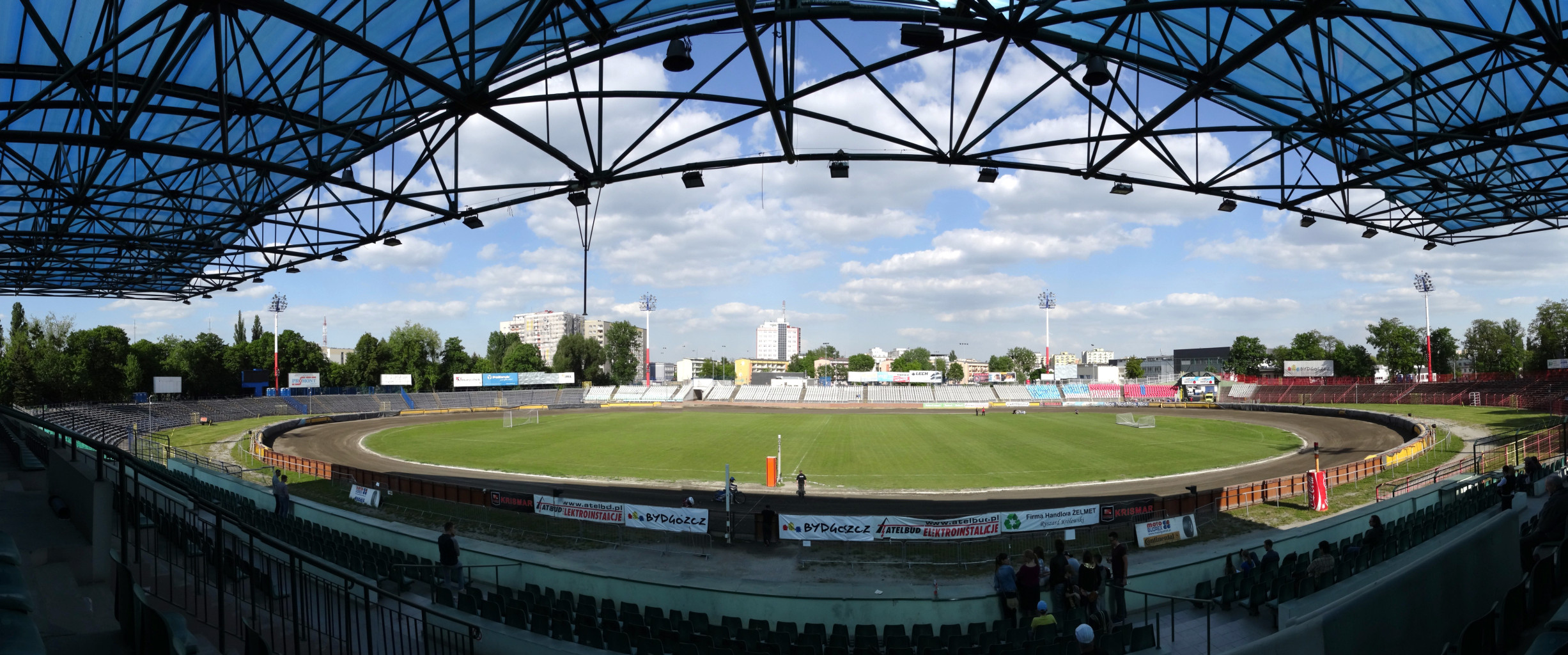
Stadion Miejski im. Józefa Piłsudskiego

The stadium is located on ulica Sportowa 2 (Sports Street). It contains 20,000 seats. The track is 348 metres long and has a granite surface. The track record was made by Tomasz Gollob (60.11 sec on 20 June 1999).

== Football section ==
Polonia Bydgoszcz played 7 seasons in the Ekstraklasa, and their greatest successes were 5th place in 1960 Ekstraklasa and the Polish U-19 Championship in 1980. Polonia Bydgoszcz ranks 53rd in the all-time Ekstraklasa table. Polonia Bydgoszcz's football section competes in the IV liga Kuyavia-Pomerania. Their home ground is Stadion Miejski im. Józefa Piłsudskiego.

== Ice hockey section ==
Polonia Bydgoszcz ice hockey team enjoyed its greatest success in the 1950s and 1960s, when it was twice second (1954, 1955) and twice third (1964, 1965) in the Polish top division.

== See also ==
- Category:Polonia Bydgoszcz riders
