= 2019 Polish speedway season =

Motorcycle racing competition

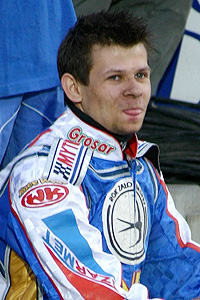
- Janusz Kołodziej won the Polish title for the fourth time

The 2019 Polish Speedway season was the 2019 season of motorcycle speedway in Poland.

== Individual ==
=== Polish Individual Speedway Championship ===
The 2019 Individual Speedway Polish Championship final was held on 14 July at Leszno. Janusz Kołodziej won the Polish Championship for the fourth time.

Pos.	Rider	Club	Pts	Total
1	Janusz Kołodziej	Leszno	3,3,1,2,3	12+2+3
2	Bartosz Zmarzlik	Gorzów Wlkp.	3,3,3,3,3	15+2
3	Maciej Janowski	Wrocław	3,2,3,3,2	13+1
4	Piotr Pawlicki Jr.	Leszno	3,w,2,3,3	11+3+0
5	Przemysław Pawlicki	Grudziądz	2,1,3,3,0	9+1
6	Patryk Dudek	Zielona Góra	2,2,3,1,3	11+0
7	Maksym Drabik	Wrocław	1,3,2,0,2	8
8	Dominik Kubera	Leszno	1,3,2,1,1	8
9	Norbert Kościuch	Toruń	2,0,1,2,2	7
10	Krystian Pieszczek	Gdańsk	t,2,0,2,2	6
11	Adrian Miedziński	Częstochowa	1,2,2,w,d	5
12	Oskar Fajfer	Gniezno	2,1,0,1,0	4
13	Wiktor Lampart	Lublin	0,1,1,2,0	4
14	Kacper Gomólski	Gdańsk	1,d,1,d,1	3
15	Piotr Protasiewicz	Zielona Góra	0,0,0,1,1	2
16	Adrian Cyfer	Gdańsk	0,1,0,0,1	2
17	Bartosz Smektała (res)	Leszno	0	0
18	Adrian Gała (res)	Gniezno	ns	

=== Golden Helmet ===
The 2019 Golden Golden Helmet (Polish: Turniej o Złoty Kask, ZK) organised by the Polish Motor Union (PZM) was the 2019 event for the league's leading riders. The final was held at Gdańsk on the 11 October. Krzysztof Kasprzak won the Golden Helmet.

Pos.	Rider	Club	Total	Points
1	Krzysztof Kasprzak	Gorzów Wlkp.	15	(3,3,3,3,3)
2	Jakub Jamróg	Wrocław	13	(3,3,2,3,2)
3	Piotr Protasiewicz	Zielona Góra	9	(3,2,3,w,1)
4	Krystian Pieszczek	Gdańsk	8+3	(2,0,2,3,1)
5	Dominik Kubera	Leszno	8+2	(2,2,1,0,3)
6	Adrian Miedziński	Częstochowa	8+1	(2,2,0,2,2)
7	Bartosz Smektała	Leszno	7	(0,3,1,0,3)
8	Patryk Dudek	Zielona Góra	7	(1,0,3,1,2)
9	Szymon Woźniak	Gorzów Wlkp.	7	(3,1,2,1,0)
10	Paweł Przedpełski	Częstochowa	6	(1,3,0,2,0)
11	Norbert Kościuch	Toruń	6	(0,1,3,1,1)
12	Tobiasz Musielak	Łódź	6	(1,1,1,3,0)
13	Krzysztof Buczkowski	Grudziądz	6	(2,2,u,2,0)
14	Kacper Woryna	Rybnik	6	(1,1,0,2,2)
15	Janusz Kołodziej	Leszno	5	(0,0,1,1,3)
16	Kacper Gomólski	Gdańsk	3	(0,0,2,0,1)
17	Karol Żupiński	Gdańsk	ns	

=== Junior Championship ===
- winner - Jakub Miśkowiak

=== Silver Helmet ===
- winner - Dominik Kubera

=== Bronze Helmet ===
- winner - Jakub Miśkowiak

== Pairs ==
=== Polish Pairs Speedway Championship ===
The 2019 Polish Pairs Speedway Championship was the 2019 edition of the Polish Pairs Speedway Championship. The final was held on 11 May at Bydgoszcz.

Pos	Team	Pts	Riders
1	Leszno	27	Piotr Pawlicki Jr. 11, Jarosław Hampel 16
2	Gorzów	23	Bartosz Zmarzlik 14, Szymon Woźniak 9
3	Bydgoszcz	19	Kamil Brzozowski 9, Josh Grajczonek 10
4	Częstochowa	18	Paweł Przedpełski 12, Damian Dróżdż 6
5	Ostrów	16	Grzegorz Walasek 9, Tomasz Gapiński 7
6	Toruń	15	Norbert Kościuch 9, Igor Kopeć-Sobczyński 4, Maksymilian Bogdanowicz 2
7	Wrocław	7	Maksym Drabik 1, Jakub Jamróg 0, Przemysław Liszka 6

== Team ==
=== Team Speedway Polish Championship ===
The 2019 Team Speedway Polish Championship was the 2019 edition of the Team Polish Championship. Unia Leszno won the gold medal for the third successive season. The team included Emil Saifutdinov, Janusz Kołodziej, Piotr Pawlicki Jr., Bartosz Smektała and Jarosław Hampel.

==== Ekstraliga ====
Pos	Team	P	W	D	L	Pts	BP	Total	Diff
1	Unia Leszno	14	12	1	1	25	7	32	+188
2	WTS Sparta Wrocław	14	10	0	4	20	6	26	+69
3	Falubaz Zielona Góra	14	8	0	6	16	4	20	+46
4	Włókniarz Częstochowa	14	6	2	6	14	5	19	–24
5	GKM Grudziądz	14	6	1	7	13	3	16	–2
6	Motor Lublin	14	4	1	9	9	2	11	–54
7	Stal Gorzów Wielkopolski	14	5	1	8	11	0	11	–70
8	KS Toruń	14	2	0	12	4	1	5	–153

Play offs

Team	Team	Team	Score
semi final	Częstochowa	Leszno	38:52, 38:52
semi final	Zielona Góra	Wrocław	48:42, 34:56
final	Wrocław	Leszno	43:47, 31:59

==== 1.Liga ====
Pos	Team	P	W	D	L	Diff	Pts	BP	Total
1	ROW Rybnik	12	9	0	3	18	4	22	+110
2	TŻ Ostrovia Ostrów	12	7	1	4	15	3	18	–8
3	Start Gniezno	12	6	1	5	13	4	17	+6
4	Unia Tarnów	12	7	0	5	14	3	17	+16
5	Wybrzeże Gdańsk	12	5	0	7	10	3	13	–32
6	Lokomotiv Daugavpils (Latvia)	12	4	0	8	8	3	11	–43
7	Orzeł Łódź	12	3	0	9	6	1	7	–49

Play offs

Team	Team	Team	Score
semi final	Tarnów	Rybnik	40:50, 36:54
semi final	Gniezno	Ostrów	49:40, 40:50
final	Ostrów	Rybnik	46:44, 41:49

==== 2.Liga ====
Pos	Team	P	W	D	L	Diff	Pts	BP	Total
1	Polonia Bydgoszcz	12	10	1	1	21	5	26	+133
2	PSŻ Poznań	12	9	0	3	18	5	23	+193
3	Kolejarz Opole	12	8	0	4	16	5	21	+142
4	Wilki Krosno	12	6	0	6	12	2	14	–3
5	Polonia Piła	12	5	0	7	10	3	13	–38
6	Kolejarz Rawicz	12	3	1	8	7	1	8	–35
7	Wanda Kraków	12	0	0	12	0	0	0	–392

Play offs

Team	Team	Team	Score
semi final	Krosno	Bydgoszcz	37:53, 35:55
semi final	Opole	Poznań	49:41, 39:51
final	Poznań	Bydgoszcz	59:31, 29:61
