= 1975 Polish speedway season =

Motorcycle racing competition

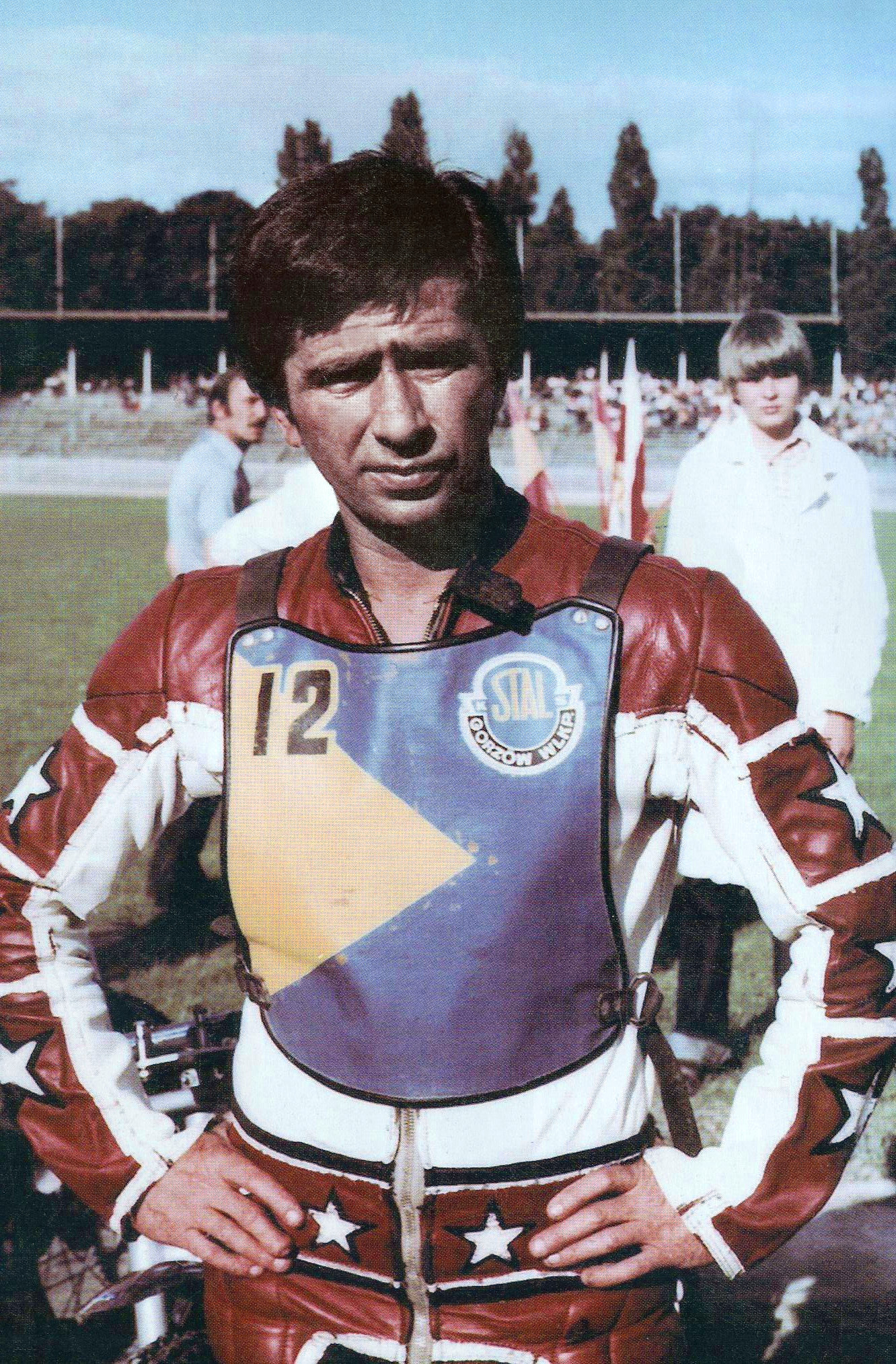
- Edward Jancarz, 1975 Polish champion and Golden Helmet winner

The 1975 Polish Speedway season was the 1975 season of motorcycle speedway in Poland.

== Individual ==
=== Polish Individual Speedway Championship ===
The 1975 Individual Speedway Polish Championship final was held on 28 September at Czestochowa.

Pos.	Rider	Club	Total	Points
1	Edward Jancarz	Gorzów Wlkp.	15	(3,3,3,3,3)
2	Marek Cieślak	Częstochowa	13 +3	(2,3,3,3,2)
3	Paweł Waloszek	Świętochłowice	13 +2	(2,3,3,2,3)
4	Józef Jarmuła	Częstochowa	11	(3,w,2,3,3)
5	Henryk Glücklich	Bydgoszcz	9	(2,1,3,3,0)
6	Ryszard Jany	Wrocław	8	(1,1,2,2,2)
7	Jerzy Padewski	Gorzów Wlkp.	7	(3,1,0,0,3)
8	Andrzej Tkocz	Rybnik	7	(0,3,0,2,2)
9	Zenon Plech	Gorzów Wlkp.	7	(3,w,1,2,1)
10	Grzegorz Kuźniar	Rzeszów	6	(0,2,2,1,1)
11	Andrzej Jurczyński	Częstochowa	5	(2,0,1,1,1)
12	Bogusław Nowak	Gorzów Wlkp.	4	(w,2,2,0,0)
13	Piotr Pyszny	Rybnik	4	(u,1,0,1,2)
14	Jerzy Rembas	Gorzów Wlkp.	4	(1,w,1,1,1)
15	Ryszard Fabiszewski	Gorzów Wlkp.	2	(1,0,1,0,0)
16	Mieczysław Woźniak	Gorzów Wlkp.	0	(0,0,0,0,0)
17	Jerzy Kowalski (res)	Leszno	5	(1,2,0,2)
18	Jerzy Kniaź (res)	Rzeszów	ns	

=== Golden Helmet ===
The 1975 Golden Golden Helmet (Polish: Turniej o Złoty Kask, ZK) organised by the Polish Motor Union (PZM) was the 1975 event for the league's leading riders.

Calendar

Date	Venue	Winner
3 IV	Wrocław	Zygfryd Kostka (Wrocław)
10 IV	Częstochowa	Marek Cieślak (Częstochowa)
8 V	Rybnik	Edward Jancarz (Gorzów Wlkp.)
22 V	Gorzów Wlkp.	Zenon Plech (Gorzów Wlkp.)
5 VI	Leszno	Bogusław Nowak (Gorzów Wlkp.)
3 VII	Opole	Franciszek Stach (Opole)
7 VIII	Bydgoszcz	Edward Jancarz (Gorzów Wlkp.)
19 X	Gdańsk	Bogusław Nowak (Gorzów Wlkp.)

Final classification Note: Result from final score was subtracted with two the weakest events.

Pos.	Rider	Club	Total	WRO	CZE	RYB	GOR	LES	OPO	BYD	GDA
1	Edward Jancarz	Stal Gorzów Wlkp.	73	8	9	13	13	7	10	15	13
2	Zenon Plech	Stal Gorzów Wlkp.	64	13	-	8	15	7	9	12	-
3	Bogusław Nowak	Stal Gorzów Wlkp.	62	4	10	2	9	14	7	8	14
4	Jerzy Rembas	Stal Gorzów Wlkp.	59	2	4	8	10	11	9	9	12
5	Marek Cieślak	Włókniarz Częstochowa	59	5	14	8	14	5	8	10	5
6	Paweł Waloszek	Śląsk Świętochłowice	51	7	5	12	8	9	10	5	-
7	Andrzej Wyglenda	ROW Rybnik	48	10	5	10	5	6	9	8	0
8	Piotr Pyszny	ROW Rybnik	48	4	6	12	9	5	-	10	6
9	Henryk Glücklich	Polonia Bydgoszcz	44	8	10	4	3	5	2	13	4
10	Andrzej Tkocz	ROW Rybnik	44	5	4	3	6	10	6	9	8
11	Piotr Bruzda	Sparta Wrocław	44	13	6	8	9	6	7	7	-
12	Andrzej Jurczyński	Włókniarz Częstochowa	37	0	10	8	5	10	-	-	4
13	Zygfryd Kostka	Sparta Wrocław	34	15	8	6	0	2	3	-	-
14	Franciszek Stach	Kolejarz Opole	34	6	5	5	3	0	11	4	-

== Pairs ==
=== Polish Pairs Speedway Championship ===
The 1975 Polish Pairs Speedway Championship was the 1975 edition of the Polish Pairs Speedway Championship. The final was held at Leszno on 27 September.

Pos	Team	Pts	Riders
1	Stal Gorzów Wlkp.	30	Jerzy Rembas 18, Bogusław Nowak 12
2	Sparta Wrocław	20	Ryszard Jany 10, Robert Słaboń 10
3	ROW Rybnik	19	Jerzy Wilim 10, Andrzej Wyglenda 9
4	Polonia Bydgoszcz	15	Henryk Glücklich 12, Andrzej Koselski 3
5	Włókniarz Częstochowa	15	Czesław Goszczyński 11, Jerzy Kowalczyk 4
6	Wybrzeże Gdańsk	13	Leszek Marsz 10, Bolesław Ślaz 3
7	Kolejarz Opole	13	Leonard Raba 10, Marian Witelus 3

=== Junior Championship ===
- winner - Bolesław Proch

=== Silver Helmet ===
- winner - Bolesław Proch

== Team ==
=== Team Speedway Polish Championship ===
The 1975 Team Speedway Polish Championship was the 1975 edition of the Team Polish Championship.

Stal Gorzów Wielkopolski won the gold medal. The team included Edward Jancarz, Zenon Plech and Jerzy Rembas.

=== First League ===
Pos	Club	Pts	W	D	L	+/−
1	Stal Gorzów Wielkopolski	22	11	0	3	+145
2	Włókniarz Częstochowa	16	8	0	6	+55
3	Unia Leszno	14	7	0	7	–5
4	Kolejarz Opole	14	7	0	7	–90
5	Sparta Wrocław	13	6	1	7	+5
6	ROW Rybnik	12	6	0	8	+1
7	Polonia Bydgoszcz	11	5	1	8	–14
8	Wybrzeże Gdańsk	10	5	0	9	–97

=== Second League ===
Pos	Club	Pts	W	D	L	+/−
1	Falubaz Zielona Góra	21	10	1	3	+138
2	Stal Toruń	21	10	1	3	+110
3	Śląsk Świętochłowice	19	9	1	4	+107
4	Motor Lublin	18	9	0	5	+260
5	Unia Tarnów	15	7	1	6	–77
6	Start Gniezno	13	6	1	7	–71
7	Stal Rzeszów	5	2	1	11	–195
8	Gwardia Łódź	0	0	0	14	–272
