= 2015 Polish speedway season =

Motorcycle racing season

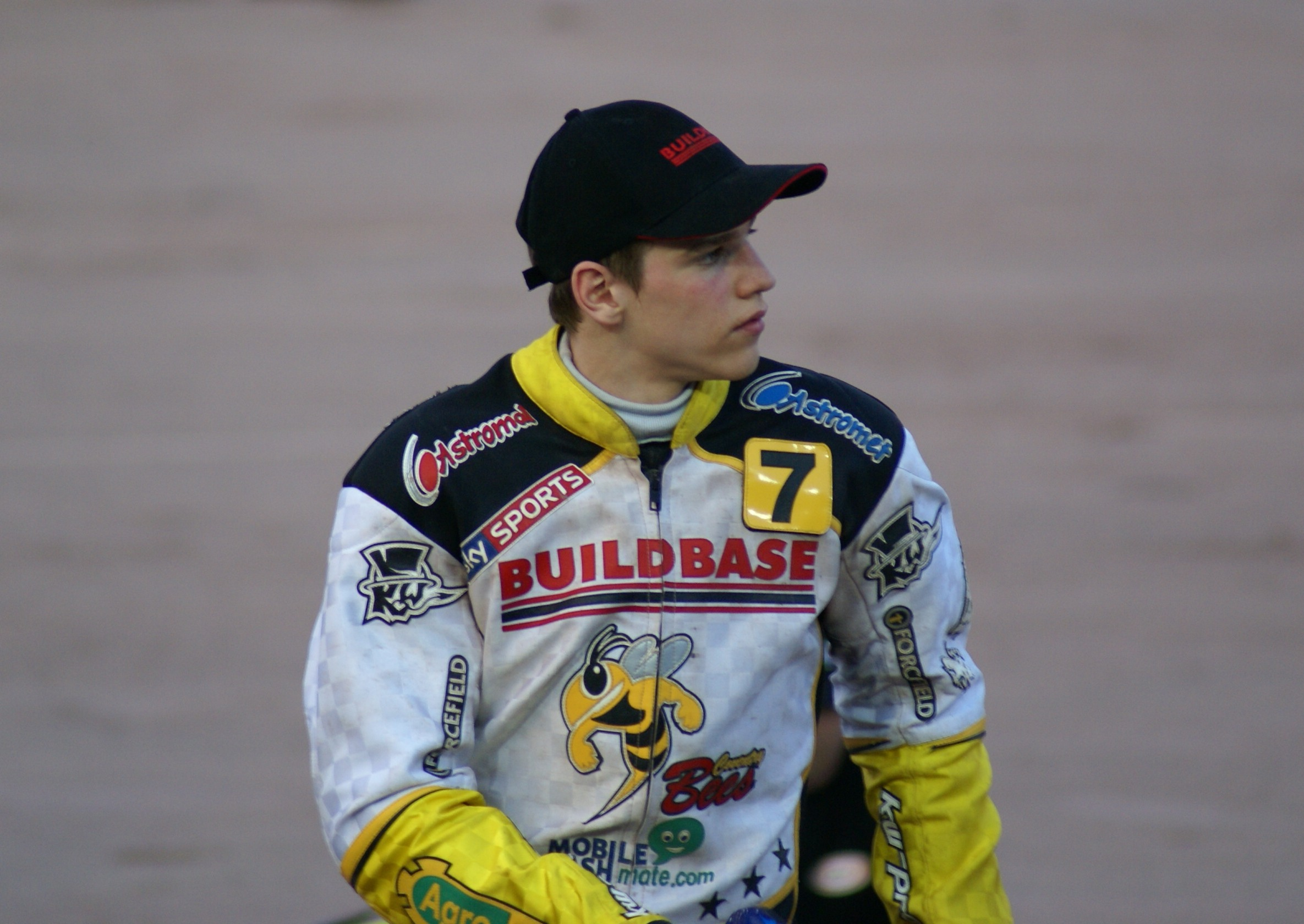
- Przemysław Pawlicki successfully defended his Golden Helmet title.

The 2015 Polish Speedway season was the 2015 season of motorcycle speedway in Poland.

== Individual ==
=== Polish Individual Speedway Championship ===
The 2015 Individual Speedway Polish Championship final was held on 5 July at Gorzów. Maciej Janowski won the Polish Championship for the first time.

Pos.	Rider	Club	Total	Points
1	Maciej Janowski	Wrocław	10+2+3	(2,2,2,2,2)
2	Bartosz Zmarzlik	Gorzów Wlkp.	14+2	(3,2,3,3,3)
3	Tomasz Gapiński	Gorzów Wlkp.	12+3+1	(3,3,3,2,1)
4	Janusz Kołodziej	Tarnów	13+0	(3,3,1,3,3)
5	Grzegorz Zengota	Leszno	11+1	(2,3,w,3,3)
6	Krzysztof Kasprzak	Gorzów Wlkp.	11+0	(0,3,3,3,2)
7	Piotr Świderski	Gorzów Wlkp.	9	(3,2,3,1,0)
8	Mateusz Szczepaniak	Ostrów Wlkp.	7	(1,1,0,2,3)
9	Przemysław Pawlicki	Leszno	7	(2,1,2,1,1)
10	Krzysztof Buczkowski	Grudziądz	6	(2,1,1,w,2)
11	Sebastian Ułamek	Rybnik	5	(1,1,1,0,2)
12	Piotr Protasiewicz	Zielona Góra	5	(1,2,2,0,d)
13	Adrian Cyfer	Gorzów Wlkp.	4	(0,0,2,2,0)
14	Michał Szczepaniak	Ostrów Wlkp.	3	(0,0,1,1,1)
15	Zbigniew Suchecki	Gniezno	2	(1,u,0,0,1)
16	Krystian Pieszczek	Zielona Góra	1	(0,0,0,1,0)
17	Dawid Lampart	Rzeszów	ns	
18	Ernest Koza	Tarnów	ns	

=== Golden Helmet ===
The 2015 Golden Golden Helmet (Polish: Turniej o Złoty Kask, ZK) organised by the Polish Motor Union (PZM) was the 2015 event for the league's leading riders. The final was held at Lublin on the 12 April. Przemysław Pawlicki won the Golden Helmet for the second consecutive year.

Pos.	Rider	Club	Total	Points
1	Przemysław Pawlicki	Leszno	14	(3,3,2,3,3)
2	Mirosław Jabłoński	Rzeszów	13	(3,1,3,3,3)
3	Piotr Pawlicki Jr.	Leszno	12	(2,3,1,3,3)
4	Karol Baran	Rzeszów	10+3	(2,3,3,2,w)
5	Piotr Protasiewicz	Zielona Góra	10+2	(3,3,3,0,1)
6	Tomasz Jędrzejak	Wrocław	10+1	(3,2,d,2,3)
7	Michał Szczepaniak	Ostrów	9	(0,1,3 3,2)
8	Damian Baliński	Rybnik	9	(2,1,2,2,2)
9	Norbert Kościuch	Gniezno	6	(1,0,2,1,2)
10	Krystian Pieszczek	Zielona Góra	6	(1,2,1,1,1)
11	Bartosz Zmarzlik	Gorzów	6	(w,1,2,2,1)
12	Daniel Jeleniewski	Grudziądz	4	(d,2,d,1,1)
13	Krzysztof Jabłoński	Zielona Góra	3	(0,0,1,0,2)
14	Tobiasz Musielak	Leszno	3	(1,2,d,0,d)
15	Dawid Lampart	Rzeszów	3	(1,0,1,1,w)
16	Sebastian Ułamek	Rybnik	2	(2,0,d,0,w)

=== Junior Championship ===
- winner - Bartosz Zmarzlik

=== Silver Helmet ===
- winner - Kacper Woryna

=== Bronze Helmet ===
- winner - Maksym Drabik

== Pairs ==
=== Polish Pairs Speedway Championship ===
The 2015 Polish Pairs Speedway Championship was the 2015 edition of the Polish Pairs Speedway Championship. The final was held on 12 July at Leszno.

Pos	Team	Pts	Riders
1	Unia Leszno	17	Piotr Pawlicki Jr. 12, Tobiasz Musielak 3, Grzegorz Zengota 2
2	Stal Gorzów Wlkp.	17	Krzysztof Kasprzak 7, Bartosz Zmarzlik 10
3	Unia Tarnów	16	Janusz Kołodziej 10, Artur Mroczka 6
4	Stal Rzeszów	11	Dawid Lampart 9, Mirosław Jabłoński 2
5	Ostrovia Ostrów Wlkp.	11	Rune Holta 6, Michał Szczepaniak 2, Mateusz Szczepaniak 3
6	Falubaz Zielona Góra	7	Krzysztof Jabłoński 3, Krystian Pieszczek 3, Mateusz Burzyński 1
7	Orzeł Łódź	5	Stanisław Burza 5, Borys Miturski 0

== Team ==
=== Team Speedway Polish Championship ===
The 2015 Team Speedway Polish Championship was the 2015 edition of the Team Polish Championship. Unia Leszno won the gold medal. The team included the Pawlicki brothers, Nicki Pedersen and Emil Sayfutdinov.

==== Ekstraliga ====
Pos	Team	P	W	D	L	Pts	BP	Total	Diff
1	Unia Leszno	14	12	0	2	24	5	29	+91
2	Unia Tarnów	14	8	1	5	17	4	21	+17
3	WTS Sparta Wrocław	14	6	1	6	13	5	18	+68
4	KS Toruń	14	6	2	6	14	3	17	+27
5	Falubaz Zielona Góra	14	6	1	7	13	3	16	-1
6	Stal Gorzów Wielkopolski	14	5	0	9	10	3	13	+10
7	Stal Rzeszów	14	5	1	8	11	2	13	-26
8	GKM Grudziądz	14	5	0	9	10	0	10	-184

Play offs

Team	Team	Team	Score
semi final	Toruń	Leszno	49:41, 37:53
semi final	Wrocław	Tarnów	54:36, 40:50
final	Wrocław	Leszno	41:49, 45:45

==== 1.Liga ====
Pos	Team	P	W	D	L	Diff	Pts	BP	Total
1	Lokomotiv Daugavpils (Latvia)	12	10	0	2	20	5	25	+147
2	ŻKS ROW Rybnik	12	9	0	3	18	6	24	+207
3	Ostrów Wlkp.	12	9	0	3	18	4	22	+115
4	Polonia Bydgoszcz	12	5	0	7	10	3	13	+11
5	Wanda Kraków	12	4	0	8	8	2	10	-128
6	Orzeł Łódź	12	4	1	7	9	1	10	-124
7	Start Gniezno	12	0	1	11	1	0	1	-228

Play offs

Team	Team	Team	Score
semi final	Bydgoszcz	Daugavpils	45:45, 40:50
semi final	Ostrów	Rybnik	54:36, 41:49
final	Daugavpils	Ostrów	50:40, 41:49

==== 2.Liga ====
Pos	Team	P	W	D	L	Diff	Pts	BP	Total
1	Wybrzeże Gdańsk	8	5	0	3	10	4	14	+73
2	Polonia Piła	8	5	0	3	10	3	13	+78
3	KMŻ Motor Lublin	8	5	1	2	11	2	13	-6
4	KSM Krosno	8	3	1	4	7	1	8	-11
5	Kolejarz Rawicz	8	1	0	7	2	0	0	-134

Play offs

Team	Team	Team	Score
semi final	Krosno	Gdańsk	39:51, 29:61
semi final	Lublin	Piła	0:40, 29:61
final	Piła	Gdańsk	49:41, 36:54
