= 2017 Polish speedway season =

Motorcycle racing competition

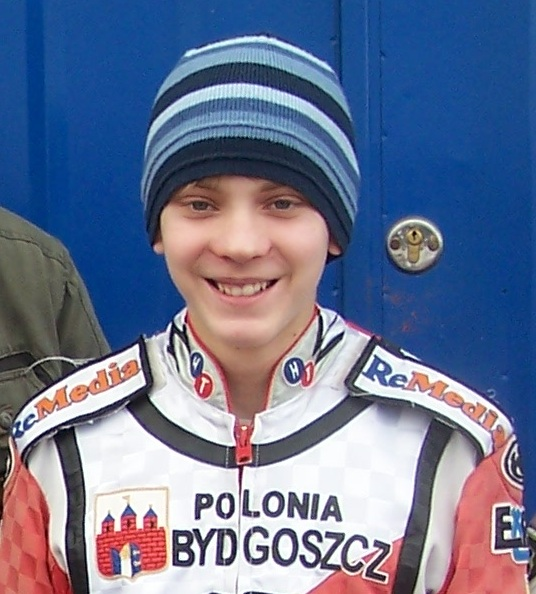
- Szymon Wozniak, 2017 Polish champion

The 2017 Polish Speedway season was the 2017 season of motorcycle speedway in Poland.

== Individual ==
=== Polish Individual Speedway Championship ===
The 2017 Individual Speedway Polish Championship final was held on 2 July at Gorzów. Szymon Woźniak won the Polish Championship.

Pos.	Rider	Club	Total	Points
1	Szymon Woźniak	Wrocław	10+3+3	(3,2,1,1,3)
2	Przemysław Pawlicki	Gorzów Wlkp.	13+2	(3,2,3,2,3)
3	Patryk Dudek	Zielona Góra	10+2+1	(2,2,2,3,1)
4	Jarosław Hampel	Zielona Góra	12+0	(3,3,0,3,3)
5	Janusz Kołodziej	Leszno	11+1	(3,3,2,1,2)
6	Bartosz Zmarzlik	Gorzów Wlkp.	10+0	(1,3,3,1,2)
7	Norbert Kościuch	Piła	8	(1,0,2,3,2)
8	Maciej Janowski	Wrocław	7	(2,3,ef,2,0)
9	Piotr Pawlicki Jr.	Leszno	7	(1,1,1,3,1)
10	Tobiasz Musielak	Rybnik	7	(0,1,2,2,2)
11	Grzegorz Zengota	Leszno	6	(0,w,3,0,3)
12	Krzysztof Buczkowski	Grudziądz	6	(2,u,3,w,1)
13	Dawid Lampart	Rzeszów	6	(2,2,1,0,1)
14	Krystian Pieszczek	Grudziądz	3	(1,t,0,2,0)
15	Mateusz Szczepaniak	Kraków	2	(0,1,u,1,0)
16	Daniel Jeleniewski	Lublin	1	(0,0,1,0,0)
17	Kacper Woryna (res)	Rybnik	0	(w)
18	Kacper Gomólski	Gdańsk	ns	

=== Golden Helmet ===
The 2017 Golden Golden Helmet (Polish: Turniej o Złoty Kask, ZK) organised by the Polish Motor Union (PZM) was the 2017 event for the league's leading riders. The final was held at Zielona Góra on the 20 April. Przemysław Pawlicki won the Golden Helmet.

Pos.	Rider	Club	Total	Points
1	Przemysław Pawlicki	Gorzów Wlkp.	11	2,2,3,2,2
2	Janusz Kołodziej	Leszno	10+3	2,2,2,3,1
3	Piotr Pawlicki Jr.	Leszno	10+2	0,3,2,2,3
4	Maksym Drabik	Wrocław	10+1	1,3,2,1,3
5	Patryk Dudek	Zielona Góra	9	2,1,3,3,0
6	Adrian Miedziński	Toruń	9	3,3,w,2,1
7	Jakub Jamróg	Tarnów	8	3,0,3,2,0
8	Kacper Gomólski	Gdańsk	8	3,1,1,1,2
9	Mateusz Szczepaniak	Kraków	8	1,1,2,3,1
10	Maciej Janowski	Wrocław	7	0,1,3,ef,3
11	Piotr Protasiewicz	Zielona Góra	7	3,0,1,3,0
12	Krzysztof Kasprzak	Gorzów Wlkp.	7	2,3,0,0,2
13	Paweł Przedpełski	Toruń	6	1,2,0,0,3
14	Szymon Woźniak	Wrocław	6	0,2,1,1,2
15	Mirosław Jabłoński	Gniezno	4	1,0,1,1,1
16	Daniel Jeleniewski	Lublin	0	0,0,0,0,0
17	Tomasz Jędrzejak (res)	Wrocław	0	0
18	Oskar Fajfer (res)	Gdańsk	0	0

=== Junior Championship ===
- winner - Bartosz Smektała

=== Silver Helmet ===
- winner - Maksym Drabik

=== Bronze Helmet ===
- winners - Dominik Kubera, Wiktor Lis, Bartosz Smektała

== Pairs ==
=== Polish Pairs Speedway Championship ===
The 2017 Polish Pairs Speedway Championship was the 2017 edition of the Polish Pairs Speedway Championship. The final was held on 23 July at Ostrów Wielkopolski.

Pos	Team	Pts	Riders
1	Gorzów	27	Bartosz Zmarzlik 17, Krzysztof Kasprzak 10
2	Zielona Góra	21	Jarosław Hampel 9, Piotr Protasiewicz 12
3	Grudziądz	20+3	Krystian Pieszczek 8, Krzysztof Buczkowski 12+3
4	Wrocław	20+2	Tomasz Jędrzejak 5, Szymon Woźniak 15+2
5	Toruń	19	Daniel Kaczmarek 1, Grzegorz Walasek 12, Adrian Miedziński 6
6	Łódź	12	Robert Miśkowiak 6, Edward Mazur 6
7	Ostrów	7	Kamil Brzozowski 5, Lukasz Sówka 1, Zbigniew Suchecki 1

== Team ==
=== Team Speedway Polish Championship ===
The 2017 Team Speedway Polish Championship was the 2017 edition of the Team Polish Championship. Unia Leszno won the gold medal. The team included Emil Saifutdinov, Janusz Kołodziej, Piotr Pawlicki Jr. and Bartosz Smektała.

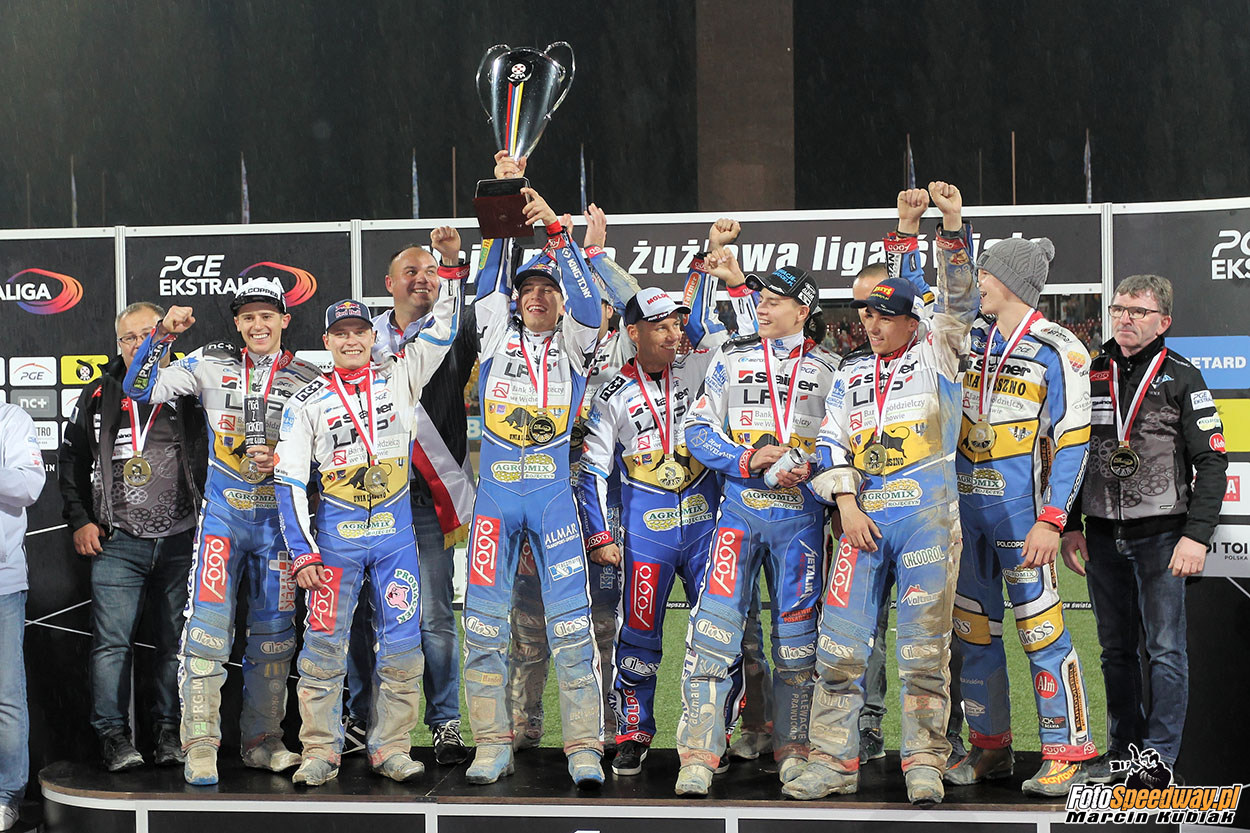
2017 Gold Medalists - Unia Leszno

==== Ekstraliga ====
Pos	Team	P	W	D	L	BP	Pts	Diff
1	Falubaz Zielona Góra	14	9	2	3	5	25	+48
2	WTS Sparta Wrocław	14	9	1	4	6	25	+75
3	Stal Gorzów Wielkopolski	14	8	2	4	5	23	+70
4	Unia Leszno	14	9	0	5	5	23	+86
5	Włókniarz Częstochowa	14	7	1	6	2	17	−61
6	GKM Grudziądz	14	4	1	9	1	10	−63
7	KS Toruń	14	3	0	11	2	8	−74
8	ROW Rybnik	14	3	1	10	1	8	−81

Play offs

Team	Team	Team	Score
semi final	Leszno	Zielona Góra	50:40, 45:45
semi final	Gorzów	Wrocław	43:47, 45:45
final	Leszno	Wrocław	49:41, 45:45

==== 1.Liga ====
Pos	Team	P	W	D	L	Diff	Pts	BP	Total
1	Unia Tarnów	18	14	1	3	29	9	38	+238
2	Wybrzeże Gdańsk	18	10	2	6	22	5	27	+80
3	Lokomotiv Daugavpils (Latvia)	16	7	2	7	16	6	22	+22
4	Orzeł Łódź	16	6	4	6	16	4	20	+47
5	Polonia Piła	14	8	0	6	16	3	19	-27
6	Wanda Kraków	14	7	0	7	14	1	15	-61
7	Stal Rzeszów	16	4	0	12	8	2	10	-143
8	Polonia Bydgoszcz	14	1	1	12	3	0	3	-192

Play offs

Team	Team	Team	Score
semi final	Łódź	Tarnów	45-45, 41–49
semi final	Daugavpils	Gdańsk	46–44, 36–54
final	Gdańsk	Tarnów	40–32, 40–50

==== 2.Liga ====
Pos	Team	P	W	D	L	Diff	Pts	BP	Total
1	Start Gniezno	12	9	1	2	19	6	25	+218
2	Motor Lublin	12	10	0	2	20	5	25	+118
3	Ostrów Wlkp.	12	9	0	3	18	4	22	+65
4	PSŻ Poznań	12	5	0	7	10	2	12	-82
5	KSM Krosno	12	4	1	7	9	2	11	-66
6	Kolejarz Opole	12	3	0	9	6	2	8	-41
7	Kolejarz Rawicz	12	1	0	11	2	0	2	-212

Play offs

Team	Team	Team	Score
semi final	PSŻ Poznań	Gniezno	40:49, 33:57
semi final	Ostrów	Lublin	46:44, 43:47
final	Lublin	Gniezno	50:40, 36:53
