= 2020 Polish speedway season =

Motorcycle racing competition

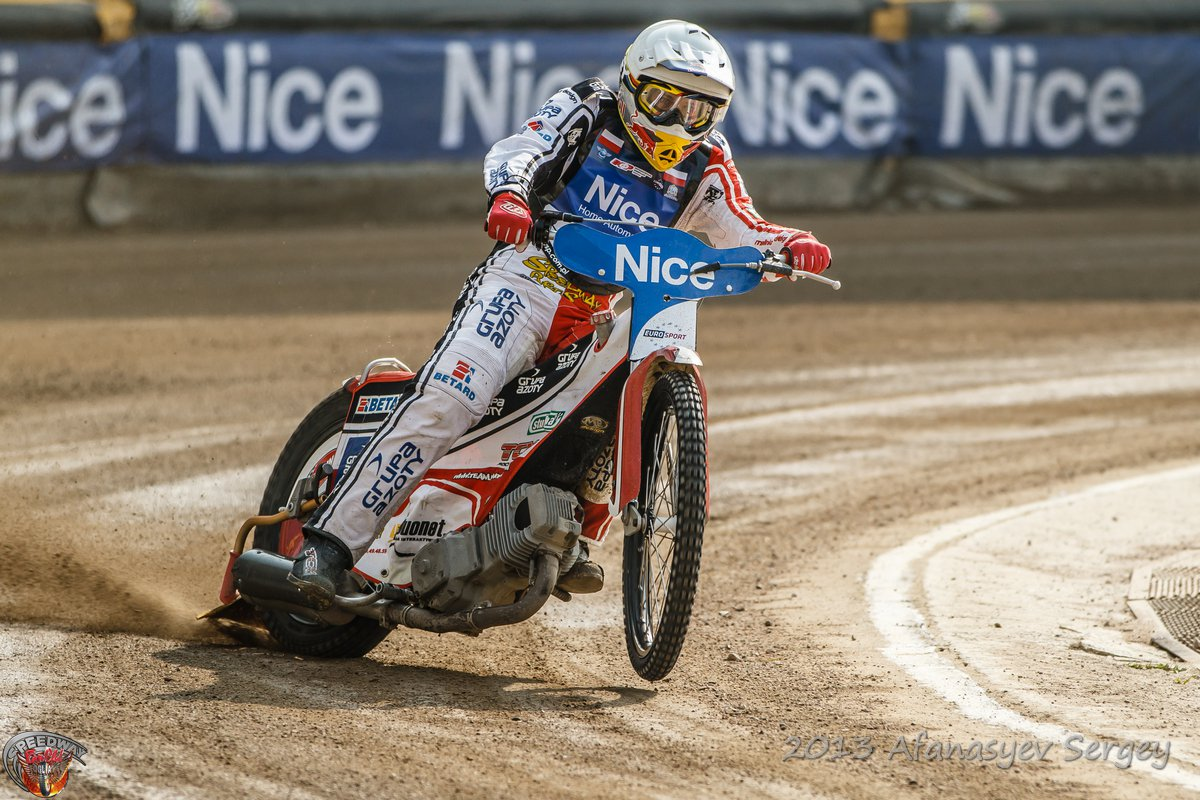
- Maciej Janowski, Polish champion for the second time

The 2020 Polish Speedway season was the 2020 season of motorcycle speedway in Poland.

Unia Leszno won the Ekstraliga and were awarded the gold medal and declared Polish Team Champions. The teams finishing second and third were awarded silver and bronze medals respectively. KS Toruń won the 1. Liga and Wilki Krosno won the 2. Liga.

== Individual ==
=== Polish Individual Speedway Championship ===
The 2020 Individual Speedway Polish Championship final was held on 7 September at the Stadion im. Alfreda Smoczyka in Leszno. Maciej Janowski won the individual title after recording a 15-point maximum in the heats leading up to the final race.

Pos.	Rider	Points	Total	Final
1	Maciej Janowski	(3,3,3,3,3)	15	3
2	Bartosz Zmarzlik	(2,3,1,1,3)	10	2
3	Szymon Woźniak	(3,3,2,3,1)	12	1
4	Janusz Kołodziej	(1,1,3,3,2)	10	0
5	Patryk Dudek	(1,2,3,2,2)	10	
6	Piotr Pawlicki Jr.	(2,2,1,2,3)	10	
7	Maksym Drabik	(3,1,0,3,1)	8	
8	Jarosław Hampel	(3,3,0,1,0)	7	
9	Bartosz Smektała	(1,2,2,1,1)	7	
10	Krystian Pieszczek	(2,0,3,0,1)	6	
11	Kacper Woryna	(1,0,1,0,3)	5	
12	Paweł Przedpełski	(0,t,2,1,2)	5	
13	Dominik Kubera	(0,2,0,2,0)	4	
14	Przemysław Pawlicki	(2,x,2,0,0)	4	
15	Norbert Kościuch	(0,1,0,0,2)	3	
16	Krzysztof Kasprzak	(0,0,1,2,x)	3	
17	Jakub Jamróg (res)	(1)	1	
18	Adrian Miedziński (res)	(dnr)	x	

=== Golden Helmet ===
The 2020 Golden Golden Helmet (Polish: Turniej o Złoty Kask, ZK) organised by the Polish Motor Union (PZM) was the 2020 event for the league's leading riders. The final was held at Bydgoszcz on the 27 July. Bartosz Zmarzlik won the Golden Helmet.

Pos.	Rider	Club	Total	Points
1	Bartosz Zmarzlik	Gorzów Wlkp.	15	(3,3,3,3,3)
2	Paweł Przedpełski	Częstochowa	12+3	(2,3,2,3,2)
3	Krzysztof Kasprzak	Gorzów Wlkp.	12+2	(3,2,3,2,2)
4	Janusz Kołodziej	Leszno	11	(1,2,2,3,3)
5	Jarosław Hampel	Lublin	10	(3,2,0,2,3)
6	Patryk Dudek	Zielona Góra	10	(3,3,2,1,1)
7	Kacper Woryna	Rybnik	9	(0,1,3,3,2)
8	Dominik Kubera	Leszno	7	(1,0,3,2,1)
9	Szymon Woźniak	Gorzów Wlkp.	6+3	(2,1,1,1,1)
10	Bartosz Smektała	Leszno	6+2	(0,2,1,0,3)
11	Jakub Jamróg	Lublin	5	(2,0,0,2,1)
12	Mateusz Cierniak	Tarnów	4	(1,3,0,0,0)
13	Kamil Brzozowski	Bydgoszcz	4	(1,0,1,0,2)
14	Krzysztof Buczkowski	Grudziądz	4	(2,0,1,1,0)
15	Norbert Krakowiak	Zielona Góra	3	(0,1,2,0,0)
16	Jakub Miśkowiak	Częstochowa	2	(0,1,0,1,0)

=== Junior Championship ===
- winner - Dominik Kubera

=== Silver Helmet ===
- winner - Dominik Kubera

=== Bronze Helmet ===
- winner - Mateusz Cierniak

== Pairs ==
=== Polish Pairs Speedway Championship ===
The 2020 Polish Pairs Speedway Championship was the 2020 edition of the Polish Pairs Speedway Championship. The final was held on 5 August at Gdańsk.

Pos	Team	Pts	Riders
1	Leszno	29	Piotr Pawlicki Jr. 13, Dominik Kubera 16
2	Zielona Góra	21+3	Patryk Dudek 8, Piotr Protasiewicz 13+3
3	Wrocław	21+2	Maciej Janowski 14+2, Gleb Chugunov 7
4	Gorzów	18	Bartosz Zmarzlik 13, Szymon Woźniak 5
5	Częstochowa	16	Bartlomiej Kowalski 5, Jakub Miśkowiak 11
6	Gdańsk	11	Krystian Pieszczek 8, Robert Chmiel 2, Karol Zupinski 1
7	Rybnik	10	Przemysław Girea 0, Mateusz Szczepaniak 10

== Team ==
=== Team Speedway Polish Championship ===
The 2020 Team Speedway Polish Championship was the 2020 edition of the Team Polish Championship. Unia Leszno won the gold medal for the fourth successive season. The team included Emil Saifutdinov, Janusz Kołodziej, Piotr Pawlicki Jr., Bartosz Smektała and Dominik Kubera.

==== Ekstraliga ====
Pos	Team	P	W	D	L	BP	Pts
1	Unia Leszno	14	11	0	3	6	28
2	Stal Gorzów	14	8	0	6	5	21
3	WTS Sparta Wrocław	14	7	2	5	4	20
4	Falubaz Zielona Góra	14	8	1	5	3	20
5	Włókniarz Częstochowa	14	6	2	6	5	19
6	Motor Lublin	14	8	0	6	3	19
7	Grudziądz	14	4	1	9	1	10
8	Rybnik	14	1	0	13	0	2

Play-offs

Semi-finals

Team 1	Team 2	Score
Zielona Gora	Leszno	44–46, 33–57
Gorzow	Wroclaw	44–46, 34–55

Final

Team 1	Team 2	Score
Wroclaw	Leszno	46–46, 30–59

==== 1. Liga ====
Pos	Team	P	Pts
1	KS Toruń	14	29
2	Start Gniezno	14	25
3	Orzeł Łódź	14	22
4	Gdańsk	14	17
5	Unia Tarnów	14	15
6	Ostrów	14	14
7	Polonia Bydgoszcz	14	11
8	Daugavpils (Latvia)	14	7

No play-offs due to the COVID-19 pandemic.

==== 2. Liga ====
Pos	Team	P	Pts
1	Wilki Krosno	10	25
2	Kolejarz Opole	10	18
3	PSŻ Poznań	10	10
4	Stal Rzeszów	10	8
5	Kolejarz Rawicz	10	8
6	Wölfe Wittstock (Germany)	10	6

No play-offs due to the COVID-19 pandemic.
