= 2018 Polish speedway season =

Motorcycle racing competition

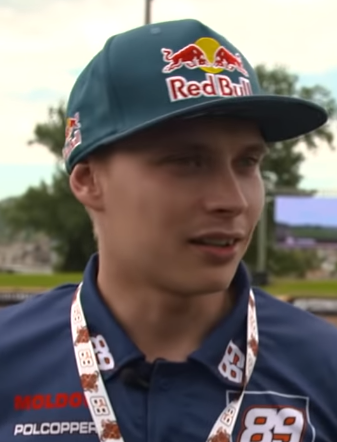
- Emil Saifutdinov, topped the Leszno averages again as the team won a second successive title.

The 2018 Polish Speedway season was the 2018 season of motorcycle speedway in Poland.

== Individual ==
=== Polish Individual Speedway Championship ===
The 2018 Individual Speedway Polish Championship final was held on 4 August at Leszno. Piotr Pawlicki Jr. won the Polish Championship.

Pos.	Rider	Club	Total	Points
1	Piotr Pawlicki Jr.	Leszno	3,3,1,2,2	11+3+3
2	Maciej Janowski	Wrocław	0,d,3,3,3	9+2+2
3	Janusz Kołodziej	Leszno	1,3,3,2,3	12+1
4	Bartosz Zmarzlik	Gorzów	2,3,2,3,3	13+0
5	Bartosz Smektała	Leszno	1,3,3,0,3	10+1
6	Piotr Protasiewicz	Zielona Góra	3,2,2,3,2	12+0
7	Patryk Dudek	Zielona Góra	3,0,1,3,1	8
8	Mateusz Szczepaniak	Rybnik	2,2,2,2,0	8
9	Norbert Kościuch	Łódź	3,2,0,2,0	7
10	Adrian Miedziński	Częstochowa	1,1,2,1,2	7
11	Przemysław Pawlicki	Grudziądz	2,2,w,0,2	6
12	Szymon Woźniak	Gorzów	0,0,3,0,1	4
13	Zbigniew Suchecki	Ostrów	2,0,1,0,1	4
14	Kacper Woryna	Rybnik	1,1,0,1,1	4
15	Daniel Kaczmarek	Toruń	0,1,0,1,0	2
16	Marcin Nowak (res)	Gniezno	0,t,1,1,0	2
17	Tomasz Jędrzejak (res)	Rzeszów	1	1
18	Maksym Drabik	Wrocław	ns	

=== Golden Helmet ===
The 2018 Golden Golden Helmet (Polish: Turniej o Złoty Kask, ZK) organised by the Polish Motor Union (PZM) was the 2018 event for the league's leading riders. The final was held at Piła on the 19 kwietnia. Jarosław Hampel won the Golden Helmet.

Pos.	Rider	Club	Total	Points
1	Jarosław Hampel	Leszno	13	(2,3,3,3,2)
2	Bartosz Zmarzlik	Gorzów Wlkp.	11	(3,3,1,3,1)
3	Janusz Kołodziej	Leszno	10+3	(1,3,1,3,2)
4	Bartosz Smektała	Leszno	10+2	(3,2,3,0,2)
5	Maciej Janowski	Wrocław	10+1	(t,2,3,2,3)
6	Krzysztof Buczkowski	Grudziądz	10	(2,3,2,2,1)
7	Grzegorz Zengota	Zielona Góra	9	(3,1,0,2,3)
8	Dawid Lampart	Lublin	8	(2,0,3,2,1)
9	Krzysztof Kasprzak	Gorzów Wlkp.	7	(1,1,2,t,3)
10	Patryk Dudek	Zielona Góra	6	(3,2,0,1,d)
11	Przemysław Pawlicki	Grudziądz	6	(1,2,2,1,0)
12	Norbert Kościuch	Łódź	6	(2,0,1,1,2)
13	Maksym Drabik	Wrocław	5	(0,1,1,3,0)
14	Oskar Fajfer	Gdańsk	4	(0,1,0,0,3)
15	Dominik Kubera	Leszno	4	(0,0,2,1,1)
16	Kacper Woryna	Rybnik	1	(1)
17	Adrian Cyfer	Piła	0	(0,0,0,0,0)
18	Mateusz Szczepaniak	Rybnik	0	(0)

=== Junior Championship ===
- winner - Daniel Kaczmarek

=== Silver Helmet ===
- winner - Bartosz Smektała

=== Bronze Helmet ===
- winner - Dominik Kubera

== Pairs ==
=== Polish Pairs Speedway Championship ===
The 2018 Polish Pairs Speedway Championship was the 2018 edition of the Polish Pairs Speedway Championship. The final was held on 3 May at Ostrów Wielkopolski.

Pos	Team	Pts	Riders
1	Wrocław	26	Maciej Janowski 11, Maksym Drabik 15
2	Zielona Góra	25	Patryk Dudek 8, Piotr Protasiewicz 10, Grzegorz Zengota 7
3	Częstochowa	18+3	Adrian Miedziński 8, Tobiasz Musielak 10+3
4	Tarnów	18+2	Artur Mroczka 10+2, Jakub Jamrog 8
5	Gorzów	16	Krzysztof Kasprzak 7, Szymon Wozniak 9
6	Leszno	12	Piort Pawlick Jr. 9, Bartosz Smektala 1, Dominik Kubera 2
7	Ostrów	10	Zbigniew Suchecki 4, Patryk Dolny 3, Kamil Brzozoeski 3

== Team ==
=== Team Speedway Polish Championship ===
The 2018 Team Speedway Polish Championship was the 2018 edition of the Team Polish Championship. Unia Leszno won the gold medal for the second successive season. The team included Emil Saifutdinov, Janusz Kołodziej, Piotr Pawlicki Jr., Bartosz Smektała and Jarosław Hampel.

==== Ekstraliga ====
Pos	Team	P	W	D	L	Pts	BP	Total	Diff
1	Unia Leszno	14	10	2	2	22	7	29	+168
2	Stal Gorzów Wielkopolski	14	8	1	5	17	4	21	+43
3	Włókniarz Częstochowa	14	7	2	5	16	3	19	+2
4	WTS Sparta Wrocław	14	7	2	5	16	3	19	+54
5	KS Toruń	14	6	1	7	13	5	18	-19
6	GKM Grudziądz	14	4	2	8	10	2	12	-86
7	Falubaz Zielona Góra	14	4	0	10	8	2	10	-64
8	Unia Tarnów	14	5	0	9	10	0	10	-98

Play offs

Team	Team	Team	Score
semi final	Wrocław	Leszno	42:48, 42:48
semi final	Częstochowa	Gorzów	41:49, 39:51
final	Gorzów	Leszno	46:44, 40:50

==== 1.Liga ====
Pos	Team	P	W	D	L	Diff	Pts	BP	Total
1	Motor Lublin	14	10	1	3	21	5	26	+187
2	ROW Rybnik	14	9	0	5	18	5	23	+181
3	Start Gniezno	14	9	1	4	19	4	23	+66
4	Lokomotiv Daugavpils (Latvia)	14	8	1	5	17	4	21	-4
5	Orzeł Łódź	14	6	2	6	14	4	18	+47
6	Wybrzeże Gdańsk	14	6	0	8	12	3	15	+40
7	Polonia Piła	14	3	0	11	6	1	7	-149
8	Wanda Kraków	14	2	1	11	5	0	5	-368

Play offs

Team	Team	Team	Score
semi final	Daugavpils	Lublin	43:47, 35:55
semi final	Gniezno	Rybnik	45:45, 38:52
final	Rybnik	Lublin	52–38, 37:53

==== 2.Liga ====
Pos	Team	P	W	D	L	Diff	Pts	BP	Total
1	Stal Rzeszów	12	11	1	0	23	6	29	+181
2	Ostrów Wlkp.	12	9	1	2	19	5	24	+137
3	Kolejarz Rawicz	12	6	1	5	13	3	16	+31
4	Kolejarz Opole	12	6	0	6	12	3	15	-29
5	PSŻ Poznań	12	4	1	7	9	2	11	-37
6	Polonia Bydgoszcz	12	3	0	9	6	2	8	-136
7	KSM Krosno	12	1	0	11	2	0	2	-147

Play offs

Team	Team	Team	Score
semi final	Opole	Rzeszów	41:49, 36:54
semi final	Rawicz	Ostrów	47:43, 41:49
final	Ostrów	Rzeszów	44:46, 45:45
