= Polish Extraleague =

Polish Extraleague may refer to:

- Ekstraliga (speedway), the top division of motorcycle speedway in Poland
- Polish Basketball League or Dominet Bank Ekstraliga, the highest level league of professional basketball in Poland
