= Stal Gorzów Wielkopolski =

Polish motorcycle speedway team

Club information
- Track address: Edward Jancarz Stadium (Capacity: 15,200); Gorzów Wielkopolski
- Country: Poland
- Founded: 1947; 79 years ago 1950 (section)
- Team manager: Piotr Paluch
- Team captain: Anders Thomsen
- League: Ekstraliga
- Website: stalgorzow.pl

Club facts
- Colours: yellow and blue
- Track size: 329 metres (360 yd)
- Track record time: 57.72 seconds
- Track record date: 27 March 2026
- Track record holder: Jack Holder

Current team
Rider	CMA
(Czech Republic) Adam Bednář
(Australia) Jack Holder
(Poland) Oskar Paluch
(Norway) Mathias Pollestad
(Poland) Paweł Przedpełski
(Poland) Marcel Szymko
(Denmark) Anders Thomsen

Major team honours
Team champions	1969, 1973, 1975, 1976, 1977, 1978, 1983, 2014, 2016
Pair champions	1973, 1975, 1976, 1977, 1978, 1981, 1992, 1998, 2014, 2017

Stal Gorzów Wielkopolski is a Polish motorcycle speedway team from Gorzów Wielkopolski.

The motorcycle speedway team is one of Poland's most accomplished teams – winning nine Team Speedway Polish Championships and ten Polish Pairs Speedway Championships. It competes in Speedway Ekstraliga (top division).

== History ==
=== Formation and beginnings ===
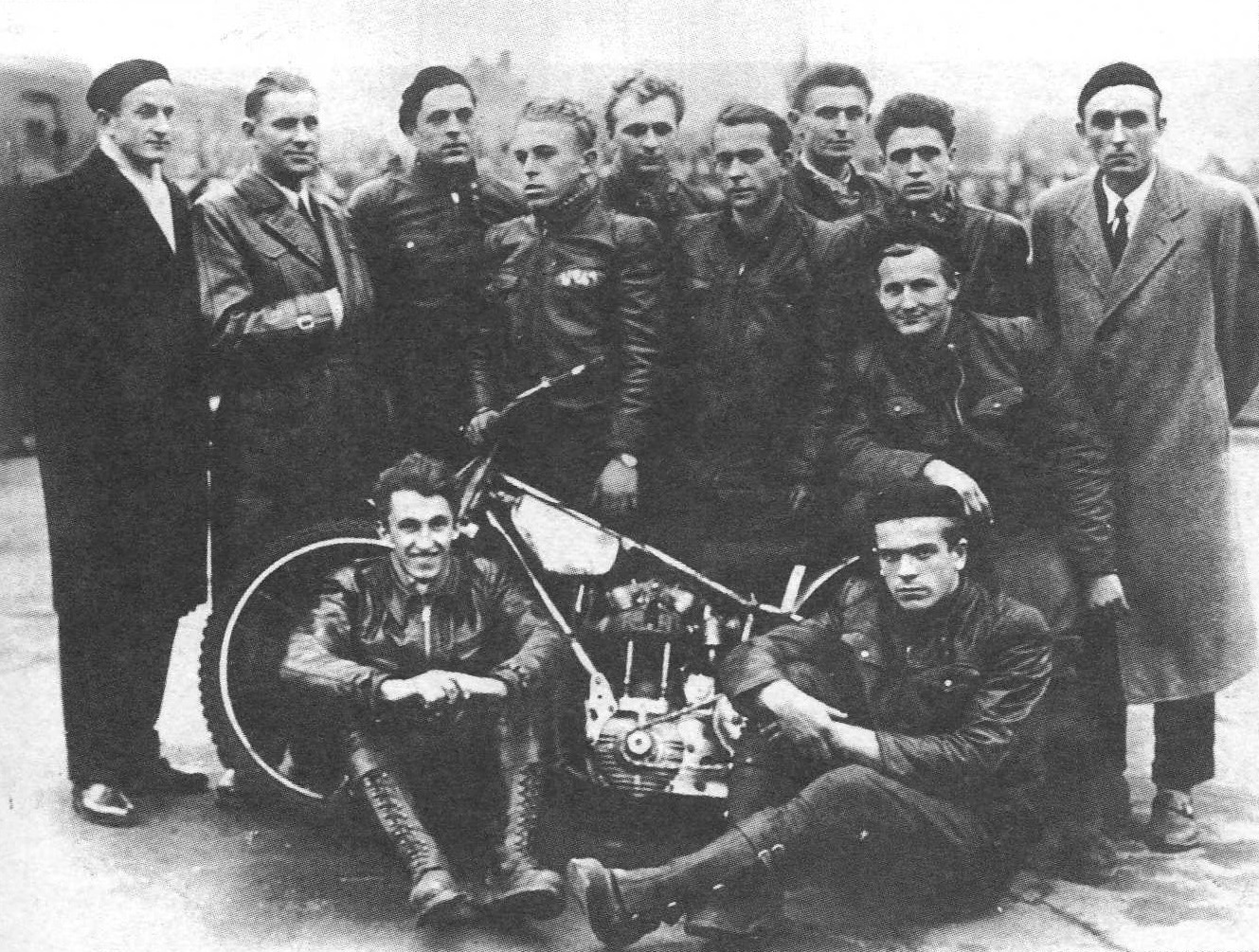
Stal in season 1959

The speedway section of club was officially registered 9 April 1950. At number 60 the register of sports associations was written down trade union sports club of Gorzów Wielkopolski. In July 1951 the club already had own 395-metres with path by the Śląska Street. After a few years of the struggle on III league paths and suspending the operations of the speedway chapter in 1953–1954 years, in 1955 the team is being Gorzów Wielkopolski reported to gameses of the II league. In 1961 the team of Stal in the end fought its way through to gameses of the first division. In the entire season the Gorzów Wielkopolski team suffered only two defeats, but surnames of Edmund Migoś, Bronisław Rogal, Edward Pilarczyk or Jerzy Padewski were already then well known for fans throughout the country. In conclusion of season sports club was an organiser one from series test-match with the representation the USSR. specially to this match, with the help of Mechanical Plants Gorzów and of army unit, an artificial lighting was installed. Match, played on 17 October at hour 22, closed with the minimal victory for the representation of Poland 39:38. They acted in stocks white and red Stal speedway riders: Migoś, Padewski, Andrzej Pogorzelski, E. Pilarczyk and Zdzisław Boniecki. Igor Plechanov was a star of the Soviet team. In the draught of two first seasons in the first division inhabitant of Gorzów Wielkopolski occupied lower areas of the table. 1962 was the year difficult, but after winning play-off matches with Zgrzeblarki Zielona Góra defended Stal one's place in the first division for her no longer to leave for next long years. Only in 1964 the first success is coming in the form of getting a silver medal of the Team Speedway Polish Championship.

=== 1960s and 1970s. „The Golden Era" of the club ===
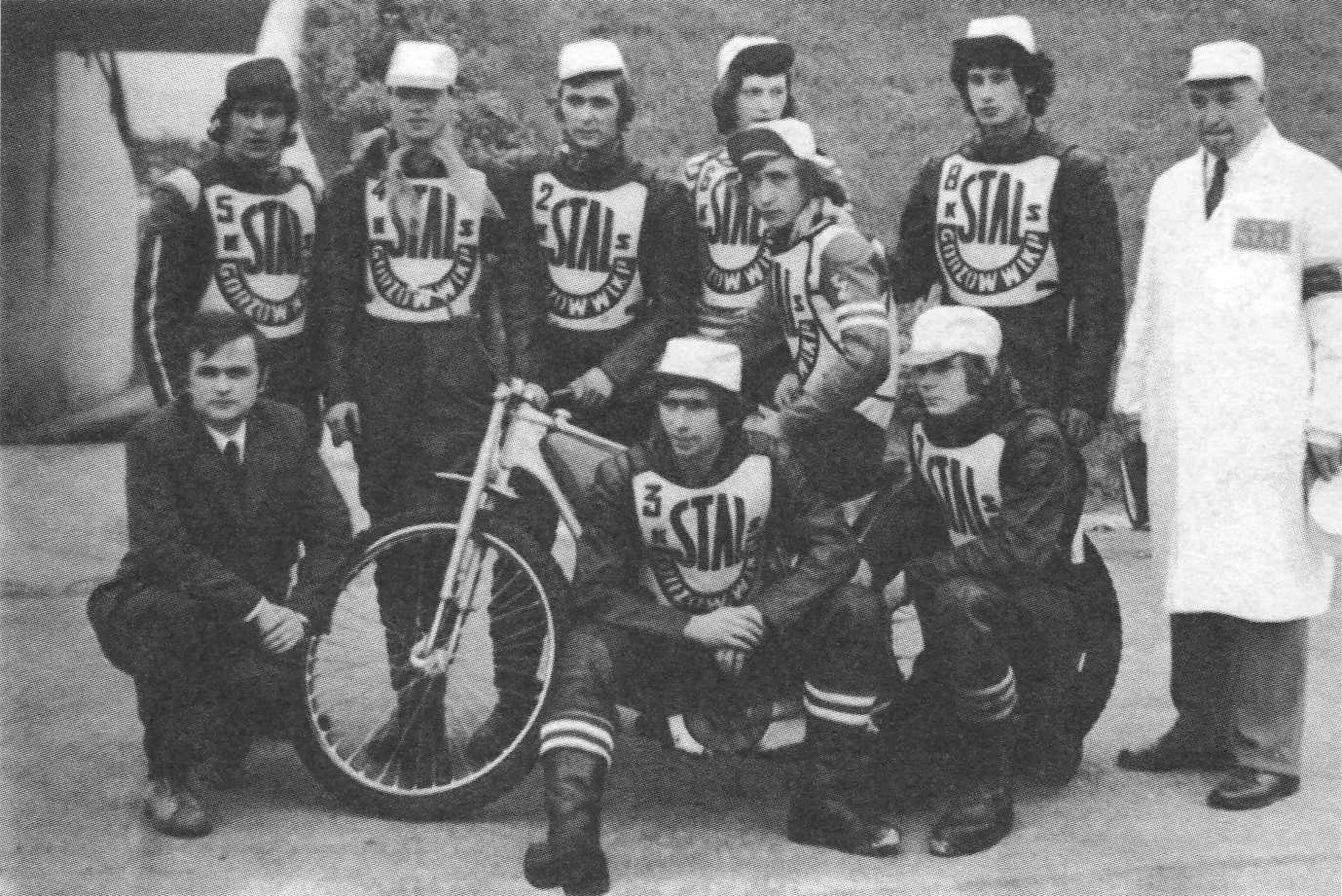
Stal in season 1972

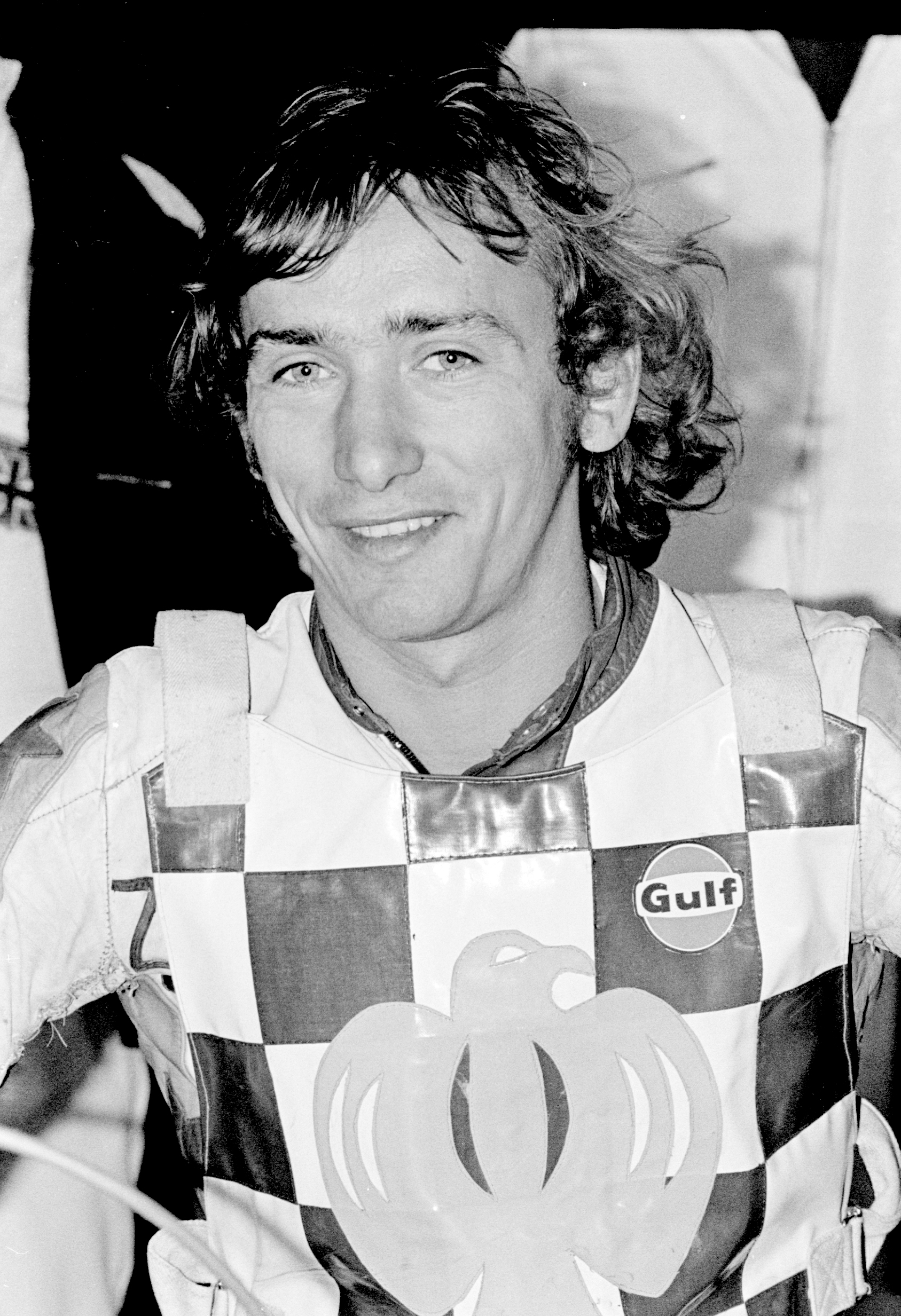
Zenon Plech in the Hackney Hawks team

The same positions filled Stal still for two next seasons. Season 1967 closed with the lack of the medal and the fourth place. A year later team again became a vice-champion of the country, and Edward Jancarz, making his debut in gameses for the individual world championships, captured the after the play-off race with the representative of USSR – Giennadij Kurylenko, bronze medal. 1969 was a huge success of Gorzów Wielkopolski speedway sport, then for the first time team from above of Warta became a Team Speedway Polish Champion. After the success in 1969 they counted on the defence of the title in the next season, unfortunately inhabitant of Stal finished gameses on the fifth place. The following year brought silver, already fifth as a matter of fact medal in the history of the club. From 1973 to 1979 inhabitant of team stood on the podium and won gold medals in years 1973, 1975 and of 1978 and silver in 1974 and of 1979. To the success of the entire team in 70 years Migoś in 1970, Zenon Plech in years 1972 and of 1974, Jancarz in 1975 and Bogusław Nowak in 1977 still got titles of individual Polish Individual Speedway Championship. Moreover, Plech in 1973 got second in the history of the club bronze medal of the individual world championships.

=== 1980s and 1990s ===
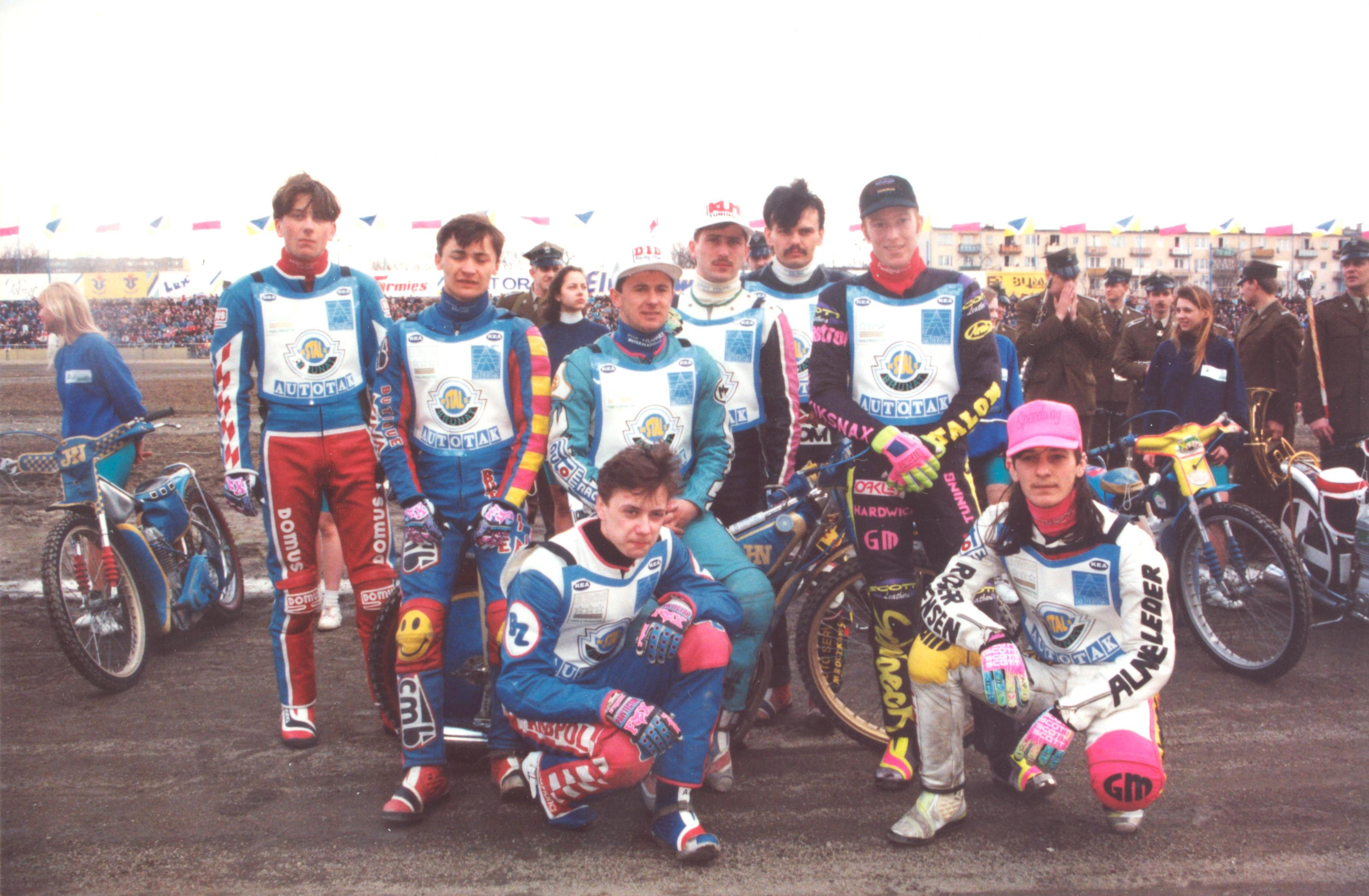
Stal in season 1994

In 1980 competitors of Stal took the fourth place then again of the year. In 1981 the team captured silver, in 1982 bronze, and in the season gained 1983 last up until now title of Team Speedway Polish Championship. A year later the club occupied only an eighth place. In the following years inhabitant of team went on average apart from year 1987, in which they got a bronze medal of the team Polish championship. Years brought two fourth places to 1990–1991. From the place on the podium both in 1990 as well as of 1991 only small points divided. In 1992 they were Stal with team vice-champions of Poland. Four consecutive seasons proceeded without most successes. The club got around the club in 1997 and on this occasion activists implemented changes being supposed to improve the performance of the squad. A changed name of the team of Stal stayed on Pergo and from Apator Toruń of Tomasz Bajerski was bought for the record-breaking 600.000 PLN. Also a contract with an individual world champion was signed from 1994 with Swede Tony Rickardsson. And after all the club in season 1997 gained a silver medal of the team Polish championship. After this season Piotr Świst resigned from the club, his walking away and a few smaller factors caused that in 1998 inhabitant of Gorzów Wielkopolski after the heavy fight had defended before the fall themselves. After making composition look younger in the next season the Stal occupied the sixth place, giving the right of the start in the season 2000 in reformed Speedway Ekstraliga. In the new season they captured team bronze medal of the team Polish championship, to after the fourth for place in 2001 to spend the worst season for forty years finished with the decline for the lower league competition.

=== 2003–2007. Race in 1.Liga ===
In 2003 Stal spite of great money troubles. When Świst and Mariusz Staszewski left the team in the club they put to young people. Juniors bolstered up with experienced competitors with Piotr Paluch, Robert Flis and the three of Swedes they proceeded up to the season with the intention supporting the team, into reality fought to the bitter end against the third place in the table. Charges of Stanisław Chomski are achieving 8 victories in the fundamental round, being promoted to a group of promotion-seek teams. Inhabitant of club after all are finishing the season on the fourth position. Similarly it was in the season 2004. Completely different moods accompanied speedway riders and activists before the season 2005. The purpose for the squad was clearly defined. An advance to the circle of teams was it Polish Speedway Ekstraliga. The team was strengthened with former individual world champion from 2000, with Mark Loram. The team finished the fundamental part of games on the top one spot. Unfortunately, they lost semi-final from the KM Ostrów Wielkopolski, that inhabitant of team to the match against the third place from RKM Rybnik they set about in domestic composition and after all from the row finished the third year games on the fourth position. The future of the club was questionable. The most gifted club junior, Paweł Hlib, left which he moved to the Unia Tarnów. On the day of 19 December 2005 a reporting-election annual general meeting, during which the new 6-person management board of a sports club was chosen was held Stal, at the head which Władysław Komarnicki was chosen. In the season 2006 applied to new regulations and for the first time in the history of Polish cinder a number of starting foreign competitors wasn't reduced. six competitors represented the club from outside Poland. Season 2007 it for of Stal special year. Before the start of games great achievements which were supposed to be crowning 750-years beats of the city were already being announced and 60-years of the club. To help with reaching at this target had Matej Ferjan contracting, Jesper B. Jensen and Magnus Zetterström. If later it turned out, the club after five years returned to the Speedway Ekstraliga. Except for very great achievement, that is winning through Stal the first divisions, the guard to mention the repair work which they moved at the Stadion Edwarda Jancarza. In the end fans could seat themselves in about of the entire path, because a missing part of the podium was built on.

=== 2008s and present ===
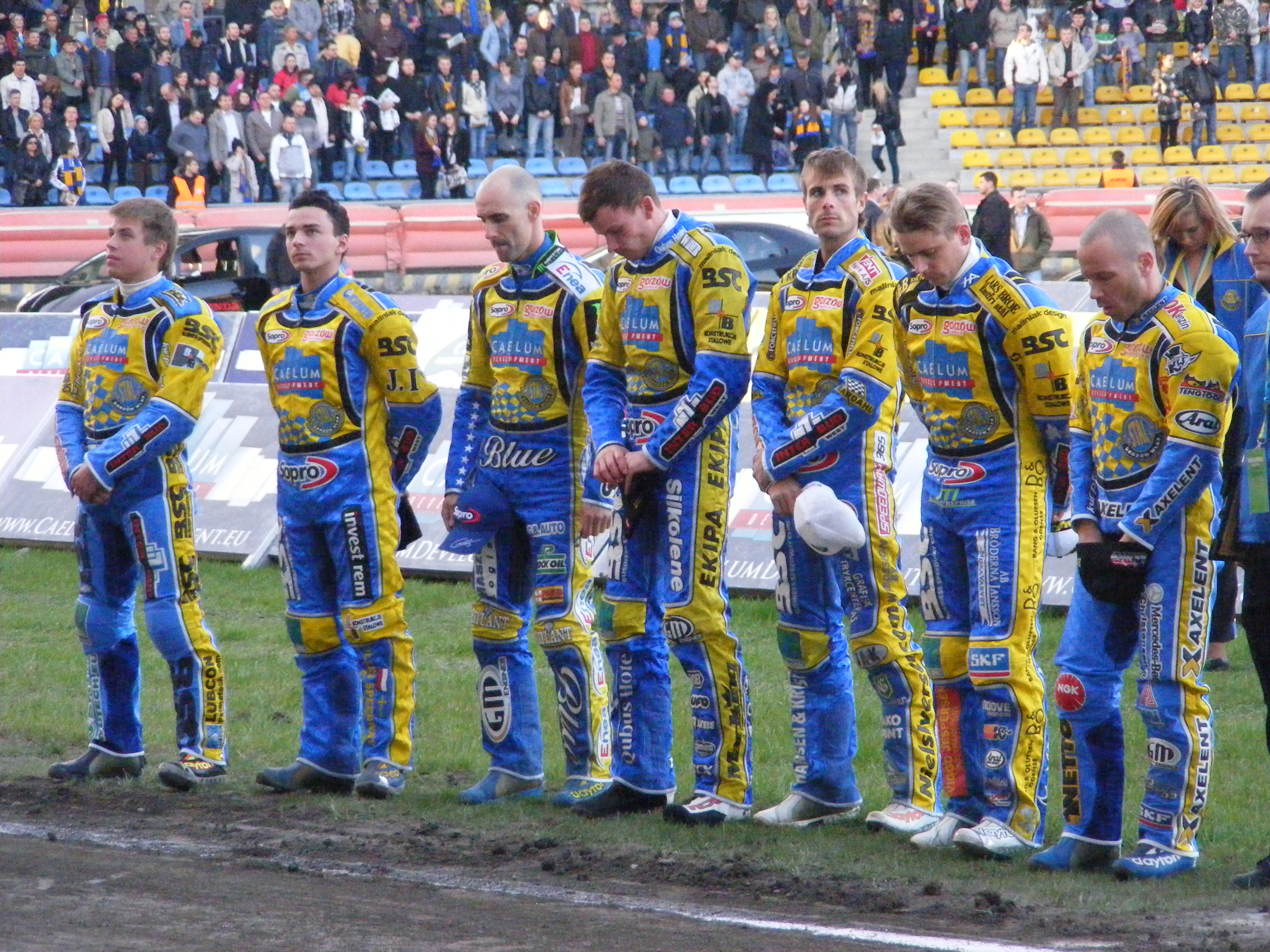
Stal in season 2011

After five years spent in the first division, fans with hope looked at the consecutive season. A company became a titular sponsor of the team Caelum Development and before the season 2008 was strengthened team. An outstanding Polish competitor of Tomasz Gollob was contracted, of Norwegian with the Polish passport Rune Holta and Swede – Peter Karlsson. Projects of the further expansion of the stadium were also described, of which openly a few days came before the inauguration of the season. Team finished gameses on the sixth place. Similarly it was in the consecutive season. Before the season a former individual world champion is attaching 2010 to the Stal Dane Nicki Pedersen and Tomasz Gapiński, and borrowed from the Unia Leszno – Przemysław Pawlicki. Team are finishing the fundamental round on the second place, but before play-off's from Falubaz of injury one of leaders of Stal – Pedersen and inhabitant of Gorzów Wielkopolski are losing match with the rival neighbouring and are taking the third time after all in gameses from the row the sixth place. In season 2010 a captain T. Gollob was a great success which got first in one's career and after 37 years – second for Poland – title of an individual world champion. Stal finished season 2011 after 11 years of the break fourth in the history of the club with bronze medal of the Team Speedway Polish Championship. In the season a representative of Poland is attaching 2012 to the Gorzów Wielkopolski team Krzysztof Kasprzak and the young Dane Michael J. Jensen. After 15 years are capturing Stal the vice-championship of the Team Speedway Polish Championship surrendering in final matches for gold for Azoty Unia Tarnów 93:86.

== Full season summary ==
Extended content

Year and league	League Position	Notes
1955 Second League	7th	
1956 Second League	2nd	
1957 Second League	5th	
1958 Second League	6th	
1959 Second League	3rd	
1960 Second League	4th	
1961 Second League	1st	Promotion
1962 First League	7th	
1963 First League	6th	
1964 First League	2nd	
1965 First League	2nd	
1966 First League	2nd	
1967 First League	5th	
1968 First League	2nd	
1969 First League	1st	Champions
1970 First League	5th	
1971 First League	2nd	
1972 First League	5th	
1973 First League	1st	Champions
1974 First League	2nd	
1975 First League	1st	Champions
1976 First League	1st	Champions
1977 First League	1st	Champions
1978 First League	1st	Champions
1979 First League	2nd	
1980 First League	4th	
1981 First League	2nd	
1982 First League	3rd	
1983 First League	1st	Champions
1984 First League	2nd	
1985 First League	8th	
1986 First League	5th	
1987 First League	3rd	
1988 First League	5th	
1989 First League	5th	
1990 First League	4th	
1991 First Division	4th	
1992 First Division	2nd	
1993 First Division	4th	
1994 First Division	4th	
1995 First Division	6th	
1996 First Division	4th	
1997 First Division	2nd	
1998 First Division	8th	
1999 First Division	6th	
2000 Ekstraliga	3rd	
2001 Ekstraliga	4th	
2002 Ekstraliga	8th	Relegation
2003 1.Liga	4th	
2004 1.Liga	4th	
2005 1.Liga	4th	
2006 1.Liga	4th	
2007 1.Liga	1st	Promotion
2008 Ekstraliga	6th	
2009 Ekstraliga	6th	
2010 Ekstraliga	6th	
2011 Ekstraliga	3rd	
2012 Ekstraliga	2nd	
2013 Ekstraliga	5th	
2014 Ekstraliga	1st	Champions
2015 Ekstraliga	6th	
2016 Ekstraliga	1st	Champions
2017 Ekstraliga	3rd	
2018 Ekstraliga	2nd	
2019 Ekstraliga	7th	
2020 Ekstraliga	2nd	
2021 Ekstraliga	3rd	
2022 Ekstraliga	2nd	
2023 Ekstraliga	5th	
2024 Ekstraliga	4th	
2025 Ekstraliga	7th	

== Notable riders ==
- (Australia) Jason Crump
- (Poland) Tomasz Gollob
- (United States) Billy Hamill
- (England) Gary Havelock
- (Denmark) Niels Kristian Iversen
- (Poland) Edward Jancarz
- (Denmark) Michael Jepsen Jensen
- (Sweden) Andreas Jonsson
- (Poland) Krzysztof Kasprzak
- (Hungary) Antal Kocso
- (England) Mark Loram
- (Poland) Edmund Migoś
- (Poland) Bogusław Nowak
- (Poland) Piotr Paluch
- (Denmark) Nicki Pedersen
- (Poland) Zenon Plech
- (Poland) Andrzej Pogorzelski
- (Poland) Jerzy Rembas
- (Sweden) Tony Rickardsson
- (Denmark) Anders Thomsen
- (Poland) Piotr Świst
- (Slovakia) Martin Vaculík
- (Poland) Bartosz Zmarzlik
- (Slovenia) Matej Žagar
