= 1960 Polish speedway season =

Motorcycle racing competition

The 1960 Polish Speedway season was the 1960 season of motorcycle speedway in Poland.

== Individual ==
=== Polish Individual Speedway Championship ===
The 1960 Individual Speedway Polish Championship was held on 28 August at Rybnik.

Pos.	Rider	Club	Total	Points
1	Konstanty Pociejkewicz	Wrocław	15	(3,3,3,3,3)
2	Marian Kaiser	Gdańsk	13+3	(2,3,3,2,3)
3	Bernard Kacperak	Częstochowa	13+2	(3,2,3,3,2)
4	Paweł Waloszek	Gdańsk	13+1	(3,2,2,3,3)
5	Joachim Maj	Rybnik	11	(1,3,1,3,3)
6	Jan Malinowski	Rzeszów	9	(3,2,0,2,2)
7	Bronisław Rogal	Gorzów Wlkp.	8	(2,3,2,1,d)
8	Kazimierz Bentke	Leszno	6	(0,1,3,1,1)
9	Stanisław Rurarz	Częstochowa	6	(1,1,2,u,2)
10	Roman Gąsior	Krosno	5	(0,2,2,0,1)
11	Wiesław Rutkowski	Piła	5	(1,1,0,1,2)
12	Edward Kupczyński	Bydgoszcz	4	(1,0,1,2,0)
13	Janusz Kościelak	Rzeszów	3	(2,0,1,u,0)
14	Norbert Świtała	Bydgoszcz	3	(0,d,d,2,1)
15	Rajmund Świtała	Bydgoszcz	2	(2,0)
16	Stanisław Kaiser	Gdańsk	2	(0,1,1,d,d)
17	Bronisław Idzikowski (res)	Częstochowa	1	(0,1)
18	Marian Philipp (res)	Rybnik		(ns)
19	Stefan Kwoczała (res)	Częstochowa		(ns)
20	Stefan Kępa (res)	Rzeszów		(ns)

=== Criterium of Aces ===
The Criterium of Aces was won by Marian Rose.

== Team ==
=== Team Speedway Polish Championship ===
The 1960 Team Speedway Polish Championship was the 13th edition of the Team Polish Championship. Stal Rzeszów won the gold medal.

==== First League ====
Pos	Club	Pts	W	D	L	+/−
1	Stal Rzeszów	24	12	0	2	+176
2	Legia Gdańsk	19	9	1	4	+143
3	Polonia Bydgoszcz	18	8	2	4	+114
4	Włókniarz Częstochowa	17	8	1	5	+115
5	Górnik Rybnik	12	6	0	8	–27
6	Unia Leszno	12	6	0	8	–66
7	Unia Tarnów	10	5	0	9	–128
8	Start Gniezno	0	0	0	14	–327

==== Second League (East) ====
Pos	Club	Pts	W	D	L	+/−
1	Wanda Nowa Huta	14	7	0	2	+30
2	Tramwajarz Łódź	12	6	0	3	+107
3	Legia Krosno	11	5	1	3	+100
4	Śląsk Świętochłowice	10	5	0	4	+119
5	Cracovia Kraków	3	1	1	7	–106
6	CKS Czeladź	not classified				

==== Second League (West) ====
Pos	Club	Pts	W	D	L	+/−
1	Sparta Wrocław	18	9	0	1	+186
2	Stal Gorzów Wielkopolski	16	8	0	2	+150
3	Polonia Piła	10	5	0	5	–4
4	LPŻ Zielona Góra	6	3	0	7	–81
5	Sparta Śrem	6	3	0	7	–104
6	LPŻ Toruń	4	2	0	8	–147

Play off

- Sparta Wrocław v Wanda Nowa Huta 46–32, 49-29
