= 1952 Polish speedway season =

Motorcycle racing competition

The 1952 Polish Speedway season was the 1952 season of motorcycle speedway in Poland.

== Individual ==
=== Polish Individual Speedway Championship ===
The 1952 Individual Speedway Polish Championship was held in Wrocław on 17 August 1952.

Pos.	Rider	Club	Points	Total
1	Edward Kupczyński	Wrocław	14	(3,2,3,3,3)
2	Tadeusz Fijałkowski	Warszawa	13	(3,3,2,2,3)
3	Janusz Suchecki	Wrocław	12	(2,2,3,2,3)
4	Stanisław Glapiak	Leszno	11	(3,1,3,3,1)
5	Bolesław Bonin	Bydgoszcz	10	(u,3,3,2,2)
6	Włodzimierz Szwendrowski	Łódź	9	(u,3,0,3,3)
7	Mieczysław Kosierb	Wrocław	8	(2,3,2,1,wu)
8	Zbigniew Raniszewski	Bydgoszcz	7	(1,wu,3,2,1)
9	Paweł Dziura	Rybnik	5	(3,0,1,1,d)
10	Jan Krakowiak	Wrocław	5	(1,2,2,0,0)
11	Józef Olejniczak	Leszno	4	(d,u,ns,2,2)
12	Marian Kaznowski	Częstochowa	4	(2,0,1,1,wu)
13	Joachim Maj	Rybnik	4	(u,1,1,wu,2)
14	Roman Wielgosz	Ostrów Wlkp.	4	(0,2,1,d,1)
15	Bolesław Puper	Łódź	3	(2,1,0,0,0)
16	Henryk Ignasiak	Rawicz	3	(1,1,0,1,0)

=== Criterium of Aces ===
The Criterium of Aces was won by Bolesław Bonin.

== Team ==
=== Team Speedway Polish Championship ===
The 1952 Team Speedway Polish Championship was the fifth edition of the Team Polish Championship.

Rules In First League, matches were played with part two teams, without it playing it matches return. Teams consisted of 6 drivers plus 2 reserves. The score of heat: 3–2–1–0. Mecz consisted with 9 heats. For winning game team received 2 points, lost – 0 points. The drivers from the main squad started in a match three times. The quantity of small points was added up.

Before the season it was established that only 4 full rounds would take place with the 5th round consisting of only the first 8 teams. After playing 5 rounds the first 4 teams played a "Play-Off" (Semi-Final and Final).

Ogniwo Bytom was moved to Łódź, and CWKS from Warszawa to Wrocław.

==== First League ====
Pos	Team	Match	Points	Won	Lost	+/-
1	Unia Leszno	5	10	5	0	+68
2	CWKS Wrocław	5	10	5	0	+68
3	Spójnia Wrocław	5	8	4	0	+63
4	Gwardia Bydgoszcz	5	6	3	2	+28
5	Ogniwo Łódź	5	6	3	2	+1
6	Górnik Rybnik	5	4	2	3	+8
7	Stal Ostrów Wielkopolski	5	2	1	4	−47
8	Włókniarz Częstochowa	5	2	1	0	−72
9	Kolejarz Rawicz	4	0	0	4	−31
10	Budowlani Warszawa	4	0	0	4	−86

Play-Offs

Semi-Finals in Wrocław (3 August)

- Unia Leszno – Spójnia Wrocław 29:23
- CWKS Wrocław – Gwardia Bydgoszcz 33:17

Third place in Łódź (10 August)

- Spójnia Wrocław – Gwardia Bydgoszcz 45:00 (wo)

Final in Rybnik (10 August)

- Unia Leszno – CWKS Wrocław 35:19

Medalists

Unia Leszno	Józef Olejniczak, Stanisław Glapiak, Marian Kuśnierek, Kazimierz Bentke, Henryk Woźniak, Mieczysław Cichocki, Władysław Okoniewski, Marian Kwarciński, Stanisław Przybylski, Stanisław Kowalski, Teodor Pogorzelski
CWKS Wrocław	Jan Krakowiak, Eugeniusz Wróżyński, Janusz Suchecki, Władysław Orwat, Witold Kołeczek, Zdzisław Smoczyk, Jan Kwaśniewski, Białkowski, Mieczysław Połukard
Spójnia Wrocław	Edward Kupczyński, Mieczysław Kosierb, Tadeusz Teodorowicz, Jerzy Sałabun, Albin Tomczyszyn, Adolf Słaboń
