= Jaskółcze Gniazdo Municipal Stadium =

Stadium in Tarnów, Poland

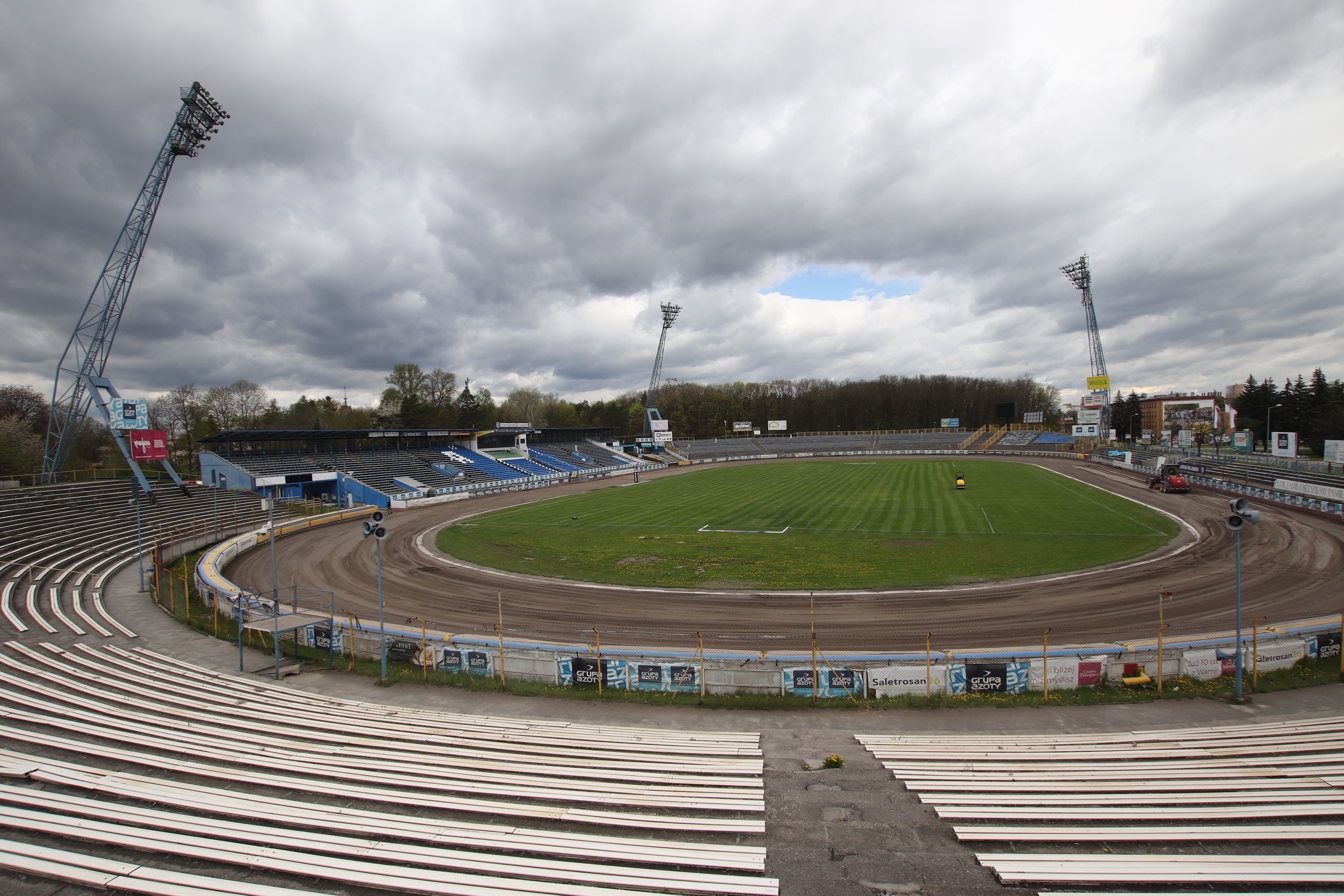
- The stadium in 2021
- Location: 33-110, Zbylitowska 3, 33-100 Tarnów, Poland
- Coordinates: 50°00′31″N 20°55′30″E
- Capacity: 16,000
- Owner: Tarnów City Hall
- Opened: 1972
- Length: 0.392 km (0.244 mi)

The Jaskółcze Gniazdo Municipal Stadium or The Swallow's Nest (Polish: Stadion Miejski w Tarnowie) is a 16,000-capacity motorcycle speedway and association football stadium in the western outskirts of Tarnów, Poland.

The venue is used by the speedway team Unia Tarnów, who compete in the Team Speedway Polish Championship and the Unia Tarnów football team. The pitch measures 104 x 68 metres.

== History ==
The record attendance was set on 26 September 2004, when 25,000 spectators attended the speedway match between Unia Tarnów and Atlas Wrocław. Later that year on 30 December, the facility was renamed the Municipal Stadium.

In 2011, the stadium added the prefix Jaskółcze Gniazdo (the Swallow's Nest).
