= Andrzej Jurczyński =

Polish speedway rider

- Born: 10 November 1950 (age 76); Częstochowa, Poland
- Nationality: Polish

Career history

Poland
- 1969-1986: Częstochowa

Great Britain
- 1978: White City Rebels

Team honours
- 1974: Speedway World Team Cup bronze medal
- 1974: Polish League Champion

Andrzej Jurczyński (born 10 November 1950) is a former international speedway rider from Poland. He earned 24 international caps for the Poland national speedway team.

== Speedway career ==
Jurczyński won a bronze medal at the Speedway World Team Cup in the 1974 Speedway World Team Cup.

Jurczyński rode in the British leagues after signing for White City Rebels for the 1978 season.

== World final appearances ==
=== World Team Cup ===
- 1974 - (Poland) Chorzów, Silesian Stadium (with Zenon Plech / Jan Mucha / Andrzej Tkocz / Jerzy Szczakiel) - 3rd - 13pt (3)
