= Team Speedway Polish Championship =

Polish motorcycle speedway competition

Polish League Championship Ekstraliga
- Sport: Speedway
- Founded: 1948
- Country: Poland, Germany, Latvia in past also: Ukraine, Czech Republic, Hungary
- Most recent champion: KS Toruń (2026)
- Website: Official site

The Team Speedway Polish Championship (Polish: Drużynowe Mistrzostwa Polski, DMP) is an annual speedway event held each year in different Polish clubs organized by the Polish Motor Union (PZM) since 1948. In 2000, the First Division was renamed Ekstraliga, and the number of teams was reduced.

The team winning the league is awarded a gold medal and declared Polish Team Champions. Teams finishing second and third are awarded silver and bronze medals respectively.

== Previous winners ==
Year	Winners	2nd place	3rd place
1948	PKM Warsaw	LKM Leszno	Olimpia Grudziądz
1949	LKM Leszno	tied KM Ostrów Wielkopolski; Skra-Związkowiec	None
1950	Unia Leszno	Budowlani Rybnik	KM Ostrów Wielkopolski
1951	Unia Leszno	Polonia Bydgoszcz	Górnik Rybnik
1952	Unia Leszno	CWKS Wrocław	Spójnia Wrocław
1953	Unia Leszno	Polonia Bydgoszcz	Spójnia Wrocław
1954	Unia Leszno	Spójnia Wrocław	Kolejarz Rawicz
1955	Gwardia Bydgoszcz	Kolejarz Rawicz	WTS Sparta Wrocław
1956	Górnik Rybnik	Ślęza Wrocław	Polonia Bydgoszcz
1957	Górnik Rybnik	WTS Sparta Wrocław	Polonia Bydgoszcz
1958	Górnik Rybnik	WTS Sparta Wrocław	Unia Leszno
1959	Włókniarz Częstochowa	Górnik Rybnik	Legia Warsaw
1960	Stal Rzeszów	Legia Gdańsk	Polonia Bydgoszcz
1961	Stal Rzeszów	Górnik Rybnik	Polonia Bydgoszcz
1962	Górnik Rybnik	Stal Rzeszów	Unia Leszno
1963	Górnik Rybnik	Stal Rzeszów	WTS Sparta Wrocław
1964	Górnik Rybnik	Stal Gorzów Wielkopolski	Polonia Bydgoszcz
1965	ROW Rybnik	Stal Gorzów Wielkopolski	Wybrzeże Gdańsk
1966	ROW Rybnik	Stal Gorzów Wielkopolski	Stal Rzeszów
1967	ROW Rybnik	Wybrzeże Gdańsk	WTS Sparta Wrocław
1968	ROW Rybnik	Stal Gorzów Wielkopolski	WTS Sparta Wrocław
1969	Stal Gorzów Wielkopolski	Śląsk Świętochłowice	ROW Rybnik
1970	ROW Rybnik	Śląsk Świętochłowice	Kolejarz Opole
1971	Polonia Bydgoszcz	Stal Gorzów Wielkopolski	ROW Rybnik
1972	ROW Rybnik	Polonia Bydgoszcz	Śląsk Świętochłowice
1973	Stal Gorzów Wielkopolski	Śląsk Świętochłowice	Falubaz Zielona Góra
1974	Włókniarz Częstochowa	Stal Gorzów Wielkopolski	ROW Rybnik
1975	Stal Gorzów Wielkopolski	Włókniarz Częstochowa	Unia Leszno
1976	Stal Gorzów Wielkopolski	Włókniarz Częstochowa	Unia Leszno
1977	Stal Gorzów Wielkopolski	Unia Leszno	Włókniarz Częstochowa
1978	Stal Gorzów Wielkopolski	Wybrzeże Gdańsk	Włókniarz Częstochowa
1979	Unia Leszno	Stal Gorzów Wielkopolski	Falubaz Zielona Góra
1980	Unia Leszno	ROW Rybnik	Start Gniezno
1981	Falubaz Zielona Góra	Stal Gorzów Wielkopolski	Unia Leszno
1982	Falubaz Zielona Góra	Unia Leszno	Stal Gorzów Wielkopolski
1983	Stal Gorzów Wielkopolski	Unia Leszno	Apator Toruń
1984	None	Stal Gorzów Wielkopolski	Falubaz Zielona Góra
1985	Falubaz Zielona Góra	Wybrzeże Gdańsk	Unia Leszno
1986	Apator Toruń	Polonia Bydgoszcz	Unia Leszno
1987	Unia Leszno	Polonia Bydgoszcz	Stal Gorzów Wielkopolski
1988	Unia Leszno	ROW Rybnik	Polonia Bydgoszcz
1989	Unia Leszno	Falubaz Zielona Góra	ROW Rybnik
1990	Apator Toruń	ROW Rybnik	Polonia Bydgoszcz
1991	Morawski Zielona Góra	Motor Lublin	Apator Toruń
1992	Polonia Bydgoszcz	Stal Gorzów Wielkopolski	Apator Toruń
1993	WTS Sparta Wrocław	Polonia Bydgoszcz	Apator Toruń
1994	WTS Sparta Wrocław	Unia Tarnów	Apator Toruń
1995	WTS Sparta Wrocław	Apator Toruń	Polonia Bydgoszcz
1996	Włókniarz Częstochowa	Apator Toruń	Polonia Piła
1997	Polonia Bydgoszcz	Stal Gorzów Wielkopolski	Polonia Piła
1998	Polonia Bydgoszcz	Polonia Piła	Van Pur Rzeszów
1999	Polonia Piła	Atlas Wrocław	Wybrzeże Gdańsk
Known as the Ekstraliga from 2000
2000	Polonia Bydgoszcz	Polonia Piła	Stal Gorzów Wielkopolski
2001	Apator Toruń	Sparta Wrocław	Polonia Bydgoszcz
2002	Polonia Bydgoszcz	Unia Leszno	Sparta Wrocław
2003	Włókniarz Częstochowa	Apator Toruń	Polonia Bydgoszcz
2004	Unia Tarnów	Sparta Wrocław	Włókniarz Częstochowa
2005	Unia Tarnów	Polonia Bydgoszcz	Włókniarz Częstochowa
2006	Sparta Wrocław	Włókniarz Częstochowa	Polonia Bydgoszcz
2007	Unia Leszno	Unibax Toruń	Sparta Wrocław
2008	Unibax Toruń	Unia Leszno	ZKŻ Zielona Góra
2009	Falubaz Zielona Góra	Unibax Toruń	Włókniarz Częstochowa
2010	Unia Leszno	Falubaz Zielona Góra	Unibax Toruń
2011	Falubaz Zielona Góra	Unia Leszno	Stal Gorzów Wielkopolski
2012	Unia Tarnów	Stal Gorzów Wielkopolski	Unibax Toruń
2013	Falubaz Zielona Góra	Unibax Toruń	Unia Tarnów
2014	Stal Gorzów Wielkopolski	Unia Leszno	Unia Tarnów
2015	Unia Leszno	Sparta Wrocław	Unia Tarnów
2016	Stal Gorzów Wielkopolski	KS Toruń	Falubaz Zielona Góra
2017	Unia Leszno	Sparta Wrocław	Stal Gorzów Wielkopolski
2018	Unia Leszno	Stal Gorzów Wielkopolski	Sparta Wrocław
2019	Unia Leszno	Sparta Wrocław	Włókniarz Częstochowa
2020	Unia Leszno	Stal Gorzów Wielkopolski	Sparta Wrocław
2021	Sparta Wrocław	Motor Lublin	Stal Gorzów Wielkopolski
2022	Motor Lublin	Stal Gorzów Wielkopolski	Włókniarz Częstochowa
2023	Motor Lublin	Sparta Wrocław	KS Toruń
2024	Motor Lublin	Sparta Wrocław	KS Toruń
2025	KS Toruń	Motor Lublin	Sparta Wrocław
2026	KS Toruń	Sparta Wrocław	Motor Lublin

== Titles by club ==
Bold indicates clubs currently playing in the top division.
Italics indicates defunct clubs.

Club	Champions	Winning years
**Unia Leszno**	18	1949, 1950, 1951, 1952, 1953, 1954, 1979, 1980, 1987, 1988, 1989, 2007, 2010, 2015, 2017, 2018, 2019, 2020
ROW Rybnik	12	1956, 1957, 1958, 1962, 1963, 1964, 1965, 1966, 1967, 1968, 1970, 1972
**Stal Gorzów Wielkopolski**	9	1969, 1973, 1975, 1976, 1977, 1978, 1983, 2014, 2016
**Polonia Bydgoszcz**	7	1955, 1971, 1992, 1997, 1998, 2000, 2002
**Falubaz Zielona Góra**	7	1981, 1982, 1985, 1991, 2009, 2011, 2013
**KS Toruń**	6	1986, 1990, 2001, 2008, 2025, 2026
**Sparta Wrocław**	5	1993, 1994, 1995, 2006, 2021
Włókniarz Częstochowa	4	1959, 1974, 1996, 2003
Unia Tarnów	3	2004, 2005, 2012
**Speedway Lublin**	3	2022, 2023, 2024
Stal Rzeszów	2	1960, 1961
PKM Warsaw	1	1948
Polonia Piła	1	1999

== See also ==
- Polish Speedway First League
- Polish Speedway Second League
