= WTS Sparta Wrocław =

Polish motorcycle speedway team

Club information
- Track address: Olympic Stadium; Wrocław
- Country: Poland
- Founded: 1950 (as WTS since 1992)
- Team manager: Piotr Protasiewicz
- Team captain: Maciej Janowski
- League: Ekstraliga
- Website: Official Website

Club facts
- Colours: Yellow and Red
- Nickname: WTS; Sparta
- Track size: 352 metres (385 yd)
- Track record time: 60.06 seconds
- Track record date: 16 August 2020
- Track record holder: Tai Woffinden

Major team honours
Team Polish Champions	1993, 1994, 1995, 2006, 2021
Pair Polish Champion	2001, 2011, 2016, 2018
Individual Polish Champion	1952, 1954, 1960, 2012, 2015, 2017, 2020, 2024

WTS Sparta Wrocław, also known as Betard Sparta Wrocław for sponsorship reasons, are a motorcycle speedway team based in Wrocław, Poland. They were established in 1950. The team's home track is at the Olympic Stadium, which has a capacity of 13,675 people. The team currently competes in the Ekstraliga (the highest division) and have won the Team Speedway Polish Championship five times (as of 2025).

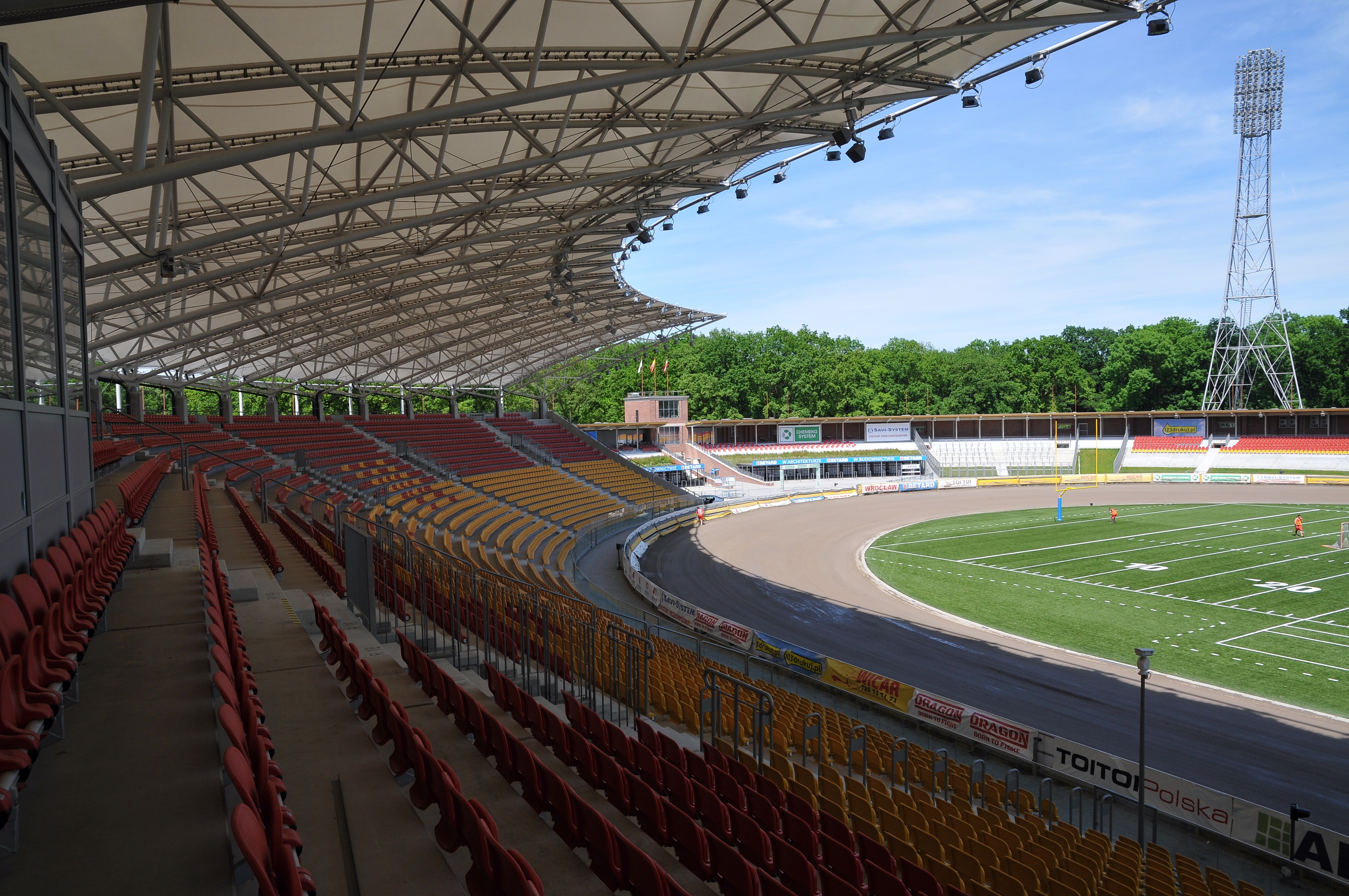
Stadion Olimpijski, home venue of Sparta Wrocław

== History ==
=== 1951 to 1958 ===
During the 1951 Polish speedway season a team from Wrocław called Spójnia Wrocław was created to compete in the first league. The team finished last but performed much better in 1952, finishing 2nd. A second club competed in Wrocław during the early 1950s but CWKS Wrocław was historically a Warsaw club and is not connected to this club.

Edward Kupczyński was the club's first star rider winning the 1952 Polish Individual Speedway Championship and the team won honours during the next seven consecutive years, winning silver and bronze medals in the Team Speedway Polish Championship from 1952 to 1958. The club also became known as Sparta Wrocław, with the exception of 1957 when the club competed as Ślęza Wrocław. Mieczysław Połukard became Polish champion in 1954.

=== 1959 to 1992 ===
After relegation in 1959 the team gained promotion back to the highest division after winning the Second League (West) in 1960. During the next three decades success became sparse with only three bronze medals won in 1963, 1967 and 1968 respectively. The team were renamed WTS (Wrocławskie Towarzystwo Sportowe) in 1992.

=== 1993 to 1995 ===
During the 1993 Polish speedway season the club won the gold medal for the first time in their history. The team's averages improved significantly on 1992 and Tommy Knudsen, Dariusz Śledź, Piotr Baron and Wojciech Załuski were instrumental in helping win the league. The same team repeated the feat to win the gold medal in 1994 and 1995, with only Piotr Protasiewicz coming in during 1995.

=== 1996 to 2014 ===
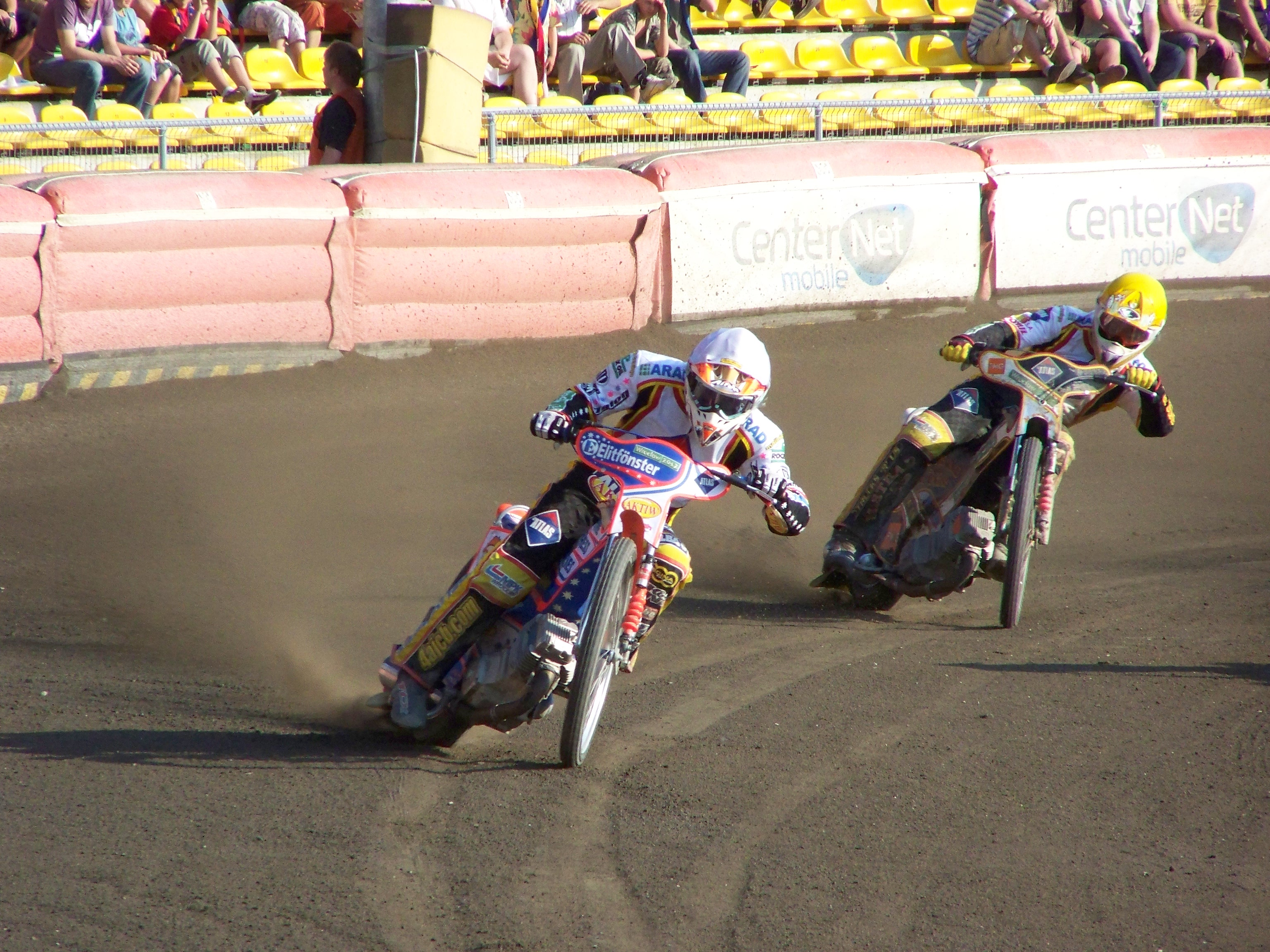
Jason Crump leads a race for Wrocław in 2009

After a silver medal in 1999, Wrocław became inaugural members of the Ekstraliga in 2000. In 2006, the club won their fourth gold medal with a team led by Australian world champion Jason Crump. In 2012, the club signed Tai Woffinden.

=== 2015 to present ===
From 2015 the club remain one of the leading clubs in Poland, challenging on all fronts and have won three more Polish Pairs Speedway Championships, during the 2011 Polish speedway season, 2016 Polish speedway season and 2018 Polish speedway season. The club won a fifth gold medal during the 2021 Polish speedway season, with riders including Maciej Janowski, Artem Laguta, Tai Woffinden, Dan Bewley and Gleb Chugunov.

== Previous teams ==
Extended content

2022 team

- (England) Tai Woffinden
- (Poland) Maciej Janowski
- (England) Dan Bewley
- (Russia) / (Poland) Gleb Chugunov
- (Germany) Lukas Baumann
- (Poland) Michał Curzytek
- (Poland) Bartłomiej Kowalski
- (Poland) Mateusz Panicz
- (Germany) Sandro Wassermann
- (Slovenia) Nick Škorja
- (England) Jack Smith
- (Poland) Jakub Wiatrowski
- (Poland) Dawid Rybak
- (Czech Republic) Jaroslav Vanicek

2023 team

- (England) Tai Woffinden
- (Russia) / (Poland) Artem Laguta
- (Poland) Maciej Janowski
- (England) Dan Bewley
- (Poland) Piotr Pawlicki Jr.
- (Latvia) Francis Gusts
- (Poland) Mateusz Panicz
- (Poland) Bartłomiej Kowalski

== Notable riders ==
- (Poland) Piotr Baron
- (Australia) Jason Crump
- (Poland) Jarosław Hampel
- (Poland) Maciej Janowski
- (Poland) Tomasz Jędrzejak
- (Denmark) Tommy Knudsen
- (Poland) Jacek Krzyżaniak
- (Poland) Edward Kupczyński
- (Poland) Konstanty Pociejkewicz
- (Poland) Mieczysław Połukard
- (Poland) Dariusz Śledź
- (Poland) Tadeusz Teodorowicz
- (England) Tai Woffinden
- (Poland) Szymon Woźniak
- (Poland) Wojciech Załuski

== Honours ==
Competitions	Total	Golden medals		Silver medals		Bronze medals
Competitions	Total	Total	Years	Total	Years	Total	Years
Team (DMP) (since 1948)	29	5	1993, 1994, 1995, 2006, 2021	13	1954, 1956, 1957, 1958, 1999, 2001, 2004, 2015, 2017, 2019, 2023, 2024, 2026	11	1952, 1953, 1955, 1963, 1967, 1968, 2002, 2007, 2018, 2020, 2025
Team U-21 (MDMP) (since 1978)	2	0		0		2	1992, 1993
Pairs (MPPK) (since 1974)	7	1	2001	4	1975, 1976, 1995, 2007	2	1978, 1999
Pairs U-21 (MMPPK) (1980 U-23; since 1983)	3	0		1	2001	2	1998, 2006
Individual (IMP) (since 1948)	18	3	1952, 1954, 1960	4	1956, 1958, 2001, 2004	11	1954, 1957, 1969, 1974, 1978, 1979, 1999, 2000, 2001, 2002, 2003
Individual U-21 (MIMP) (since 1967)	4	2	2002, 2008	2	1995, 2001	0
Total Polish Championship medals: 63		Gold: 11		Silver: 24		Bronze: 28
Competitions	Total	I place		II place		III place
Competitions	Total	Total	Years	Total	Years	Total	Years
European Club (KPE) (since 1998)	1	0		1	2007	0
Team Cup (DPP) (?)	6	1	1995	1	1993	4	1996, 1997, 1998, 1999
Golden Helmet (ZK) (since 1961)	11	4	1979, 1980, 1993, 1999	4	1994, 2001, 2003, 2004	3	2001, 2003, 2005
Silver Helmet U-21 (SK) (since 1966)	8	3	1968, 1994, 2008	4	1996, 1999, 2000, 2006	1	1972
Bronze Helmet U-19 (BK) (1976-81; since 1983)	5	1	1993	3	1991, 1992, 2008	1	1979
