= Unia Leszno =

Polish motorcycle speedway team

Club information
- Track address: Stadion Alfreda Smoczyka; Leszno
- Country: Poland
- Founded: 8 May 1938
- Team manager: Rafał Okoniewski
- League: Ekstraliga
- Website: Official Website

Club facts
- Colours: White and Blue
- Nickname: Byki (Bulls)
- Track size: 346 metres (378 yd)
- Track record time: 60.27 seconds
- Track record date: 22 May 2022
- Track record holder: Janusz Kołodziej

Major team honours
Team Polish Champions x 18	1949, 1950, 1951, 1952, 1953, 1954, 1979, 1980, 1987, 1988, 1989, 2007, 2010, 2015, 2017, 2018, 2019, 2020
Pair Polish Champion	10 times (most recent 2020)
Individual Polish Champion	13 times (most recent 2019)

Unia Leszno are a motorcycle speedway team established on 8 May 1938 and based in Leszno, Poland. The team's home track is at the Stadion Alfreda Smoczyka. They compete in the Ekstraliga (the highest division) and are Poland's most accomplished team, winning 18 Team Speedway Polish Championships (as of 2022).

== History ==
=== 1949 to 1962 ===
The club competed in the inaugural 1948 Polish speedway season, under the name of LKM Leszno and won the silver medal. The following year they captured the gold medal during the 1949 Polish speedway season and Leszno rider Alfred Smoczyk won the Polish Individual Speedway Championship. The team dominated the Championship during the following period and won six successive league titles from 1949 to 1954. The club later won bronze medals in 1958 and 1962.

=== 1963 to 1978 ===
The 1960s were a much quieter time for the club as Rybnik dominated Polish speedway. Although Henryk Żyto won the 1963 Polish Individual Speedway Championship, the club were relegated in 1964. They won the Polish Speedway First League in 1966 but failed to gain promotion based on the two year system at the time. They finally gained promotion in 1972 and began to compete again by the mid-70s. The team contained riders such as Zdzisław Dobrucki and Bernard Jąder who would win three Polish titles between them. Two bronze medals in 1975 and 1976 and one silver medal in 1977 ensued.

=== 1979 to 1990 ===
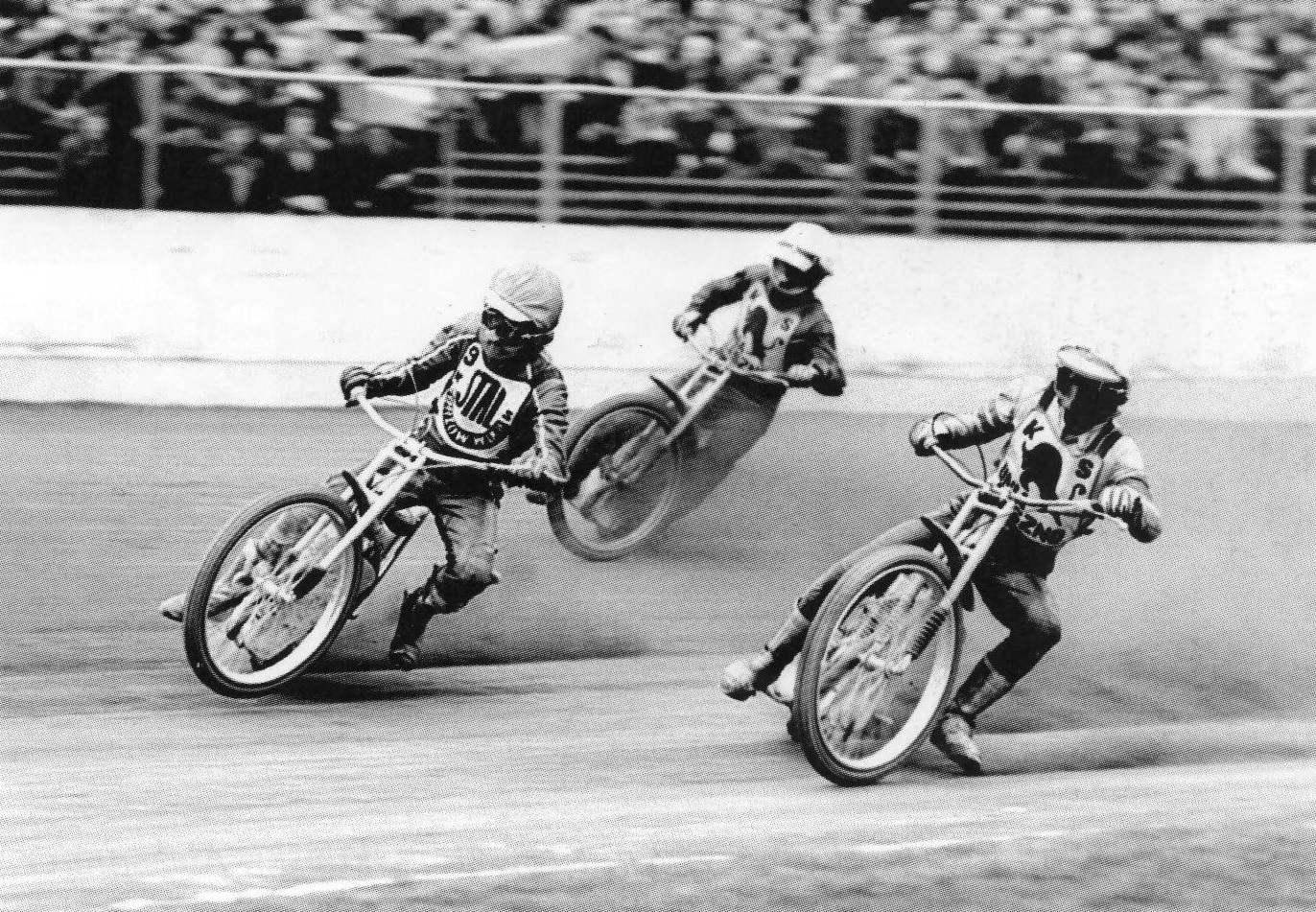
1981, Ryszard Buskiewicz and Roman Jankowski of Leszno trail Jerzy Rembas of Gorzów

1979 to 1990 was a golden period for the club as they won five Polish championship gold medals, two silvers and one bronze. In addition they won the Polish Pairs Speedway Championship five times in 1980, 1984, 1987, 1988 and 1989 and Roman Jankowski was twice Polish champion and Zenon Kasprzak was champion in 1990.

=== 1991 to 2001 ===
In contrast to earlier success, the club spent 11 years struggling, with the exception of winning the second division in 1996. They were however inaugural members of the Ekstraliga in 2000.

=== 2002 to present ===
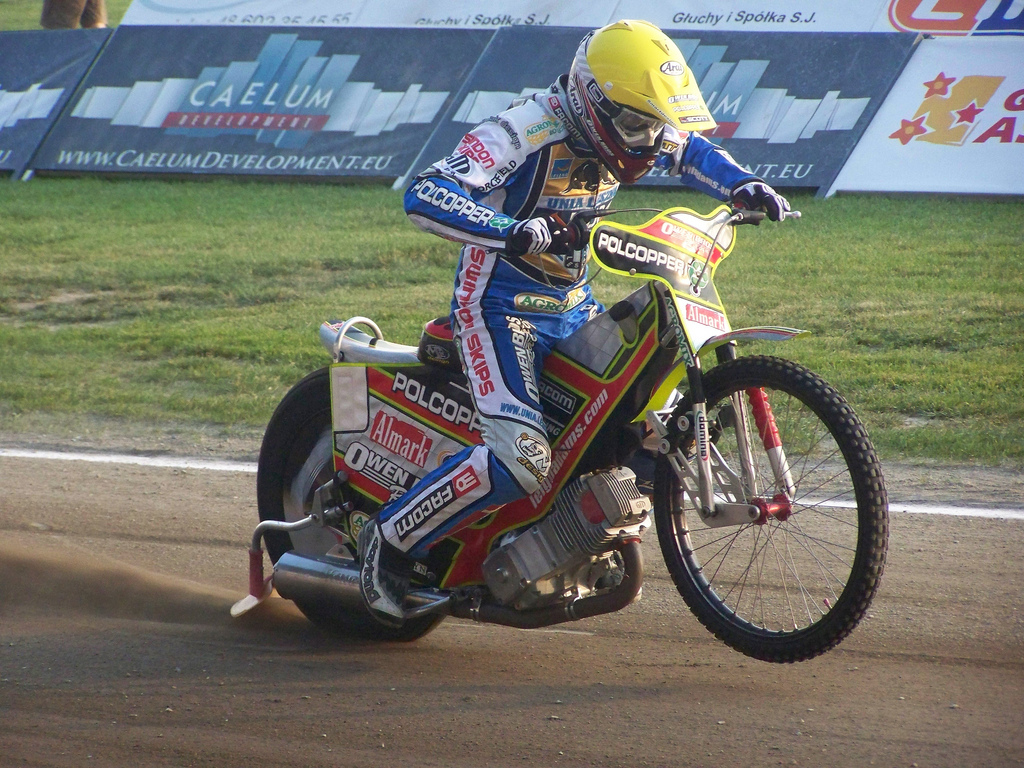
Leigh Adams, rode for Unia from 1996 to 2010

In 2002, a return to form saw the team win the silver medal and Unia became one of the leading teams in Polish speedway for the next two decades, matching the 1980s achievements. They have won ten medals, including seven gold's in 2007, 2010, 2015, 2017, 2018, 2019 and 2020. Five more Polish Pairs championships were added and riders such as Janusz Kołodziej, Jarosław Hampel and Piotr Pawlicki Jr. have all become Polish champions. Foreign riders such as Leigh Adams, Nicki Pedersen and Emil Saifutdinov have been integral in their gold medal wins in recent years.

== Previous teams ==
Extended content

2022 team

- (Poland) Janusz Kolodziej
- (Poland) Piotr Pawlicki
- (Australia) Jason Doyle
- (France) David Bellego
- (Australia) Jaimon Lidsey
- (Denmark) Jesper Knudsen
- (Denmark) Jonas Kundsen
- (Australia) James Pearson
- (Australia) Keynan Rew
- (Poland) Hubert Scibak
- (Poland) Damian Ratajczak
- (Poland) Maksym Borowiak
- (Poland) Antoni Mencel
- (Poland) Hubert Jablonski

2023 team

- (Australia) Chris Holder
- (Poland) Janusz Kolodziej
- (Poland) Bartosz Smektała
- (Australia) Jaimon Lidsey
- (Poland) Grzegorz Zengota
- (Poland) Damian Ratajczak
- (Poland) Maksym Borowiak
- (Poland) Antoni Mencel
- (Poland) Hubert Jablonski
- (Australia) James Pearson
- (Poland) Tobias Musielak
- (Poland) Jakub Oleksiak
- (Poland) Nazar Parnitskyi
- (Australia) Maurice Brown

== Notable riders ==
- (Australia) Leigh Adams
- (Poland) Damian Baliński
- (Poland) Zdzisław Dobrucki
- (Poland) Jarosław Hampel
- (Poland) Bernard Jąder
- (Poland) Roman Jankowski
- (Poland) Zenon Kasprzak
- (Poland) Janusz Kołodziej
- (Poland) Zbigniew Krakowski
- (Poland) Jan Krzystyniak
- (Poland) Dominik Kubera
- (Poland) Mariusz Okoniewski
- (Poland) Józef Olejniczak
- (Poland) Piotr Pawlicki Jr.
- (Poland) Przemysław Pawlicki
- (Denmark) Nicki Pedersen
- (Russia) Emil Saifutdinov
- (Poland) Bartosz Smektała
- (Poland) Alfred Smoczyk
- (Poland) Grzegorz Zengota
- (Poland) Henryk Żyto

== Honours ==
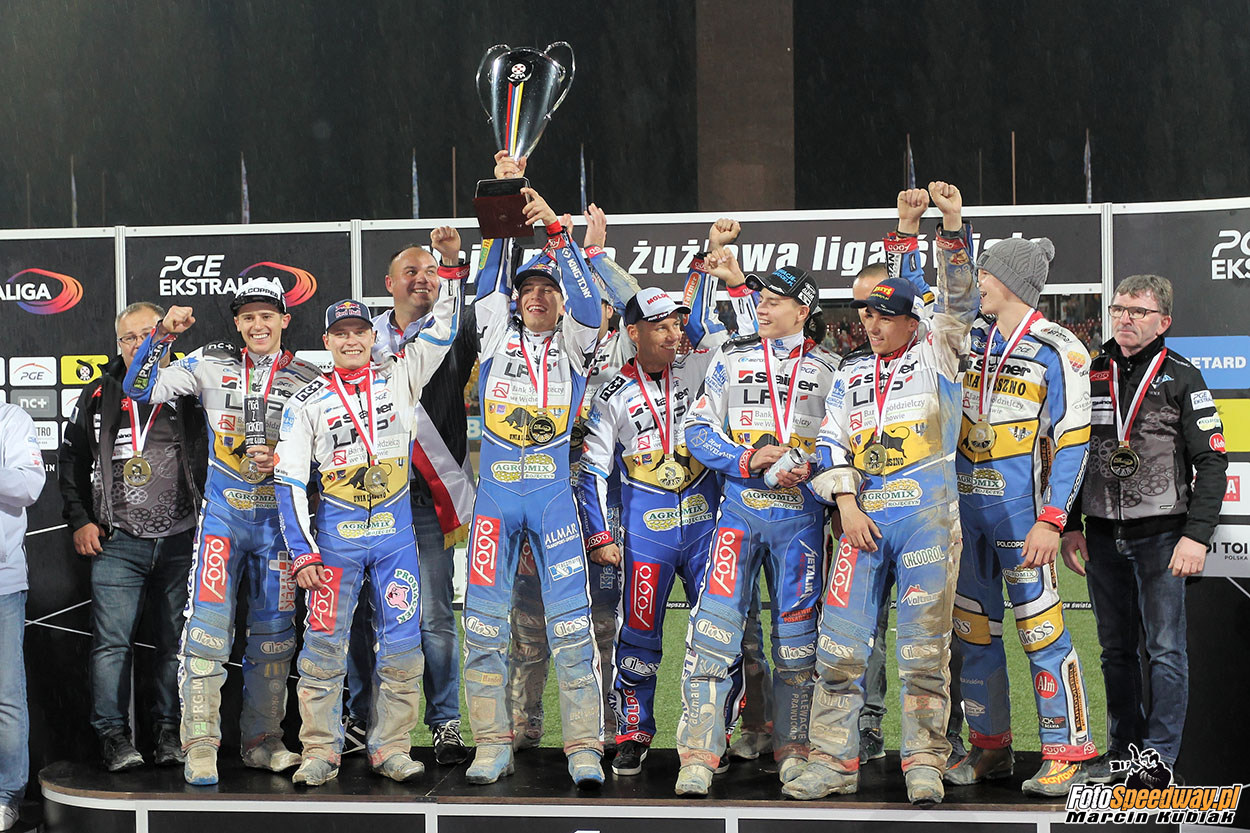
Unia Leszno riders celebrating the Polish Championship in 2017

=== Team Polish Champions ===
- Gold: 18* (1949, 1950, 1951, 1952, 1953, 1954, 1979, 1980, 1984*, 1987, 1988, 1989, 2007, 2010, 2015, 2017, 2018, 2019, 2020)
- Silver: 8 (1948, 1977, 1982, 1983, 2002, 2008, 2011, 2014)
- Bronze: 7 (1958, 1962, 1975, 1976, 1981, 1985, 1986)

=== Pair Polish Champion ===
- Gold: 10 (1980, 1984, 1987, 1988, 1989, 2003, 2012, 2015, 2019, 2020)
- Silver: 9 (1978, 1982, 1985, 1991, 1994, 1999, 2008, 2016, 2022)
- Bronze: 2 (2007, 2009)

=== Individual Polish Champion ===
- Gold: 13 (1949, 1950, 1963, 1976, 1978, 1980, 1981, 1988, 1990, 2010, 2011, 2018, 2019)
- Silver: 9 (1955, 1962, 1987, 1988, 1996, 2008, 2009, 2014, 2016)
- Bronze: 9 (1961, 1982, 1987, 1988, 1996, 2007, 2018, 2021, 2022)
