= Norbert Kościuch =

Polish speedway rider (born 1984)

- Born: 28 April 1984 (age 42); Leszno, Poland
- Nationality: Polish

Career history

Poland
- 2000–2006: Leszno
- 2007–2011: Poznań
- 2012–2014: Grudziądz
- 2015: Gniezno
- 2016–2017, 2024–2025: Piła
- 2018, 2020–2022: Łódź
- 2019: Toruń
- 2023: Gdańsk

Great Britain
- 2010–2013: Peterborough

Sweden
- 2011: Hammarby
- 2022: Indianerna

Denmark
- 2007: Fjelsted
- 2008, 2017: Esbjerg
- 2013: Grindsted
- 2014: Holstebro
- 2022: Holsted

Norbert Krzysztof Kościuch (born 28 April 1984) is a speedway rider from Poland.

== Speedway career ==
Kościuch rode in the top tier of British Speedway riding for the Peterborough Panthers during the 2013 Elite League speedway season. He began his career in Poland with Unia Leszno.
