= Speedway Ekstraliga =

Polish motorcycle speedway league

PGE Ekstraliga
- Formerly: I liga (1948–1999); Ekstraliga (2000–2006)
- Sport: Motorcycle speedway
- Founded: 1948; 78 years ago
- Commissioner: Wojciech Stępniewski
- Organizing body: Ekstraliga Żużlowa
- No. of teams: 8 (since 2014)
- Country: Poland
- Most recent champion: KS Toruń (6th title) (2026)
- Most titles: Unia Leszno (18 titles)
- Broadcaster: Poland: CANAL+ SPORT
- Sponsor: PGE Polska Grupa Energetyczna
- Level on pyramid: 1
- Relegation to: Speedway 2. Ekstraliga
- Website: ekstraliga.pl

The Speedway Ekstraliga (lit. 'Speedway Extraleague'), officially known as PGE Ekstraliga for sponsorship reasons, is the top division of motorcycle speedway in Poland and determines the winner of the Team Speedway Polish Championship. It has been called the "richest and most popular speedway league in the world", and attracts riders from all over the world. The Ekstraliga has the highest average attendances for any sport in Poland not counting football.

With the fall of communism in Poland in the 1990s and the resultant sharp increase in the value of the Złoty, the sport began to attract a wider range of star riders from other countries. The first of these was Denmark's Hans Nielsen.

In 2000, the First Division was renamed Ekstraliga, and the number of teams was reduced. Since 2015 the official sponsor of Ekstraliga is the Polish energy company PGE Polska Grupa Energetyczna, which signed the financial contract for three consecutive seasons in 2021.

== 2027 PGE Ekstraliga ==
Locations of the 2027 PGE Ekstraliga teams

In the 2027 season Ekstraliga will feature 8 teams. KS Toruń are the defending champions.

Club	2026 Position
KS Toruń	1
WTS Wrocław	2
Speedway Lublin	3
Unia Leszno	4
GKM Grudziądz	5
ZKŻ Zielona Góra	6
Stal Gorzów Wielkopolski	7
Polonia Bydgoszcz	▲1 (M2E)

== Ekstraliga Teams ==
City	Club	Current Team Name	Current Venue	Seasons in Ekstraliga	Total Seasons
Wrocław	WTS Wrocław	Betard Sparta Wrocław	Olympic Stadium, Wrocław	2000–27	28
Leszno	Unia Leszno	Fogo Unia Leszno	Alfred Smoczyk Stadium, Leszno	2000–24, 2026–27	27
Toruń	KS Toruń	PRES Grupa Deweloperska Toruń	Marian Rose Motoarena Toruń, Toruń	2000–19, 2021–27	27
Częstochowa	Włókniarz Częstochowa	Krono-Plast Włókniarz Częstochowa	Krono-Plast Arena, Częstochowa	2000–14, 2017–26	25
Gorzów Wielkopolski	Stal Gorzów Wielkopolski	Gezet Stal Gorzów	GBS Gorzów Edward Jancarz Stadium, Gorzów Wielkopolski	2000–02, 2008–27	24
Zielona Góra	ZKŻ Zielona Góra	Stelmet Falubaz Zielona Góra	Speedway Stadium, Zielona Góra	2001, 2003–05, 2007–21, 2024–27	23
Bydgoszcz	Polonia Bydgoszcz	Abramczyk Polonia Bydgoszcz	Marshal Józef Piłsudski Municipal Stadium, Bydgoszcz	2000–07, 2009–10, 2012–13, 2027	13
Grudziądz	GKM Grudziądz	Bayersystem GKM Grudziądz	Venture Industries Arena, Grudziądz	2015–27	13
Tarnów	Unia Tarnów	Defunct	Defunct	2004–08, 2010–16, 2018	13
Lublin	Speedway Lublin	Orlen Oil Motor Lublin	Jaskółcze Gniazdo Municipal Stadium, Tarnów	2019–27	9
Gdańsk	Wybrzeże Gdańsk	Wybrzeże Gdańsk	Zbigniew Podlecki Stadium, Gdańsk	2000, 2002–03, 2005, 2009, 2012, 2014	7
Rzeszów	Stal Rzeszów	Dakar Development Stal Rzeszów	Stal Rzeszów Municipal Stadium, Rzeszów	2006–08, 2011–13, 2015	7
Rybnik	KS ROW Rybnik	INNPRO ROW Rybnik	Municipal Stadium, Rybnik	2004, 2006, 2016–17, 2020, 2025	6
Piła	Polonia Piła	Polonia Piła	Asta Arena, Piła	2000–03	4
Gniezno	Start Gniezno	Ultrapur Omega Gniezno	Colonel Franciszek Hynek Municipal Stadium, Gniezno	2013	1
Ostrów Wielkopolski	TŻ Ostrovia	Moonfin Magnus Ostrów Wielkopolski	Municipal Stadium, Ostrów Wielkopolski	2022	1
Krosno	Wilki Krosno	Cellfast Wilki Krosno	Municipal Stadium, Krosno	2023	1

== Riders’ Championship ==
Starting in 2014, a League Riders’ Championship has been held annually. The current format sees 16 riders competing; the top 14 ranked in league averages from the previous season, the top ranked Junior rider and a wildcard, typically from the host club.

Year	Venue	Winner	Club
2014	Tarnów	(Russia) Emil Sayfutdinov	Apator Toruń
2015	Leszno	(Russia) Grigory Laguta	Apator Toruń
2016	Gdańsk	(Poland) Krystian Pieszczek	Falubaz Zielona Góra
2017	Gdańsk	(Denmark) Leon Madsen	Włókniarz Częstochowa
2018	Gdańsk	(Poland) Patryk Dudek	Falubaz Zielona Góra
2019	Gdańsk	(Poland) Bartosz Zmarzlik	Stal Gorzów
2020	Toruń	(Poland) Bartosz Zmarzlik	Stal Gorzów
2021	Toruń	(Australia) Jason Doyle	Unia Leszno
2022	Toruń	(Poland) Bartosz Zmarzlik	Stal Gorzów
2023	Toruń	(Poland) Bartosz Zmarzlik	Motor Lublin
2024	Łódź	(Poland) Bartosz Zmarzlik	Motor Lublin
2025	Łódź	(Denmark) Michael Jepsen Jensen	GKM Grudziądz
2026	Łódź	(Australia) Brady Kurtz	Sparta Wrocław
