= National Speedway League =

Polish motorcycle speedway competition

- Formerly: III liga (1957–1959); II liga (2000–2023)
- Sport: Motorcycle speedway
- Founded: 1957; 69 years ago
- Commissioner: Ireneusz Igielski
- Organizing body: Main Commission of Speedway Sport
- No. of teams: 7 (since 2025)
- Countries: Poland, Germany, Latvia; In past also: Czech Republic, Hungary, Ukraine
- Most recent champion: Wybrzeże Gdańsk (3rd title) (2026)
- Most titles: Start Gniezno (4 titles)
- Level on pyramid: 3
- Promotion to: Speedway 2. Ekstraliga
- Website: polskizuzel.pl/2ligazuzlowa

The Krajowa Liga Żużlowa or National Speedway League, is the third and lowest division of motorcycle speedway in Poland. It is below the Speedway Ekstraliga and the Speedway 2. Ekstraliga.

== Past winners ==
Year	Winner
1957	Start Gniezno (North Group); AMK Kraków (South Group)
1958	Unia Tarnów
1959	KS Cracovia
2000	Kolejarz Rawicz
2001	Unia Tarnów
2002	TŻ Lublin
2003	GKM Grudziądz
2004	Kolejarz Opole
2005	Start Gniezno
2006	Wybrzeże Gdańsk
2007	Kolejarz Rawicz
2008	Start Gniezno
2009	Speedway Miskolc
2010	Orzeł Łódź
2011	Polonia Piła
2012	Kolejarz Rawicz
2013	ROW Rybnik
2014	Ostrovia Ostrów
2015	Wybrzeże Gdańsk
2017	Start Gniezno
2018	Stal Rzeszów
2019	Polonia Bydgoszcz
2020	Wilki Krosno
2021	Landshut Devils
2022	PSŻ Poznań
2023	Stal Rzeszów
2024	Unia Tarnów
2025	Polonia Piła
2026	Wybrzeże Gdańsk
