= 2009 Polish Pairs Speedway Championship =

Seasons
- ← 2008 2010 →

The 2008 Polish Pairs Speedway Championship (Polish: Mistrzostwa Polski Parl Klubowych, MPPK) is the 2009 version of Polish Pairs Speedway Championship organized by the Polish Motor Union (PZM). The Final took place on 10 September 2009 in Leszno, because Unia Leszno was second in 2008 Team Speedway Polish Championship. The championships was won by Falubaz Zielona Góra; former Grand Prix riders Rafał Dobrucki, Grzegorz Walasek and junior Grzegorz Zengota.

== Results ==
- Qualifying Round 1
- 23 July 2009
- (Poland) Krosno

Pos.	Club	Pts
1	Tarnów	22
2	Rzeszów	21
3	Wrocław	17
4	Lublin	13
5	Częstochowa	10
6	Krosno	7

- Qualifying Round 2
- 23 July 2009
- (Poland) Łódź

Pos.	Club	Pts
1	Toruń	30
2	Bydgoszcz	26
3	Rybnik	20
4	Opole	17
5	Łódź	15
6	Gorzów Wlkp.	10
7	Grudziądz	8

- Qualifying Round 3
- 23 July 2009
- (Poland) Piła

Pos.	Club	Pts
1	Zielona Góra	26
2	Ostrów Wlkp.	25
3	Gniezno	24
4	Poznań	17
5	Piła	12
6	Rawicz	11
7	Gdańsk	11

- The Final
- 10 September 2009
- (Poland) Leszno

Pos.	Club	Pts
1st	Zielona Góra	
2nd	Tarnów	
3rd	Leszno	
4	Ostrów Wlkp.	
5	Bydgoszcz	
6	Rzeszów	
7	Toruń	

=== The Final ===
- 14 August 2009
- Leszno, Alfred Smoczyk Stadium
- Referee: Ryszard Bryła
- Best time: 60.31 secs - Jarosław Hampel in Heat 4
- Change:

(2) injury Przemysław Pawlicki → Sławomir Musielak

Placing	Pair / Rider Name	Total	1	2	3	4	5	6	7	8	9	10	11	12	13	14	15	16	17	18	19	20	21	22
1	Kronopol Zielona Góra	25							9							17							25
1	(7) Rafał Dobrucki	13+1		2*				1			3					2				2			3
1	(8) Grzegorz Walasek	12+4		3				3			2*					1*				1*			2*
1	(18) Grzegorz Zengota	0
2	Unia Tarnów	21 +3							6							12							21
2	(9) Sebastian Ułamek	11+2			3			2				1*		-			3					2*
2	(10) Piotr Świderski	5			1			0				-		3			1					-
2	(19) Janusz Kołodziej	5										2		R								3		3
3	Unia Leszno	21 +2							9							16							21
3	(1) Jarosław Hampel	17	3			3				3			3				2			3				2
3	(2) Sławomir Musielak	4+1	2*			1				0			1				0			0
3	(15) Tobiasz Musielak	0
4	KM Intar Lazur Ostrów Wlkp.	18							5							11							18
4	(13) Robert Miśkowiak	17				2			3			3				3			3		3
4	(14) Mariusz Staszewski	0				-			-			-				-			-		-
4	(21) Patryk Kociemba	1				0			0			0				0			0		1
5	Polonia Bydgoszcz	17							5							11							17
5	(11) Krzysztof Buczkowski	9			2				2				-		1			3					1
5	(12) Marcin Jędrzejewski	0			0				-				0		-			-					0
5	(20) Tomasz Chrzanowski	8+2							1*				2		3			2*
6	Marma Hadykówka Rzeszów	15							6							11							15
6	(5) Dawid Stachyra	7+2		X			2*			2					2				1*			0
6	(6) Maciej Kuciapa	8+1		1			3			1*					0				2			1
7	Unibax Toruń	9							2							6							9
7	(3) Damian Celmer	5	1				1				1			1				1			-
7	(4) Kamil Pulczyński	2	0				-				0			-				-			2
7	(16) Emil Pulczyński	2					0							2				0			0
Placing	Pair / Rider Name	Total	1	2	3	4	5	6	7	8	9	10	11	12	13	14	15	16	17	18	19	20	21	22

m - exclusion for exceeding two minute time allowance • t - exclusion for touching the tapes • x - other exclusion • e - retired or mechanical failure • f - fell
ns - non-starter • nc - non-classify

gate A - inside	gate B	gate C	gate D - outside

== See also ==
- 2009 Team Speedway Polish Championship
- 2009 Individual Speedway Polish Championship
- 2009 Polish Pairs Speedway Junior Championship
