= 1990 Mieczysław Połukard Criterium of Polish Speedway Leagues Aces =

Polish speedway event

1990 Criterium of Aces

Seasons
- ← 1989 1991 →

The 9th Mieczysław Połukard Criterium of Polish Speedway League Aces was the 1990 version of the Mieczysław Połukard Criterium of Polish Speedway Leagues Aces. It took place on March 25 in the Polonia Stadium in Bydgoszcz, Poland.

== Starting positions draw ==
1. Ryszard Dołomisiewicz - Polonia Bydgoszcz
2. Jan Krzystyniak - Stal Rzeszów
3. Piotr Świst - Stal Gorzów Wlkp.
4. Jerzy Głogowski - Motor Lublin
5. Antoni Skupień - ROW Rybnik
6. Jacek Gomólski - Start Gniezno
7. Zenon Kasprzak - Unia Leszno
8. Sławomir Drabik - Włókniarz Częstochowa
9. Wojciech Załuski - Kolejarz Opole
10. Janusz Stachyra - Stal Rzeszów
11. Tomasz Gollob - Polonia Bydgoszcz
12. Andrzej Huszcza - Falubaz Zielona Góra
13. Wojciech Żabiałowicz - Apator Toruń
14. Jacek Woźniak - Polonia Bydgoszcz
15. Jacek Rempała - Unia Tarnów
16. Jarosław Olszewski - Wybrzeże Gdańsk

== Heat details ==
Placing	Rider	Total	1	2	3	4	5	6	7	8	9	10	11	12	13	14	15	16	17	18	19	20	Pts	Pos	21
1	(11) Tomasz Gollob (BYD)	15			3				3		3					3						3	15	1	
2	(3) Piotr Świst (GOR)	11	2						2				2				3				2		11	2	
3	(5) Antoni Skupień (RYB)	10		3			0					3					2					2	10	3	3
4	(7) Zenon Kasprzak (LES)	10		2					0					2	3					3			10	4	2
5	(9) Wojciech Załuski (OPO)	10			1		3						3					1		2			10	5	1
6	(14) Jacek Woźniak (BYD)	9				2		3					1		2							1	9	6	
7	(4) Jerzy Głogowski (LUB)	8	0							3				3				2				0	8	7	
8	(1) Ryszard Dołomisiewicz (BYD)	8	3				2				E				0				3				8	8	
9	(13) Wojciech Żabiałowicz (TOR)	6				0	1							0		2					3		6	9	
10	(6) Jacek Gomólski (GNI)	6		1				0			2							3			0		6	10	
11	(2) Jan Krzystyniak (RZE)	6	1					2				2				E				1			6	11	
12	(15) Jacek Rempała (TAR)	5				3			1			1						0	0				5	12	
13	(8) Sławomir Drabik (CZE)	5		0						2			0			1			2				5	13	
14	(10) Janusz Stachyra (RZE)	5			2			1						1			0		1				5	14	
15	(12) Andrzej Huszcza (ZIE)	3			0					1		0			1						1		3	15	
16	(16) Jarosław Olszewski (GDA)	3				1				E	1						1			0			3	16	
Placing	Rider	Total	1	2	3	4	5	6	7	8	9	10	11	12	13	14	15	16	17	18	19	20	Pts	Pos	21

m - exclusion for exceeding two minute time allowance • t - exclusion for touching the tapes • x - other exclusion • e - retired or mechanical failure • f - fell • ns - non-starter • nc - non-classify

gate A - inside	gate B	gate C	gate D - outside

== Sources ==
- Roman Lach - Polish Speedway Almanac
