= 1987 Mieczysław Połukard Criterium of Polish Speedway Leagues Aces =

Polish speedway event

1987 Criterium of Aces

Seasons
- ← 1986 1988 →

The 6th Mieczysław Połukard Criterium of Polish Speedway League Aces was the 1987 version of the Mieczysław Połukard Criterium of Polish Speedway Leagues Aces. It took place on March 29 in the Polonia Stadium in Bydgoszcz, Poland.

== Final standings ==
Pos.	Rider name	Pts.	Heats
1	Wojciech Żabiałowicz (TOR)	13+3	(3,3,1,3,3)
2	Eugeniusz Błaszak (TAR)	13+2	(2,3,3,3,2)
3	Ryszard Dołomisiewicz (BYD)	13+1	(3,3,2,2,3)
4	Andrzej Huszcza (ZIE)	10	(1,3,3,0,3)
5	Zenon Kasprzak (LES)	10	(2,2,3,2,1)
6	Zdzisław Rutecki (BYD)	9	(3,2,3,1,0)
7	Ryszard Franczyszyn (GOR)	9	(1,1,2,2,3)
8	Wojciech Załuski (OPO)	7	(X,2,0,3,2)
9	Roman Jankowski (LES)	7	(3,1,1,2,0)
10	Marek Kępa (LUB)	6	(1,2,3,F,0)
11	Marek Ziarnik (BYD)	6	(2,E,0,2,2)
12	Grzegorz Dzikowski (GDA)	6	(0,1,2,1,2)
13	Piotr Podrzycki (GNI)	4	(2,0,1,0,1)
14	Henryk Bem (RYB)	3	(E,0,1,1,1)
15	Bolesław Proch (BYD)	1	(X,E,1,-,-)
16	Sławomir Drabik (CZE)	0	(0,E,E,0,0)

== Sources ==
- Roman Lach - Polish Speedway Almanac
