= 1991 Mieczysław Połukard Criterium of Polish Speedway Leagues Aces =

Polish speedway event

1991 Criterium of Aces

Seasons
- ← 1990 1992 →

The 10th Mieczysław Połukard Criterium of Polish Speedway League Aces was the 1991 version of the Mieczysław Połukard Criterium of Polish Speedway Leagues Aces. It took place on March 24 in the Polonia Stadium in Bydgoszcz, Poland.

== Starting positions draw ==
1. Mirosław Kowalik - Apator Toruń
2. Mirosław Korbel - ROW Rybnik
3. Jacek Woźniak - Polonia Bydgoszcz
4. Jarosław Olszewski - Wybrzeże Gdańsk
5. Tomasz Gollob - Polonia Bydgoszcz
6. Jacek Gomólski - Start Gniezno
7. Dariusz Śledź - Motor Lublin
8. Zenon Kasprzak - Unia Leszno
9. Jan Krzystyniak - Stal-Westa Rzeszów
10. Sławomir Drabik - Włókniarz Częstochowa
11. Ryszard Dołomisiewicz - Polonia Bydgoszcz
12. Roman Jankowski - Unia Leszno
13. Jacek Krzyżaniak - Apator Toruń
14. Wojciech Zaluski - Kolejarz-Remak Opole
15. Andrzej Huszcza - Morawski Zielona Góra
16. Jacek Gollob - Polonia Bydgoszcz
17. (R1) Leszek Sokołowski - Polonia Bydgoszcz
18. (R2) Tomasz Kornacki - Polonia Bydgoszcz

== Heat details ==
Placing	Rider	Total	1	2	3	4	5	6	7	8	9	10	11	12	13	14	15	16	17	18	19	20	Pts	Pos	21
1	(5) Tomasz Gollob (BYD)	13		3			1					3					3					3	13	1	
2	(9) Jan Krzystyniak (RZE)	11			1		3						1					3		3			11	2	3
3	(15) Andrzej Huszcza (ZIE)	11				3			2			2						2	2				11	3	2
4	(10) Sławomir Drabik (CZE)	10			3			3						3			1		M/-				10	4	
5	(11) R. Dołomisiewicz (BYD)	10			2				3		3					2						F	10	5	
6	(3) Jacek Woźniak (BYD)	9	2						E				2				2				3		9	6	
7	(12) Roman Jankowski (LES)	8			0					3		1			2						2		8	7	
8	(13) Jacek Krzyżaniak (TOR)	8				2	2							0		3					1		8	8	
9	(2) Mirosław Korbel (RYB)	8	3					2				0				1				2			8	9	
10	(1) Mirosław Kowalik (TOR)	7	1				0				0				3				3				7	10	
11	(4) Jarosław Olszewski (GDA)	6	0							2				2				0				2	6	11	
12	(6) Jacek Gomólski (GNI)	5		2				0			2							1			0		5	12	
13	(8) Zenon Kasprzak (LES)	4		0						1			3			E			0				4	13	
14	(16) Jacek Gollob (BYD)	3				1				0	1						0			1			3	14	
15	(14) Wojciech Załuski (OPO)	3				0		1					0		1							1	3	15	
16	(7) Dariusz Śledź (LUB)	3		1					1					1	0					0			3	16	
R1	(R1) Leszek Sokołowski (BYD)	1																	1				1	R1	
R2	(R2) Tomasz Kornacki (BYD)	0																					0	R2	
Placing	Rider	Total	1	2	3	4	5	6	7	8	9	10	11	12	13	14	15	16	17	18	19	20	Pts	Pos	21

m - exclusion for exceeding two minute time allowance • t - exclusion for touching the tapes • x - other exclusion • e - retired or mechanical failure • f - fell • ns - non-starter • nc - non-classify

gate A - inside	gate B	gate C	gate D - outside

== Sources ==
- Roman Lach - Polish Speedway Almanac
