= 1989 Mieczysław Połukard Criterium of Polish Speedway Leagues Aces =

Polish speedway event

1989 Criterium of Aces

Seasons
- ← 1988 1990 →

The 8th Mieczysław Połukard Criterium of Polish Speedway League Aces was the 1989 version of the Mieczysław Połukard Criterium of Polish Speedway Leagues Aces. It took place on March 19 in the Polonia Stadium in Bydgoszcz, Poland.

== Starting positions draw ==
1. Jacek Gomólski - Polonia Bydgoszcz
2. Wojciech Żabiałowicz - Apator Toruń
3. Roman Jankowski - Unia Leszno
4. Zenon Kasprzak - Unia Leszno
5. Jacek Woźniak - Polonia Bydgoszcz
6. Zdzisław Rutecki - Polonia Bydgoszcz
7. Mirosław Korbel - ROW Rybnik
8. Ryszard Franczyszyn - Stal Gorzów Wlkp.
9. Janusz Stachyra - Stal Rzeszów
10. Andrzej Huszcza - Falubaz Zielona Góra
11. Krzysztof Okupski - Stal Gorzów Wlkp.
12. Wojciech Załuski - Kolejarz Opole
13. Stanisław Miedziński - Apator Toruń
14. Waldemar Cieślewicz - Polonia Bydgoszcz
15. Janusz Kapustka - Unia Tarnów
16. Sławomir Drabik - Włókniarz Częstochowa
17. (R1) Zbigniew Bizoń - Polonia Bydgoszcz
18. (R2) Krzysztof Ziarnik - Polonia Bydgoszcz

== Heat details ==
Placing	Rider	Total	1	2	3	4	5	6	7	8	9	10	11	12	13	14	15	16	17	18	19	20	Pts	Pos	21	22
1	(3) Roman Jankowski (LES)	13	2						3				2				3				3		13	2		3
2	(4) Zenon Kasprzak (LES)	13	1							3				3				3				3	13	1		2
3	(8) Ryszard Franczyszyn (GOR)	12		3						E			3			3			3				12	3		
4	(12) Wojciech Załuski (OPO)	9			T/-					2		2			3						2		9	5	3	
5	(10) Andrzej Huszcza (ZIE)	9			2			2						2			2		1				9	7	2	
6	(1) Jacek Gomólski (BYD)	9	3				1				1				2				2				9	6	1	
7	(9) Janusz Stachyra (RZE)	9			1		3						0					2		3			9	4	0	
8	(6) Zdzisław Rutecki (BYD)	8		T/-				3			3							1			1		8	8		
9	(11) Krzysztof Okupski (GOR)	8			2				3		T					1						2	8	9		
10	(2) Wojciech Żabiałowicz (TOR)	6	0					0				3				2				1			6	10		
11	(14) Waldemar Cieślewicz (BYD)	5				3		1					1		0							0	5	11		
12	(16) Sławomir Drabik (CZE)	5				1				1	0						1			2			5	12		
13	(5) Jacek Woźniak (BYD)	5		1			2					1					0					1	5	13		
14	(15) Janusz Kapustka (TAR)	3				2			1			0						0	0				3	14		
15	(7) Mirosław Korbel (RYB)	3		2					0					0	1					0			3	15		
16	(13) Stanisław Miedziński (TOR)	1				0	E							1		0					0		1	16		
R1	(R1) Zbigniew Bizoń (BYD)	0		0																			0	R1		
R2	(R2) Krzysztof Ziarnik (BYD)	0			0																		0	R2		
Placing	Rider	Total	1	2	3	4	5	6	7	8	9	10	11	12	13	14	15	16	17	18	19	20	Pts	Pos	21	22

m - exclusion for exceeding two minute time allowance • t - exclusion for touching the tapes • x - other exclusion • e - retired or mechanical failure • f - fell • ns - non-starter • nc - non-classify

gate A - inside	gate B	gate C	gate D - outside

== Sources ==
- Roman Lach - Polish Speedway Almanac
