= 2009 Polish Pairs Speedway Junior Championship =

Seasons
- ← 2008 2010 →

The 2008 Polish Pairs Speedway Junior Championship (Polish: Młodzieżowe Mistrzostwa Polski Parl Klubowych, MMPPK) is the 2009 version of Polish Pairs Speedway Junior Championship organized by the Polish Motor Union (PZM). The Final took place on 14 August 2009 in Rybnik. The championships was won by Unia Leszno's riders: Sławomir Musielak and Przemysław Pawlicki.

== Results ==
- Qualifying Round 1
- 17 June 2009
- (Poland) Opole

Pos.	Club	Pts
1	Częstochowa	20
2	Zielona Góra	19
3	Gorzów Wlkp.	17
4	Rzeszów	16
5	Opole	10
6	Krosno	8

- Qualifying Round 2
- 17 June 2009
- (Poland) Rawicz

Pos.	Club	Pts
1	Leszno	23
2	Poznań	22
3	Tarnów	14
4	Bydgoszcz	13
5	Rawicz	5
6	Lublin	5

- Qualifying Round 3
- 17 June 2009
- (Poland) Grudziądz

Pos.	Club	Pts
1	Toruń	25
2	Taczanów	20
3	Gdańsk	19
4	Grudziądz	18
5	Gniezno	16
6	Ostrów Wlkp.	13
7	Piła	13

- The Final
- 14 August 2009
- (Poland) Rybnik

Pos.	Club	Pts
1st	Leszno	24+3
2nd	Zielona Góra	24+2
3rd	Taczanów	23
4	Rybnik	21
5	Poznań	13
6	Częstochowa	11
7	Toruń	9

=== The Final ===
- The Final
- 14 August 2009 (17:30 CEST)
- Rybnik
- Referee: Tomasz Proszowski
- Best time: 64.32 - Przemysław Pawlicki in Heat 8 and Maciej Janowski in Heat 12
- Attendance: 3,000

Placing	Pair / Rider Name	Total	1	2	3	4	5	6	7	8	9	10	11	12	13	14	15	16	17	18	19	20	21	22
1	Unia Leszno	24 +3							9							16							24
1	(5) Sławomir Musielak	7+3		1			2*			Fx					1				2*			1*
1	(6) Przemysław Pawlicki	17		3			3			3					3				3			2		3
1	(17) Mateusz Łukaszewski	0
2	Falubaz Zielona Góra	24 +2							4							14							24
2	(7) Grzegorz Zengota	12		0				0			3					3				3			3	2
2	(8) Patryk Dudek	12+4		2				2			2*					2*				2*			2*
2	(18) Janusz Baniak	0
3	UKS Żaki Taczanów	23							8							17							23
3	(9) Bartosz Szymura	5+1			1			1				1		2*			X					0
3	(10) Maciej Piaszczyński	0			-			-				-		-			-					-
3	(19) Maciej Janowski	18			3			3				3		3			3					3
4	RKM ROW Rybnik	21							9							17							21
4	(1) Sławomir Pyszny	12+1	3			3				2			2*				1			1
4	(2) Rafał Fleger	1	1			-				-			-				-			-
4	(15) Michał Mitko	8+1				2*				1			3				2			0
5	PSŻ Milion Team Poznań	13							5							8							13
5	(11) Adam Kajoch	6			0				2				1		0			3					0
5	(12) Grzegorz Stróżyk	7			2				1				Fx		2			1					1
6	Włókniarz Częstochowa	11							4							7							11
6	(13) Borys Miturski	7				1			3			2				1			0		Fx
6	(14) Marcin Piekarski	0				R			R			-				Fx			-		-
6	(21) Kamil Cieślar	4										0							1		3
7	Unibax Toruń	9							3							5							9
7	(3) Kamil Pulczyński	1	0				0				0			1				0			-
7	(4) Emil Pulczyński	8	2				1				1			0				2			2
7	(16) Damian Boniecki	0																			Fx
Placing	Pair / Rider Name	Total	1	2	3	4	5	6	7	8	9	10	11	12	13	14	15	16	17	18	19	20	21	22

m - exclusion for exceeding two minute time allowance • t - exclusion for touching the tapes • x - other exclusion • e - retired or mechanical failure • f - fell
ns - non-starter • nc - non-classify

gate A - inside	gate B	gate C	gate D - outside

== See also ==
- 2009 Team Speedway Junior Polish Championship
- 2009 Individual Speedway Junior Polish Championship
- 2009 Polish Pairs Speedway Championship
