= 1988 Mieczysław Połukard Criterium of Polish Speedway Leagues Aces =

Polish speedway event

1988 Criterium of Aces

Seasons
- ← 1987 1989 →

The 7th Mieczysław Połukard Criterium of Polish Speedway League Aces was the 1988 version of the Mieczysław Połukard Criterium of Polish Speedway Leagues Aces. It took place on March 27 in the Polonia Stadium in Bydgoszcz, Poland.

== Starting positions draw ==
1. Marek Ziarnik - Polonia Bydgoszcz
2. Wojciech Żabiałowicz - Apator Toruń
3. Jacek Woźniak - Polonia Bydgoszcz
4. Janusz Stachyra - Stal Rzeszów
5. Ryszard Dołomisiewicz - Polonia Bydgoszcz
6. Ryszard Franczyszyn - Stal Gorzów Wlkp.
7. Andrzej Huszcza - Falubaz Zielona Góra
8. Piotr Świst - Stal Gorzów Wlkp.
9. Jacek Brucheiser - Ostrovia Ostrów Wlkp.
10. Krzysztof Ziarnik - Polonia Bydgoszcz
11. Grzegorz Śniegowski - Start Gniezno
12. Sławomir Drabik - Włókniarz Częstochowa
13. Wojciech Załuski - Kolejarz Opole
14. Eugeniusz Skupień - ROW Rybnik
15. Marek Kępa - Motor Lublin
16. Mirosław Korbel - ROW Rybnik
17. (R1) Piotr Glücklich - Polonia Bydgoszcz
18. (R2) Adamczak - Polonia Bydgoszcz

== Heat details ==
| Placing | Rider | Total | 1 | 2 | 3 | 4 | 5 | 6 | 7 | 8 | 9 | 10 | 11 | 12 | 13 | 14 | 15 | 16 | 17 | 18 | 19 | 20 | Pts | Pos | 21 |
|---|---|---|---|---|---|---|---|---|---|---|---|---|---|---|---|---|---|---|---|---|---|---|---|---|---|
| 1 | (5) Ryszard Dołomisiewicz (BYD) | 14 | | 3 | | | 3 | | | | | 3 | | | | | 2 | | | | | 3 | 14 | 1 | |
| 2 | (14) Eugeniusz Skupień (RYB) | 11 | | | | 3 | | 1 | | | | | 2 | | 3 | | | | | | | 2 | 11 | 2 | 3 |
| 3 | (12) Sławomir Drabik (CZE) | 11 | | | 3 | | | | | 2 | | 2 | | | 2 | | | | | | 2 | | 11 | 3 | 2 |
| 4 | (6) Ryszard Franczyszyn (GOR) | 10 | | 0 | | | | 3 | | | 3 | | | | | | | 1 | | | 3 | | 10 | 4 | |
| 5 | (1) Marek Ziarnik (BYD) | 10 | 2 | | | | 2 | | | | 3 | | | | 0 | | | | 3 | | | | 10 | 5 | |
| 6 | (16) Mirosław Korbel (RYB) | 10 | | | | 2 | | | | X | 2 | | | | | | 3 | | | 3 | | | 10 | 6 | |
| 7 | (4) Janusz Stachyra (RZE) | 10 | 1 | | | | | | | 3 | | | | 3 | | | | 2 | | | | 1 | 10 | 7 | |
| 8 | (8) Piotr Świst (GOR) | 10 | | 1 | | | | | | 1 | | | 3 | | | 3 | | | 2 | | | | 10 | 8 | |
| 9 | (2) Wojciech Żabiałowicz (TOR) | 9 | 3 | | | | | 2 | | | | 1 | | | | 2 | | | | 1 | | | 9 | 9 | |
| 10 | (7) Andrzej Huszcza (ZIE) | 7 | | 2 | | | | | E | | | | | 2 | 1 | | | | | 2 | | | 7 | 10 | |
| 11 | (11) Grzegorz Śniegowski (GNI) | 5 | | | 2 | | | | 3 | | 0 | | | | | F/- | | | | | | - | 5 | 11 | |
| 12 | (3) Jacek Woźniak (BYD) | 4 | 0 | | | | | | 2 | | | | 1 | | | | 0 | | | | 1 | | 4 | 12 | |
| 13 | (15) Marek Kępa (LUB) | 3 | | | | 0 | | | 1 | | | 0 | | | | | | 1 | 1 | | | | 3 | 13 | |
| 14 | (13) Wojciech Załuski (OPO) | 3 | | | | 1 | 1 | | | | | | | 1 | | X | | | | | - | | 3 | 14 | |
| 15 | (9) Jacek Brucheiser (OST) | 1 | | | 1 | | 0 | | | | | | 0 | | | | | E | | 0 | | | 1 | 15 | |
| 16 | (10) Krzysztof Ziarnik (BYD) | 1 | | | 0 | | | 0 | | | | | | 0 | | | 0 | | 1 | | | | 1 | 16 | |
| R1 | (R1) Piotr Glücklich (BYD) | 1 | | | | | | | | | | | | | | 1 | | | | | 0 | | 1 | R1 | |
| R2 | (R2) Adamczak (BYD) | 0 | | | | | | | | | | | | | | | | | | | | 0 | 0 | R2 | |
| Placing | Rider | Total | 1 | 2 | 3 | 4 | 5 | 6 | 7 | 8 | 9 | 10 | 11 | 12 | 13 | 14 | 15 | 16 | 17 | 18 | 19 | 20 | Pts | Pos | 21 |

m - exclusion for exceeding two minute time allowance • t - exclusion for touching the tapes • x - other exclusion • e - retired or mechanical failure • f - fell • ns - non-starter • nc - non-classify

| gate A - inside | gate B | gate C | gate D - outside |

== Sources ==
- Roman Lach - Polish Speedway Almanac
