= 1986 Mieczysław Połukard Criterium of Polish Speedway Leagues Aces =

Polish speedway event

1986 Criterium of Aces

Seasons
- ← 1985 1987 →

The 5th Criterium of Polish Speedway League Aces was the 1986 version of the Criterium of Polish Speedway Leagues Aces. It took place on March 23 in the Polonia Stadium in Bydgoszcz, Poland.

== Final standings ==
Pos.	Rider name	Pts.	Heats
1	Roman Jankowski (LES)	9	(3,3,3)
2	Grzegorz Dzikowski (GDA)	7	(3,1,3)
3	Wojciech Żabiałowicz (TOR)	7	(1,3,3)
4	Ryszard Franczyszyn (GOR)	6	(3,3,X)
5	Mirosław Berliński (GDA)	6	(1,2,3)
6	Ryszard Dołomisiewicz (BYD)	5	(2,3,0)
7	Andrzej Huszcza (ZIE)	5	(3,2,X)
8	Marek Ziarnik (BYD)	5	(2,1,2)
9	Jerzy Rembas (GOR)	4	(2,1,1)
10	Jacek Brucheiser (OST)	3	(1,2,X)
11	Bogusław Nowak (TAR)	3	(1,0,2)
12	Janusz Stachyra (RZE)	3	(0,2,1)
13	Piotr Podrzycki (GNI)	2	(0,0,2)
14	Jerzy Kochman (ŚWI)	2	(2,E)
15	(Czechoslovakia) Ladislav Hradecky (CSK)	0	(0,0,E)
16	Ryszard Buśkiewicz (BYD)	0	(0,E)

== Sources ==
- Roman Lach - Polish Speedway Almanac
