= 2014 Polish speedway season =

Motorcycle racing season

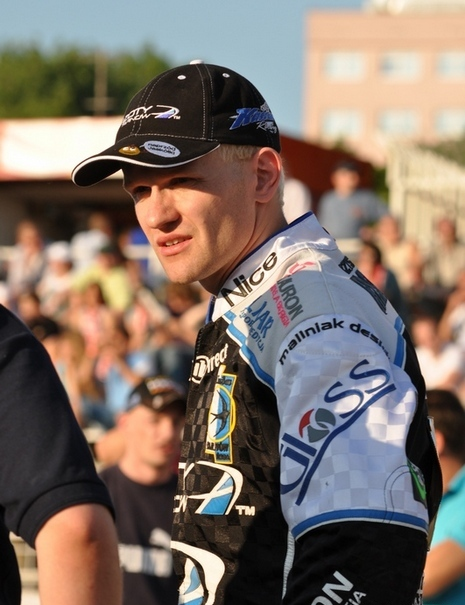
- Krzysztof Kasprzak, 2014 Polish champion and league winner with Gorzów

The 2014 Polish Speedway season was the 2014 season of motorcycle speedway in Poland.

== Individual ==
=== Polish Individual Speedway Championship ===
The 2014 Individual Speedway Polish Championship final was held on 14 August at Zielona Góra. Krzysztof Kasprzak won the Polish Championship.

Pos.	Rider	Club	Total	Points
1	Krzysztof Kasprzak	Stal Gorzów Wlkp.	10 +2+3	(1,3,3,d,3)
2	Piotr Pawlicki Jr.	Unia Leszno	14 +2	(3,3,3,3,2)
3	Janusz Kołodziej	Unia Tarnów	14 +1	(3,2,3,3,3)
4	Grzegorz Zengota	Unia Leszno	10 +3+0	(3,3,2,1,1)
5	Przemysław Pawlicki	Unia Leszno	11 +1	(3,1,3,1,3)
6	Bartosz Zmarzlik	Stal Gorzów Wlkp.	9 +0	(2,1,1,3,2)
7	Jarosław Hampel	Falubaz Zielona Góra	8	(1,0,1,3,3)
8	Norbert Kościuch	GKM Grudziądz	7	(0,2,2,2,1)
9	Piotr Protasiewicz	Falubaz Zielona Góra	7	(1,0,2,2,2)
10	Kacper Gomólski	Unia Tarnów	7	(2,1,1,2,1)
11	Piotr Świderski	Stal Gorzów Wlkp.	6	(2,3,0,1,0)
12	Krzysztof Buczkowski	Unia Tarnów	6	(2,2,1,1,0)
13	Kamil Adamczewski (res)	Falubaz Zielona Góra	4	(2,0,0,2)
14	Tomasz Jędrzejak	Sparta Wrocław	4	(1,1,0,2,0)
15	Tobiasz Musielak	Unia Leszno	3	(0,0,2,1,0)
16	Krystian Pieszczek	Wybrzeże Gdańsk	1	(0,u,0,0,1)
17	Krzysztof Jabłoński	Falubaz Zielona Góra	0	(u/ns,–,–,–,–)
18	Szymon Woźniak (res)	Polonia Bydgoszcz	ns	

=== Golden Helmet ===
The 2014 Golden Golden Helmet (Polish: Turniej o Złoty Kask, ZK) organised by the Polish Motor Union (PZM) was the 2014 event for the league's leading riders. The final was held at Rawicz on the 12 October. Przemysław Pawlicki won the Golden Helmet for the first time. His brother Piotr had won it two years earlier in 2012.

Pos.	Rider	Club	Total	Points
1	Przemysław Pawlicki	Leszno	13	(3,3,2,2,3)
2	Kacper Gomólski	Tarnów	11 +3	(3,3,0,3,2)
3	Grzegorz Walasek	Częstochowa	11 +2	(3,1,3,3,1)
4	Damian Baliński	Leszno	10	(1,3,3,1,2)
5	Krzysztof Buczkowski	Tarnów	9 +3	(3,2,2,0,2)
6	Adrian Miedziński	Toruń	9 +2	(2,w,1,3,3)
7	Robert Miśkowiak	Lublin	9 +1	(1,2,3,d,3)
8	Sebastian Ułamek	Grudziądz	8	(2,0,0,3,3)
9	Piotr Świderski	Gorzów Wlkp.	8	(1,3,2,1,1)
10	Grzegorz Zengota	Leszno	7	(2,0,3,2,0)
11	Maciej Janowski	Wrocław	6	(0,2,2,0,2)
12	Piotr Protasiewicz	Zielona Góra	6	(0,2,1,2,1)
13	Kamil Brzozowski	Ostrów Wlkp.	6	(2,1,1,2,d)
14	Mirosław Jabłoński	Częstochowa	3	(0,1,0,1,1)
15	Karol Baran	Kraków	2	(0,1,1,d,–)
16	Paweł Miesiąc	Rzeszów	1	(1,0,t,0,–)
17	Sebastian Niedźwiedź (res)	Rawicz	0	(d,u)
18	Marcel Kajzer (res)	Rawicz	0	(d)

=== Junior Championship ===
- winner - Szymon Wozniak

=== Silver Helmet ===
- winner - Piotr Pawlicki Jr.

=== Bronze Helmet ===
- winner - Adrian Cyfer

== Pairs ==
=== Polish Pairs Speedway Championship ===
The 2014 Polish Pairs Speedway Championship was the 2014 edition of the Polish Pairs Speedway Championship. The final was held on 19 October at Gorzów Wielkopolski.

Pos	Team	Pts	Riders
1	Stal Gorzów Wlkp.	28	Krzysztof Kasprzak 14, Bartosz Zmarzlik 14
2	Toruń	26	Oskar Fajfer 12, Paweł Przedpełski 14
3	Unia Tarnów	19	Krzysztof Buczkowski 9, Kacper Gomólski 10
4	ŻKS ROW Rybnik	15	Michał Szczepaniak 7, Rafał Szombierski 8
5	GKM Grudziądz	14	Daniel Jeleniewski 0, Sebastian Ułamek 14, Mike Trzensiok 0
6	KMŻ Lublin	13	Dawid Lampart 9, Robert Miśkowiak 4
7	Falubaz Zielona Góra	11	Kamil Adamczewski 5, Krzysztof Jabłoński 6, Alex Zgardziński 0

== Team ==
=== Team Speedway Polish Championship ===
The 2014 Team Speedway Polish Championship was the 2014 edition of the Team Polish Championship. Stal Gorzów Wielkopolski won the gold medal. The team included Krzysztof Kasprzak, Niels Kristian Iversen and Bartosz Zmarzlik.

==== Ekstraliga ====
Pos	Team	P	Pts	W	D	L	BP	Diff
1	Unia Tarnów	14	32	12	1	1	7	+240
2	Stal Gorzów Wielkopolski	14	24	9	1	4	5	+113
3	Falubaz Zielona Góra	14	20	8	1	5	3	+102
4	Unia Leszno	14	19	7	2	5	3	+35
5	Unibax Toruń	14	1	9	0	5	5	+136
6	WTS Sparta Wrocław	14	10	3	1	10	3	–102
7	Włókniarz Częstochowa	14	7	3	0	11	1	–147
8	Wybrzeże Gdańsk	14	4	2	0	12	0	–377

Play offs

Team	Team	Team	Score
semi final	Tarnów	Leszno	40:50, 42:48
semi final	Gorzów	Zielona Góra	41:49, 62:28
final	Gorzów	Leszno	44:46, 49:41

==== 1.Liga ====
Pos	Team	P	W	D	L	Diff	Pts	BP	Total
1	Stal Rzeszów	14	8	1	5	17	7	24	+158
2	GKM Grudziądz	14	9	0	5	18	5	23	+46
3	Orzeł Łódź	14	7	1	6	15	4	19	+61
4	Start Gniezno	14	8	0	6	16	1	17	-64
5	Polonia Bydgoszcz	14	6	0	8	12	4	16	-2
6	Lokomotiv Daugavpils (Latvia)	14	6	1	7	12	3	16	-64
7	ŻKS ROW Rybnik	14	6	1	7	13	2	15	-60
8	KMŻ Lublin	14	3	2	9	8	1	9	-75

Play offs

Team	Team	Team	Score
semi final	Gniezno	Rzeszów	34:56, 28:61
semi final	Łódź	Grudziądz	48:42, 43:47
final	Łódź	Rzeszów	48:42, 35:55

==== 2.Liga ====
Pos	Team	P	W	D	L	Diff	Pts	BP	Total
1	Ostrów Wlkp.	10	9	0	1	18	5	23	+142
2	Wanda Kraków	10	7	0	3	14	4	18	+85
3	KSM Krosno	10	6	1	3	13	3	16	+72
4	Polonia Piła	10	4	1	5	9	2	11	-27
5	Kolejarz Rawicz	10	2	0	8	4	1	5	-100
6	Kolejarz Opole	10	1	0	9	2	0	2	-172

Play offs

Team	Team	Team	Score
semi final	Piła	Ostrów	51:39, 25:65
semi final	Krosno	Kraków	42:48, 28:62
final	Kraków	Ostrów	54:36, 28:61
