= 2013 Polish speedway season =

Motorcycle racing season

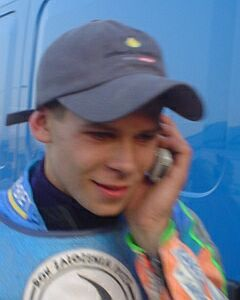
- Janusz Kołodziej became Polish champion for the third time.

The 2013 Polish Speedway season was the 2013 season of motorcycle speedway in Poland.

== Individual ==
=== Polish Individual Speedway Championship ===
The 2013 Individual Speedway Polish Championship final was held on 6 October at Tarnów. Janusz Kołodziej won the Polish Championship for the third time.

Pos.	Rider	Club	Total	Points
1	Janusz Kołodziej	Unia Tarnów	13 +3	(3,3,2,2,3)
2	Krzysztof Kasprzak	Stal Gorzów Wlkp.	9 +2+2	(2,0,3,3,1)
3	Maciej Janowski	Unia Tarnów	10 +3+1	(2,2,d,3,3)
4	Patryk Dudek	Falubaz Zielona Góra	13 +0	(2,3,3,3,2)
5	Krzysztof Jabłoński	Falubaz Zielona Góra	8 +1	(2,3,3,0,0)
6	Sebastian Ułamek	Start Gniezno	9 +0	(3,1,2,1,2)
7	Piotr Protasiewicz	Falubaz Zielona Góra	8	(0,2,3,0,3)
8	Grzegorz Walasek	Stal Rzeszów	8	(1,3,1,2,1)
9	Jarosław Hampel	Falubaz Zielona Góra	8	(1,2,1,1,3)
10	Krystian Pieszczek	Wybrzeże Gdańsk	7	(3,2,0,d,2)
11	Tomasz Jędrzejak	Sparta Wrocław	7	(3,1,1,2,0)
12	Rafał Okoniewski	Stal Rzeszów	7	(0,1,2,2,2)
13	Bartosz Zmarzlik	Stal Gorzów Wlkp.	5	(0,0,2,3,0)
14	Marcin Rempała	Kolejarz Opole	3	(0,1,t,1,1)
15	Artur Mroczka	Wybrzeże Gdańsk	2	(1,0,0,t,1)
16	Damian Baliński	Unia Leszno	2	(t,u,1,1,d)
17	Karol Baran (res)	KMŻ Lublin	1	(1,0,0)

=== Golden Helmet ===
The 2013 Golden Golden Helmet (Polish: Turniej o Złoty Kask, ZK) organised by the Polish Motor Union (PZM) was the 2013 event for the league's leading riders. The final was held at Rawicz on the 25 April. Maciej Janowski won the Golden Helmet.

Pos.	Rider	Club	Total	Points
1	Maciej Janowski	Tarnów	13	(1,3,3,3,3)
2	Adrian Miedziński	Toruń	12	(2,1,3,3,3)
3	Jarosław Hampel	Zielona Góra	10 +3	(3,0,3,3,1)
4	Przemysław Pawlicki	Leszno	10 +2	(0,2,2,3,3)
5	Krzysztof Buczkowski	Bydgoszcz	10 +1	(1,3,3,0,3)
6	Krzysztof Kasprzak	Gorzów Wlkp.	9	(3,w,2,2,2)
7	Piotr Pawlicki Jr.	Leszno	8	(t,2,2,2,2)
8	Grzegorz Zengota	Leszno	7	(3,2,1,w,1)
9	Sebastian Ułamek	Gniezno	6	(0,3,1,2,0)
10	Rafał Okoniewski	Rzeszów	6	(2,3,0,t,1)
11	Mariusz Puszakowski	Rawicz	6	(2,2,0,w,2)
12	Michał Szczepaniak	Ostrów Wlkp.	6	(1,1,1,1,2)
13	Janusz Kołodziej	Tarnów	5	(2,1,1,0,1)
14	Patryk Dudek	Zielona Góra	4	(0,1,2,1,t)
15	Damian Baliński	Leszno	4	(1,1,d,2,d)
16	Tomasz Jędrzejak	Wrocław	3	(3,d,u,d,–)
17	Tobiasz Musielak	Leszno	0	(w,d,–,–,–)

=== Junior Championship ===
- winner - Patryk Dudek

=== Silver Helmet ===
- winner - Piotr Pawlicki Jr.

=== Bronze Helmet ===
- winner - Krystian Pieszczek

== Pairs ==
=== Polish Pairs Speedway Championship ===
The 2013 Polish Pairs Speedway Championship was the 2013 edition of the Polish Pairs Speedway Championship. The final was held on 30 August at Gorzów Wielkopolski.

Pos	Team	Pts	Riders
1	Tarnów	25	Janusz Kołodziej 17, Maciej Janowski 8
2	Gorzów Wlkp.	24	Krzysztof Kasprzak 14, Bartosz Zmarzlik 10
3	Wrocław	22	Tomasz Jędrzejak 10, Zbigniew Suchecki 12
4	Łódź	16	Daniel Pytel 8, Jakub Jamróg 8
5	Rzeszów	15	Dawid Lampart 6, Rafał Okoniewski 9
6	Grudziądz	15	Norbert Kościuch 7, Tomasz Chrzanowski 8
7	Gdańsk	8	Artur Mroczka 3, Robert Miśkowiak 2, Krystian Pieszczek 3

== Team ==
=== Team Speedway Polish Championship ===
The 2013 Team Speedway Polish Championship was the 2013 edition of the Team Polish Championship. ZKŻ Zielona Góra won the gold medal. The team included Jarosław Hampel, Patryk Dudek, Piotr Protasiewicz and Andreas Jonsson.

==== Ekstraliga ====
Pos	Team	P	W	D	L	Pts	BP	Total	Diff
1	Falubaz Zielona Góra	18	13	2	3	28	6	34	+133
2	Włókniarz Częstochowa	18	12	0	6	24	6	30	+75
3	Unibax Toruń	18	10	1	7	21	8	29	+103
4	Unia Tarnów	18	10	0	8	20	5	25	+42
5	Stal Gorzów Wielkopolski	18	9	2	7	20	4	24	+61
6	Unia Leszno	18	8	2	8	18	4	22	+68
7	WTS Sparta Wrocław	18	7	1	10	15	4	19	-30
8	Stal Rzeszów	18	7	1	10	15	3	18	-104
9	Polonia Bydgoszcz	18	6	0	12	12	1	13	-131
10	Start Gniezno	18	3	1	14	7	1	8	-217

Play offs

Team	Team	Team	Score
semi final	Toruń	Częstochowa	49:41, 42:47
semi final	Tarnów	Zielona Góra	47:43, 37:53
final	Toruń	Zielona Góra	46:44, 40:0

==== 1.Liga ====
Pos	Team	P	W	D	L	Diff	Pts	BP	Total
1	Wybrzeże Gdańsk	12	8	1	3	17	6	23	+50
2	GKM Grudziądz	12	8	0	4	16	4	20	+74
3	KMŻ Lublin	12	6	1	5	13	3	16	+66
4	Lokomotiv Daugavpils (Latvia)	12	5	1	6	11	4	15	+28
5	Orzeł Łódź	12	6	1	5	13	2	15	+20
6	Ostrów Wlkp.	12	6	1	5	12	2	14	-15
7	Kolejarz Rawicz	12	1	0	11	2	0	2	-223

Play offs

Pos	Team	Pts
1	Gdańsk	24
2	Grudziądz	20
3	Daugavpils	8
4	Lublin	8

==== 2.Liga ====
Pos	Team	P	W	D	L	Diff	Pts	BP	Total
1	ŻKS ROW Rybnik	8	5	1	2	11	4	15	+83
2	KSM Krosno	8	5	0	3	10	1	11	-43
3	Wanda Kraków	8	4	0	4	8	2	10	+6
4	Kolejarz Opole	8	3	1	4	7	2	9	0
5	Polonia Piła	8	2	0	6	4	1	5	-45

Play offs

Pos	Team	Pts
1	Rybnik	21
2	Kraków	16
3	Opole	13
4	Krosno	10
