= 2009 Polish speedway season =

Motorcycle racing competition

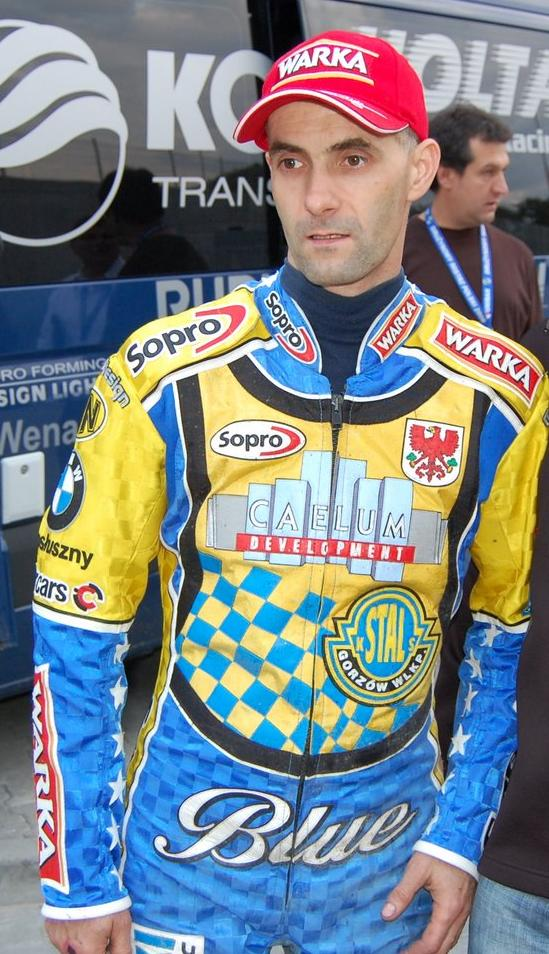
- Tomasz Gollob won his eighth Polish title

The 2009 Polish Speedway season was the 2009 season of motorcycle speedway in Poland.

== Individual ==
=== Silver Helmet ===
- winner - Grzegorz Zengota

=== Bronze Helmet ===
- winner - Maciej Janowski

== Team ==
=== Team Speedway Polish Championship ===
The 2009 Team Speedway Polish Championship was the 2009 edition of the Team Polish Championship. ZKŻ Zielona Góra won the gold medal.

==== Ekstraliga ====
The 2009 Ekstraliga (known as the CenterNet Mobile Speedway Ekstraliga for sponsorship reasons) was the 10th Ekstraliga season.

Team	Pld	W	D	L	Pts	Bon	Total	PD
Unibax Toruń	14	11	0	3	22	5	27	+39
Falubaz Zielona Góra	14	8	0	6	16	6	22	+137
Cognor Włókniarz Cz-wa	14	8	1	5	17	4	21	-6
Unia Leszno	14	6	2	6	14	5	19	+60
Caelum Stal Gorzów	14	8	0	6	16	3	19	-1
Polonia Bydgoszcz	14	5	1	8	11	-	11	-90
Lotos Wybrzeże Gdańsk	14	4	0	10	8	2	10	-74
Atlas Wrocław	14	4	0	10	8	1	9	-65

	BYD	CZE	GDA	GOR	LES	TOR	WRO	ZIE
Bydgoszcz	—	46:38	57:33	47:43	45:45	39:51	47:43	47:43
Częstochowa	50:40	—	53:37	43:47	45:45	50:40	52:38	50:40
Gdańsk	57:33	60:30	—	44:46	49:41	41:49	50:40	39:51
Gorzów Wlkp.	59:31	39:51	55:35	—	49:41	44:45	52:38	49:41
Leszno	49:41	42:48	51:39	61:29	—	62:28	49:41	47:43
Toruń	56:34	53:37	54:36	50:40	48:42	—	54:36	52:38
Wrocław	51:39	43:45	49:41	40:50	49:41	44:46	—	47:43
Zielona Góra	54:36	59:31	58:32	63:27	46:44	67:23	52:37	—

Playoffs

Quarterfinals
16 and 30 August
1	Toruń	45	48	94
6	Bydgoszcz	45	41	86
16 and 30 August
2	Zielona Góra	46	47	93
5	Gorzów Wlkp.	44	43	87
16 and 30 August
3	Częstochowa	53	45	98
4	Leszno	37	45	82

Semifinals
6 and 13 September
W1	Zielona Góra	39	57	96
L1	Bydgoszcz	51	32	83
6 and 13 September
W2	Toruń	44	51	95
W3	Częstochowa	46	39	85

Finals
24 and 25 October
Zielona Góra	48	40	88
Toruń	42	38	80
Bronze medal matches
27 September and 4 October
Bydgoszcz	46	37	83
Częstochowa	44	53	97

Seventh place
6 and 13 September
7	Gdańsk	39	42	81
8	Wrocław	51	48	99

==== 1.Liga ====
The 2009 First League was the second division of the Team Speedway Polish Championship.

Team	Pld	W	D	L	Pts	Bon	Total	PD
Unia Tarnów	14	12	0	2	24	7	31	+286
Stal Rzeszów	14	8	0	6	16	5	21	+10
Lokomotiv Daugavpils (Latvia)	14	9	0	5	18	3	21	+18
Start Gniezno	14	6	0	8	12	4	16	-23
PSŻ Poznań	14	6	0	8	12	3	15	-114
RKM ROW Rybnik	14	6	0	8	12	3	15	-72
GTŻ Grudziądz	14	5	0	9	10	1	11	-94
Ostrów Wlkp.	14	3	0	11	6	2	8	-91

	DAU	GNI	GRU	OST	POZ	RYB	RZE	TAR
Daugavpils	—	50:43	55:37	54:37	60:30	59:34	63:28	48:42
Gniezno	53:37	—	57:34	52:38	67:25	44:46	55:35	30:20
Grudziądz	46:47	53:37	—	45:44	54:38	48:45	55:35	42:51
Ostrów Wlkp.	60:27	wo^{a}	51:41	—	57:36	44:45	40:53	34:57
Poznań	53:38	48:42	58:34	53:28^{b}	—	49:41	41:48	33:59
Rybnik	40:50	62:31	58:34	50:42	42:48	—	48:44	31:59
Rzeszów	64:28	56:34	50:40	48:42	55:37	55:38	—	38:55
Tarnów	61:30	57:33	62:31	55:38	60:32	68:23	57:34	—

Notes:

a. Match between Ostrów and Gniezno - both walkover, both teams (0 match points, 0:40 in heat points, 0 bonus point)
b. Match results between Poznań and Ostrów was changed by Main Commission of Speedway Sport from 53:38 to 53:28 - 10 points scored by Robert Miśkowiak was cancelled, because he was unauthorized to start in this match (he was resting after the Individual European Championship Semi-Final, which was one day before this meeting)

Playoffs

Quarterfinals
9 and 16 August
1	Tarnów	54	58	112
6	Rybnik	37	34	71
9 and 16 August
2	Rzeszów	47	61	108
5	Poznań	43	30	73
9 and 16 August
3	Daugavpils	41	56	97
4	Gniezno	52	37	89

Semifinals
30 Aug and 6 Sep
W1	Tarnów	51	57	108
L1	Gniezno	41	35	76
30 Aug and 6 Sep
W2	Rzeszów	27	60	87
W3	Daugavpils	63	31	94

Finals
13 and 27 September
Tarnów	53	61	114
Daugavpils	37	30	67
Bronze medal matches
13 and 27 September
Rzeszów	42	61	103
Gniezno	48	32	80

==== 2.Liga ====
The 2009 Second League was the third division of the Team Speedway Polish Championship.

Team	Pld	W	D	L	Pts	Bon	Total	PD
Orzeł Łódź	12	89	1	2	19	6	25	+166
Speedway Miskolc (Hungary)	12	6	1	4	13	4	17	+68
KMŻ Lublin	12	6	0	6	12	4	16	+20
KSM Krosno	12	6	0	6	12	3	15	+24
Kolejarz Opole	12	5	1	6	11	3	14	-50
Speedway Polonia Piła	12	4	1	7	9	1	10	-81
Kolejarz Rawicz	12	4	0	5	8	-	8	-147

	KRO	LUB	ŁÓD	MIS	OPO	PIŁ	RAW
Krosno	—	52:40	50:40	47:43	55:36	61:31	62:28
Lublin	53:37	—	38:52	63:29	51:42	55:36	61:31
Łódź	54:36	59:34	—	61:31	61:32	62:28	58:35
Miskolc	63:30	55:37	44:46	—	61:31	56:37	63:26
Opole	50:39	54:36	45:44	46:46	—	51:40	51:39
Piła	47:43	43:47	45:45	50:40	49:42	—	53:37
Rawicz	46:43	47:42	44:46	39:50	51:42	47:46	—

Playoffs

Quarterfinals
9 and 16 August
1	Łódź	59	69	128
6	Piła	32	20	52
9 and 16 August
2	Miskolc	43	63	106
5	Opole	47	27	74
9 and 16 August
3	Lublin	44	57	101
4	Krosno	48	36	84

Semifinals
30 August and 6 September
W1	Łódź	64	55	119
L1	Krosno	26	37	65
30 August and 6 September
W2	Miskolc	55	43	98
W3	Lublin	37	47	84

Finals
13 and 27 September
Łódź	40	49	89
Miskolc	50	44	94
Bronze medal matches
13 and 27 September
Lublin	23	45	68
Krosno	37	45	82
