= 2011 Polish speedway season =

Motorcycle racing competition

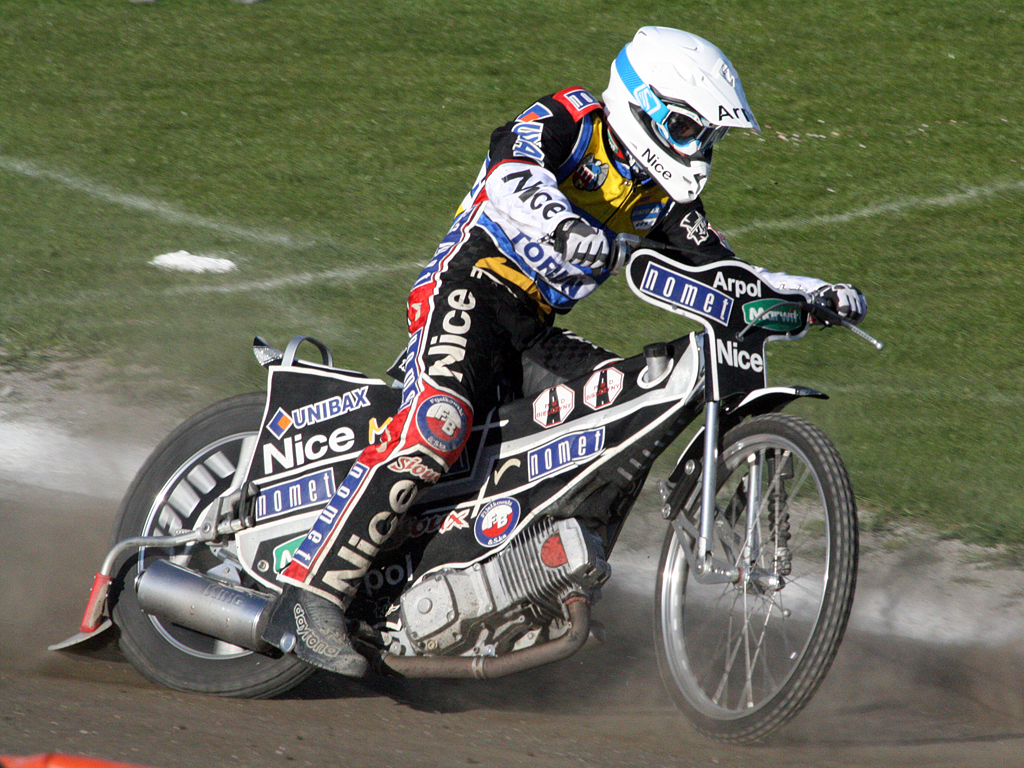
- Adrian Miedziński won the Golden Helmet

The 2011 Polish Speedway season was the 2011 season of motorcycle speedway in Poland.

== Individual ==
=== Polish Individual Speedway Championship ===
The 2011 Individual Speedway Polish Championship final was held on 3 September at Leszno. Jarosław Hampel won the Polish Championship for the first time.

Pos.	Rider	Club	Total	Points
1	Jarosław Hampel	Leszno	15	(3,3,3,3,3)
2	Przemysław Pawlicki	Piła	11 +3	(2,1,3,3,2)
3	Piotr Protasiewicz	Zielona Góra	11 +2	(2,3,3,1,2)
4	Grzegorz Walasek	Bydgoszcz	11 +1	(3,3,2,3,w)
5	Piotr Pawlicki Jr.	Piła	9	(3,w,3,0,3)
6	Tomasz Gapiński	Bydgoszcz	9	(1,3,2,w,3)
7	Maciej Janowski	Wrocław	9	(3,2,d,2,2)
8	Patryk Dudek	Zielona Góra	9	(1,2,1,2,3)
9	Adam Skórnicki	Leszno	8	(2,1,2,1,2)
10	Krzysztof Jabłoński	Gniezno	6	(0,1,1,3,1)
11	Maciej Kuciapa	Rzeszów	6	(1,1,2,1,1)
12	Michał Szczepaniak	Gniezno	5	(1,0,1,2,1)
13	Sebastian Ułamek	Tarnów	4	(2,0,1,0,1)
14	Marcin Jędrzejewski	Opole	2	(0,2,d,–,–)
15	Szymon Kiełbasa	Rawicz	0	(0,u/ns,w,–,–)
16	Mateusz Szczepaniak	Łódź	0	(d,–,–,–,–)
17	Tobiasz Musielak (res)	Leszno	4	(2,0,0,2,0)

=== Golden Helmet ===
The 2011 Golden Golden Helmet (Polish: Turniej o Złoty Kask, ZK) organised by the Polish Motor Union (PZM) was the 2011 event for the league's leading riders. The final was held at Toruń on the 24 April. Adrian Miedziński won the Golden Helmet.

Pos.	Rider	Club	Total	Points
1	Adrian Miedziński	Toruń	13 +3	(2,3,3,3,2)
2	Piotr Protasiewicz	Zielona Góra	13 +2	(3,3,3,3,1)
3	Janusz Kolodziej	Leszno	12	(3,2,3,2,2)
4	Tomasz Chrzanowski	Grudziądz	10	(3,1,2,1,3)
5	Jarosław Hampel	Leszno	9	(2,3,t,1,3)
6	Grzegorz Walasek	Bydgoszcz	8	(0,0,3,2,3)
7	Maciej Janowski	Wrocław	8	(1,3,1,3,0)
8	Krzysztof Jabłoński	Gniezno	8	(1,0,1,3,3)
9	Mateusz Szczepaniak	Łódź	8	(2,1,2,2,1)
10	Krzysztof Kasprzak	Tarnów	7	(1,2,2,2,0)
11	Krzysztof Buczkowski	Grudziądz	5	(3,1,0,1,d)
12	Sebastian Ułamek	Tarnów	5	(2,1,0,0,2)
13	Michał Szczepaniak	Gniezno	5	(1,2,1,d,1)
14	Jacek Rempała	Łódź	4	(0,0,2,0,2)
15	Michał Mitko	Opole	4	(0,2,1,1,0)
16	Łukasz Jankowski	Łódź	1	(0,0,d,d,1)

=== Criterium of Aces ===
The Mieczysław Połukard Criterium of Aces was won by Emil Saifutdinov.

=== Junior Championship ===
- winner - Piotr Pawlicki Jr.

=== Silver Helmet ===
- winner - Maciej Janowski

=== Bronze Helmet ===
- winner - Patryk Dudek

== Pairs ==
=== Polish Pairs Speedway Championship ===
The 2011 Polish Pairs Speedway Championship was the 2011 edition of the Polish Pairs Speedway Championship. The final was held on 22 June at Zielona Góra.

Pos	Team	Pts	Riders
1	Wrocław	25	Piotr Świderski 14, Tomasz Jędrzejak 10, Maciej Janowski 1
2	Zielona Góra	22	Piotr Protasiewicz 13, Patryk Dudek 9
3	Poznań	19	Norbert Kościuch 9, Robert Miśkowiak 10
4	Tarnów	18	Sebastian Ułamek 9, Krzysztof Kasprzak 9
5	Bydgoszcz	16	Grzegorz Walasek 11, Tomasz Gapiński 0, Robert Kościecha 5
6	Rzeszów	13	Rafał Okoniewski 6, Maciej Kuciapa 5, Dawid Lampart 2
7	Łódź	12	Mateusz Szczepaniak 5, Daniel Jeleniewski 5, Łukasz Jankowski 2

== Team ==
=== Team Speedway Polish Championship ===
The 2011 Team Speedway Polish Championship was the 2011 edition of the Team Polish Championship. ZKŻ Zielona Góra won the gold medal.

==== Ekstraliga ====
Pos	Team	Pts	W	D	L	BP	Diff
1	Unibax Toruń	29	11	1	2	6	+77
2	Falubaz Zielona Góra	26	10	1	3	5	+115
3	Stal Gorzów	23	8	0	6	7	+58
4	Unia Leszno	23	9	1	4	4	+61
5	Rzeszów	12	4	2	8	2	–51
6	WTS Sparta Wrocław	11	4	1	9	2	–44
7	unia Tarnów	8	3	0	11	2	–102
8	Włókniarz Częstochowa	8	4	0	10	0	–114

Play offs

Team	Team	Team	Score
quarter final	Toruń	Wrocław	58:32, 40:0
quarter final	Zielona Góra	Rzeszów	59:31, 60:30
quarter final	Gorzów	Leszno	51:39, 56:33
semi final	Toruń	Leszno	36:53, 49:41
semi final	Zielona Góra	Gorzów	19:27, 54:36
final	Zielona Góra	Leszno	43:47, 52:38

==== 1.Liga ====
Pos	Team	Pts	W	D	L	BP	Diff
1	Polonia Bydgoszcz	29	11	0	3	7	+219
2	Start Gniezno	25	10	0	4	5	+104
3	GTŻ Grudziądz	25	10	0	4	5	+120
4	Wybrzeże Gdańsk	22	9	0	5	4	+150
5	Lokomotiv Daugavpils (Latvia)	13	5	0	9	3	–8
6	RKM ROW Rybnik	11	4	0	10	3	–194
7	Orzeł Łódź	11	5	0	9	1	–210
8	PSŻ Poznań	4	2	0	12	0	–281

Pos	Team	Pts
1	Polonia Bydgoszcz	23
2	Wybrzeże Gdańsk	15
3	Start Gniezno	13
4	GTŻ Grudziądz	9

==== 2.Liga ====
Pos	Team	Pts	W	D	L	BP	Diff
1	Polonia Piła	28	11	0	3	6	+189
2	KMŻ Lublin	27	10	1	3	6	+129
3	Ostrów Wlkp.	26	10	0	4	6	+174
4	Kolejarz Opole	20	8	0	6	4	+51
5	Wanda Kraków	12	5	0	9	2	–125
6	Rivne Speedway (Ukraine)	10	4	0	10	2	–84
7	Kolejarz Rawicz	9	4	0	10	1	–25
8	KSM Krosno	8	3	1	10	1	–309
9	Speedway Miskolc (Hungary)	withdrew					
