= Zbigniew Podlecki Stadium =

Stadium in Gdańsk, Poland

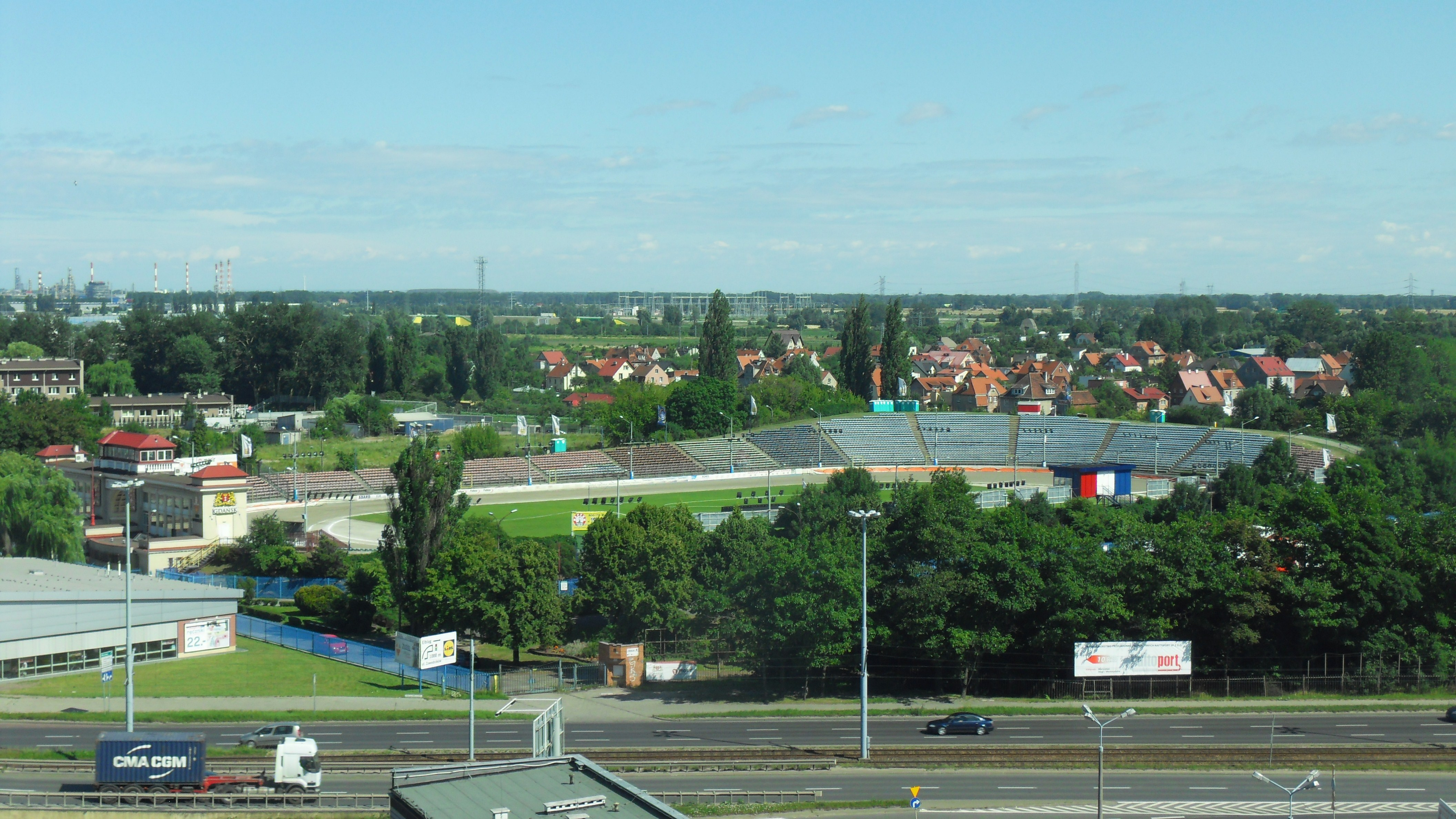
- Location: Zawodników 1, 80-980 Zawodników, Gdańsk, Poland
- Coordinates: 54°20′46″N 18°40′18″E
- Capacity: 10,000
- Operator: Wybrzeże Gdańsk
- Opened: 8 May 1925
- Former names: Kampfbahn Niederstadt
- Major events: Motorcycle speedway
- Length: 349 m (0.217 mi)

The Zbigniew Podlecki Stadium (Polish: Stadion im. Zbigniewa Podleckiego), formerly the Coast Stadium (Polish: Stadion Wybrzeże), is a 10,000-capacity motorcycle speedway stadium on the eastern outskirts of Gdańsk in Poland.

The venue is used by the speedway team Wybrzeże Gdańsk, who compete in the Team Speedway Polish Championship. It also hosts football (90 x 50 metres), concerts, shows, festivals, recreational and integration events. There is a mini speedway track next to the stadium.

== History ==
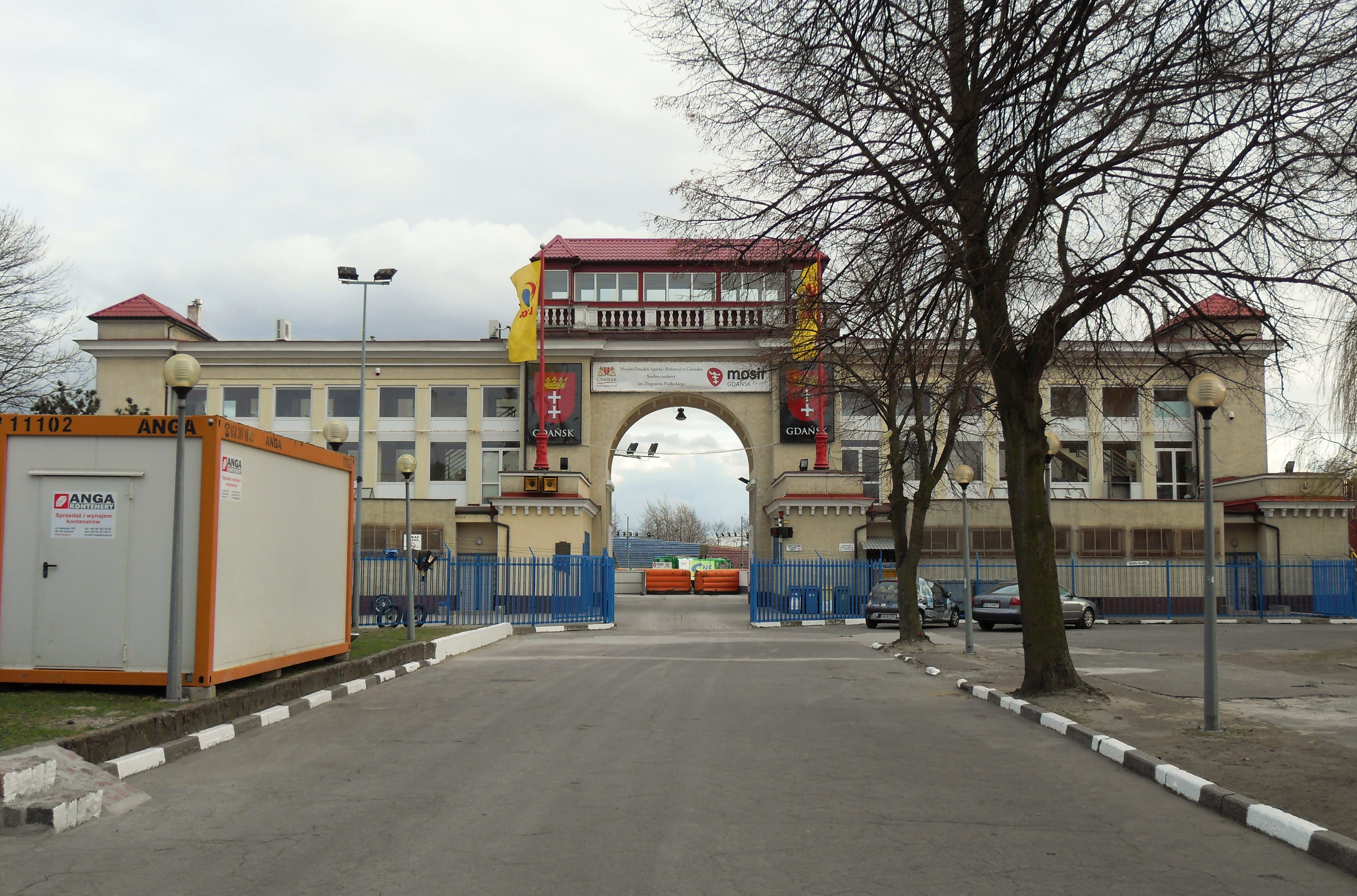
The Marathon Gate in 2012

The stadium opened on 8 May 1925 as part of the Free City of Danzig and was built on the site of former fortifications. It was commissioned by Germans taking the name Kampfbahn Niederstadt. When it was first used it was mainly for football and also contained an athletics track. After World War II the stands were enlarged and the Marathon Gate was built. The speedway track was opened on 11 April 1965 and underwent improvements before the 1988 season, with white granite replacing the existing track base.

In 2009, the stadium was named after the Polish speedway rider Zbigniew Podlecki, who rode for the club from 1958 to 1972.

In recent years the stadium has undergone various renovation to meet FIM standards. On 21 August 2011, Australian Darcy Ward, set a new track record of 61.28.
