= Damian Dróżdż =

Polish speedway rider

- Born: 20 December 1996 (age 29); Częstochowa, Poland
- Nationality: Polish

Career history

Poland
- 2013-2014: Opole
- 2015: Gniezno
- 2015-2018: Wrocław
- 2016, 2019: Częstochowa
- 2020: Krosno
- 2020-2023: Rawicz

Great Britain
- 2018: Belle Vue Aces

Damian Dróżdż (born 20 December 1996) is a motorcycle speedway rider from Poland.

== Career ==
Dróżdż rode in the top tier of British Speedway, riding for the Belle Vue Aces in the SGB Premiership 2018.

Dróżdż rode in Poland for Kolejarz Rawicz from 2020 to 2023.
