= 2012 Polish speedway season =

Motorcycle racing competition

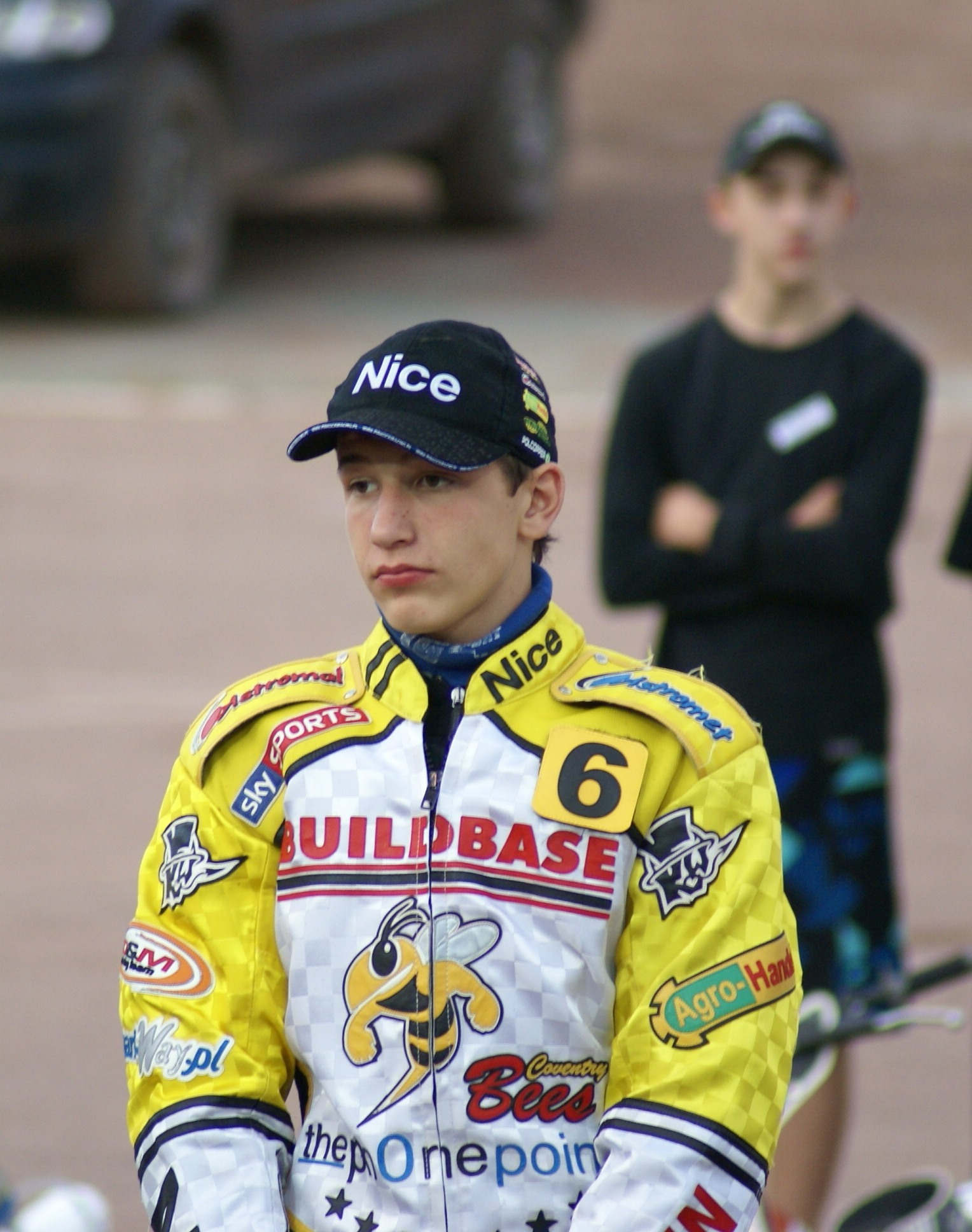
- Piotr Pawlicki, 2012 Golden Helmet winner

The 2012 Polish Speedway season was the 2012 season of motorcycle speedway in Poland.

== Individual ==
=== Polish Individual Speedway Championship ===
The 2012 Individual Speedway Polish Championship final was held on 15 August at Zielona Góra. Tomasz Jędrzejak won the Polish Championship.

Pos.	Rider	Club	Total	Points
1	Tomasz Jędrzejak	Sparta Wrocław	14	(3,3,2,3,3)
2	Rafał Okoniewski	Stal Rzeszów	11 +3	(3,3,1,3,1)
3	Krzysztof Buczkowski	Polonia Bydgoszcz	11 +2	(3,3,0,3,2)
4	Bartosz Zmarzlik	Gorzów	10	(1,3,3,0,3)
5	Grzegorz Zengota	Włókniarz Częstochowa	10	(3,2,2,2,1)
6	Piotr Protasiewicz	Falubaz Zielona Góra	10	(1,2,3,2,2)
7	Maciej Janowski	Unia Tarnów	10	(2,2,3,1,2)
8	Adrian Miedziński	Unibax Toruń	9	(2,1,d,3,3)
9	Dawid Stachyra	KMŻ Lublin	9	(2,1,3,0,3)
10	Patryk Dudek	Falubaz Zielona Góra	8	(2,w,2,2,2)
11	Krzysztof Kasprzak	Gorzów	4	(1,0,2,1,d)
12	Mirosław Jabłoński	Włókniarz Częstochowa	4	(0,1,1,1,1)
13	Krzysztof Jabłoński	Falubaz Zielona Góra	3	(d,2,1,u/–,–)
14	Robert Miśkowiak (res)	KMŻ Lublin	3	(2,1,w)
15	Damian Adamczak	Orzeł Łódź	3	(1,0,1,1,0)
16	Sławomir Musielak	Kolejarz Rawicz	1	(0,1,0,w,–)
17	Tomasz Chrzanowski	Wybrzeże Gdańsk	0	(0,0,0,0,d)

=== Golden Helmet ===
The 2012 Golden Golden Helmet (Polish: Turniej o Złoty Kask, ZK) organised by the Polish Motor Union (PZM) was the 2012 event for the league's leading riders. The final was held at Gorzów Wielkopolski on the 5 May. Piotr Pawlicki Jr. won the Golden Helmet.

Pos.	Rider	Club	Total	Points
1	Piotr Pawlicki Jr.	Leszno	12 +3	(2,2,3,2,3)
2	Grzegorz Zengota	Częstochowa	12 +2	(3,2,3,3,1)
3	Przemysław Pawlicki	Leszno	11 +3	(1,3,1,3,3)
4	Krzysztof Kasprzak	Gorzów	11 +2	(3,3,1,2,2)
5	Rafał Okoniewski	Rzeszów	11 +1	(2,3,2,1,3)
6	Piotr Protasiewicz	Zielona Góra	11 +0	(3,2,3,3,0)
7	Patryk Dudek	Zielona Góra	10	(3,2,1,2,2)
8	Krzysztof Buczkowski	Bydgoszcz	10	(2,3,2,1,2)
9	Grzegorz Walasek	Rzeszów	7	(2,1,0,3,1)
10	Dawid Stachyra	Lublin	6	(0,1,3,2,0)
11	Sebastian Ułamek	Wrocław	5	(0,1,2,1,1)
12	Mirosław Jabłoński	Częstochowa	5	(1,1,1,0,2)
13	Łukasz Jankowski	Zielona Góra	4	(1,0,d,0,3)
14	Rune Holta	Zielona Góra	3	(1,0,0,1,1)
15	Daniel Jeleniewski	Lublin	2	(0,d,2,0,0)
16	Robert Miśkowiak	Lublin	0	(w,0,0,0,0)

=== Criterium of Aces ===
The Mieczysław Połukard Criterium of Aces was won by Darcy Ward.

=== Junior Championship ===
- winner - Maciej Janowski

=== Silver Helmet ===
- winner - Przemysław Pawlicki

=== Bronze Helmet ===
- winner - Krystian Pieszczek

== Pairs ==
=== Polish Pairs Speedway Championship ===
The 2012 Polish Pairs Speedway Championship was the 2012 edition of the Polish Pairs Speedway Championship. The final was held on 7 September at Leszno.

Pos	Team	Pts	Riders
1	Leszno	26	Przemysław Pawlicki 16, Damian Baliński 10, Piotr Pawlicki Jr. 0
2	Zielona Góra	25	Łukasz Jankowski 14, Krzysztof Jabłoński 11
3	Grudziądz	19	Norbert Kościuch 13, Paweł Staszek 6
4	Rzeszów	18	Grzegorz Walasek 9, Rafał Okoniewski 9
5	Piła	18	Mariusz Puszakowski 9, Marcin Jędrzejewski 9
6	Lublin	13	Dawid Stachyra 10, Karol Baran 1, Robert Miśkowiak 2
7	Łódź	7	Michał Szczepaniak 4, Mateusz Szczepaniak 3, Marcin Wawrzyniak 0

== Team ==
=== Team Speedway Polish Championship ===
The 2012 Team Speedway Polish Championship was the 2012 edition of the Team Polish Championship. Unia Tarnów, led by American rider Greg Hancock, won the gold medal.

==== Ekstraliga ====
Pos	Team	P	Pts	W	D	L	BP	Diff
1	Unia Tarnów	18	37	14	1	3	8	+195
2	Stal Gorzów Wielkopolski	18	33	12	1	5	8	+189
3	Falubaz Zielona Góra	18	30	10	3	5	7	+59
4	Unibax Toruń	18	27	10	1	7	6	+108
5	Unia Leszno	18	26	9	3	6	5	+1
6	Polonia Bydgoszcz	18	19	8	1	9	2	–17
7	Stal Rzeszów	18	17	6	2	10	3	–82
8	Włókniarz Częstochowa	18	14	4	2	12	4	–115
9	WTS Sparta Wrocław	18	12	5	1	12	1	–148
10	Wybrzeże Gdańsk	18	10	4	1	13	1	–190

Play offs

Team	Team	Team	Score
semi final	Tarnów	Toruń	48:42, 45:45
semi final	Gorzów	Zielona Góra	45:45, 56:34
final	Tarnów	Gorzów	42:47, 51:39

==== 1.Liga ====
Pos	Team	P	Pts	W	D	L	BP	Diff
1	Start Gniezno	10	17	6	1	3	4	+37
2	KMŻ Lublin	10	15	5	0	5	5	+50
3	GTŻ Grudziądz	10	13	5	1	4	2	+28
4	Lokomotiv Daugavpils (Latvia)	10	11	5	0	5	1	–20
5	Orzeł Łódź	10	10	4	0	6	2	+5
6	Ostrów Wlkp.	10	9	4	0	6	1	–100

Play offs

Pos	Team	Pts
1	Gniezno	28
2	Grudziądz	24
3	Lublin	23
4	Daugavpils	11

==== 2.Liga ====
Pos	Team	P	Pts	W	D	L	BP	Diff
1	Polonia Piła	9	12	5	0	4	2	–29
2	Wanda Kraków	9	12	5	0	4	2	–1
3	ROW Rybnik	9	11	4	0	5	3	+17
4	Kolejarz Rawicz	9	11	5	0	4	1	+9
5	Kolejarz Opole	9	8	3	0	6	2	+9
6	KSM Krosno	5	6	3	0	2	0	–5

Play offs

Team	Team	Team	Score
semi final	Rawicz	Opole	39:51, 52:36
semi final	Piła	Rybnik	33:57, 50:40
final	Rybnik	Rawicz	28:62, 54:36
