= Krystian Pieszczek =

Polish speedway rider (born 1995)

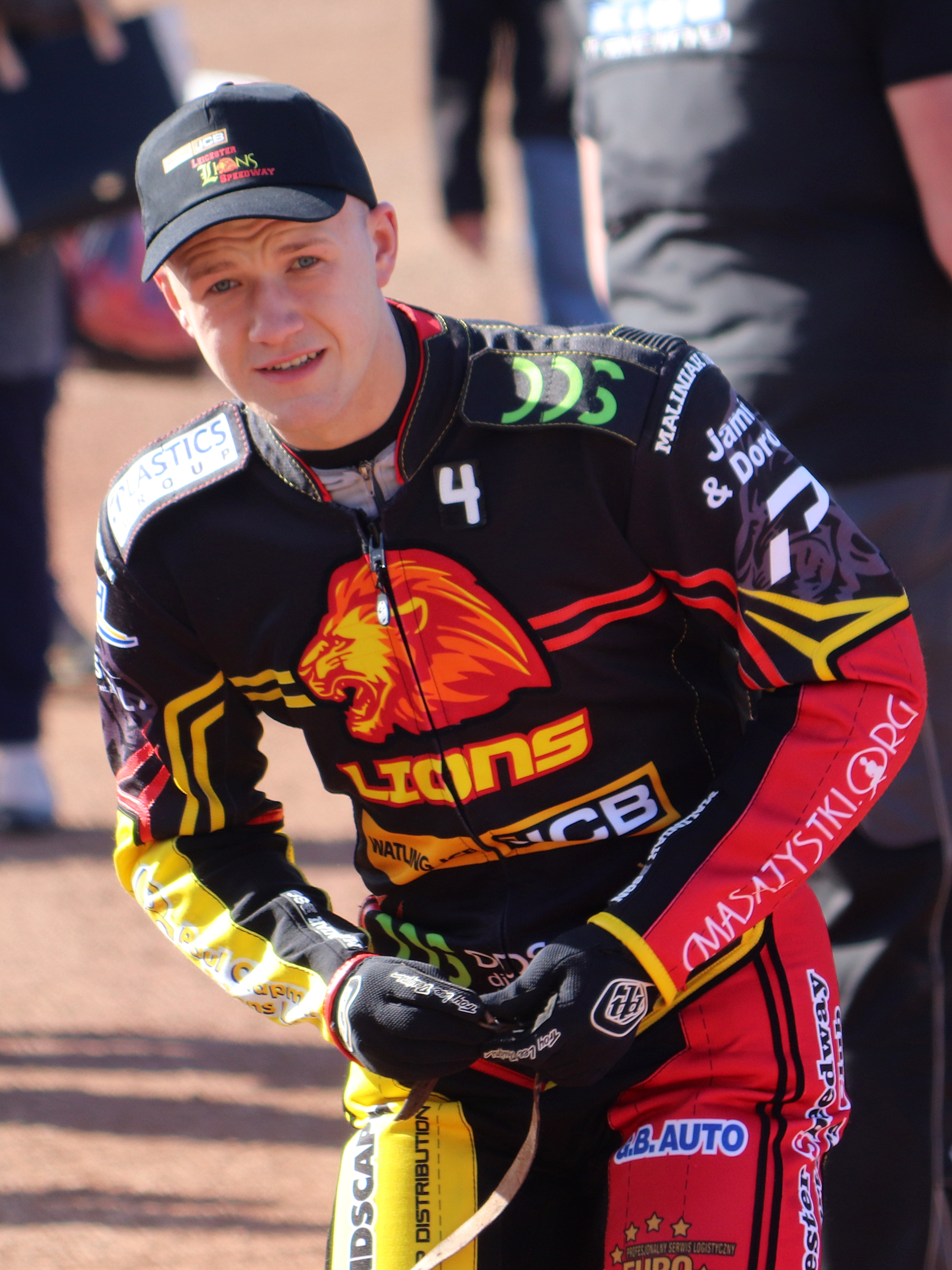
- Born: 25 September 1995 (age 31); Gdańsk, Poland
- Nickname: Krycha
- Nationality: Polish
- Website: official website

Career history

Poland
- 2011–2014, 2019, 2021, 2025: Gdańsk
- 2013: Krosno
- 2015–2016: Zielona Góra
- 2017–2018, 2020: Grudziądz
- 2022-2023: Rybnik
- 2024: Rzeszów

Sweden
- 2017: Lejonen
- 2019: Indianerna

Great Britain
- 2018: Leicester Lions
- 2019: Ipswich Witches

Denmark
- 2013–2014: Outrup/Varde
- 2015–2017: Grindsted

Individual honours
- 2012, 2013: Bronze Helmet
- 2016: Silver Helmet
- 2016: Ekstraliga Riders Champion

Team honours
- 2013, 2014: European Junior Championship
- 2016: Under-21 World Cup
- 2016: Speedway World Cup

Kristian Pieszczek (born 23 September 1995) is a Polish speedway rider.

== Career ==
Born in Gdańsk, Pieszczek first had success as a junior in 2007. He made his Polish league debut in 2011 for Wybrzeże Gdańsk, going on to ride for the club in the Ekstraliga in 2012. He won the Bronze Helmet in 2012 and 2013, and in 2013 was also part of the victorious Polish team in the European Junior Championships. In 2015 he moved to Falubaz Zielona Góra.

After finishing seventh in 2014, in 2016, Pieszczek finished runner-up (to Max Fricke) in the World Under-21 Championship, won the Silver Helmet competition, and finished fourth in the Polish Individual Speedway Championship. He was also part of the Polish team that won the 2016 Speedway World Cup.

Pieszczek rode for GKM Grudziądz in Poland and Lejonen in the Swedish Elitserien in 2017, but after a disappointing season he embarked on an intensive training regime over the winter of 2017/18.

For the 2018 season, Pieszczek stayed with Grudziądz in Poland and signed for Leicester Lions in the British SGB Premiership.

In 2019, Pieszczek signed for Ipswich Witches.
