= Mirosław Korbel =

Polish speedway rider

- Born: 31 January 1963 (age 63); Rydułtowy, Poland
- Nationality: Polish

Career history

Poland
- 1983–1994, 1996–1998: Rybnik
- 1995: Piła
- 1999: Kraków
- 2000–2002: Świętochłowice

Individual honours
- 1990: Polish championship silver
- 1990: Golden Helmet winner

Mirosław Korbel (born 31 January 1963) is a former motorcycle speedway rider from Poland. Since retiring he has been a team coach for Kolejarz Opole.

== Career ==
Korbel won the gold medal in the prestigious Golden Helmet during the 1990 Polish speedway season. During the same season, he won the silver medal at the Polish Individual Speedway Championship behind Zenon Kasprzak.

Korbel spent the majority of his career riding for Rybnik, where he won three medals at the Polish league championships (two silver and one bronze).

In 1987, Korbel toured the United Kingdom with the Polish team.

Korbel competed in the 1988 Individual Speedway World Championship qualifying, winning the first Continental round and reaching the Continental Speedway Final.
