= Wojciech Załuski (speedway rider) =

Polish speedway rider

- Born: 22 February 1963 (age 63); Opole, Poland
- Nationality: Polish

Career history

Poland
- 1981–1991, 1999–2002: Kolejarz Opole
- 1992–1996: WTS Sparta Wrocław
- 1997–1998: Wybrzeże Gdańsk

Individual honours
- 1989: Polish Champion
- 1984: Polish Junior Champion
- 1989: Poland Golden Helmet Winner
- 1983: Poland Silver Helmet Winner

Team honours
- 1993, 1994, 1995: Polish League Champion

Wojciech Załuski (born 22 February 1963) is a former motorcycle speedway rider from Poland. He was the 1989 Polish champion.

== Career ==
Załuski came to prominence in 1984, when he won the Polish Junior Individual Speedway Championship.

Załuski became the champion of Poland after he won gold at the Polish Individual Speedway Championship in 1989. He also won the prestigious Golden Helmet during the 1989 Polish speedway season.

Załuski rode for his home club of Kolejarz Opole from 1981 to 1991. During 1991, he represented Poland in the 1991 Speedway World Pairs Championship.

Załuski joined Sparta Wrocław for five seasons from 1992 to 1997 and won the Team Speedway Polish Championship on three occasions. He then joined Wybrzeże Gdańsk for two seasons before returning to Opole in 1999, where he saw out the end of his career in 2002.

== World final appearances ==
=== World Pairs ===
- 1991 - (Poland) Poznań, Golęcin Speedway Stadium (with Ryszard Dołomisiewicz & Piotr Świst - 7th - 9pts (1)
