= Ryszard Dołomisiewicz =

Polish speedway rider

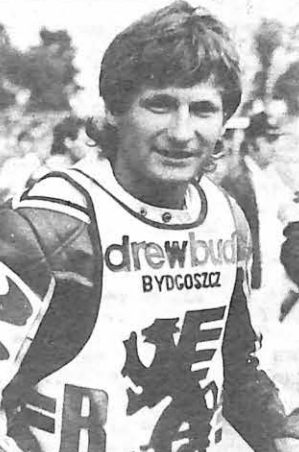
- Born: 1 February 1966 (age 60); Tarnogród, Poland
- Nationality: Polish

Career history
- 1982-1991: Polonia Bydgoszcz

Individual honours
- 1986: Speedway World Championship finalist
- 1986: U-21 Polish Champion
- 1984, 1986, 1987: Poland Silver Helmet Winner
- 1984: Poland Bronze Helmet Winner

Ryszard Dołomisiewicz (born 1 February 1966) is a former international speedway rider from Poland.

== Speedway career ==
Dołomisiewicz reached the final of the Speedway World Championship in the 1986 Individual Speedway World Championship.

In 1987, Dołomisiewicz toured the United Kingdom with the Polish team. and he rode in the top tier of Polish Speedway from 1982 to 1991, riding for Polonia Bydgoszcz.

After he retired from speedway, Dołomisiewicz worked as a team manager at Polonia Piła.

== World final appearances ==
=== Individual World Championship ===
- 1986 - (Poland) Chorzów, Silesian Stadium - 11th - 6pts

=== World Pairs Championship ===
- 1991 - (Poland) Poznań, Olimpia Poznań Stadium (with Piotr Świst / Wojciech Załuski) - 7th - 9pts
