= Wybrzeże Gdańsk =

Polish motorcycle speedway team

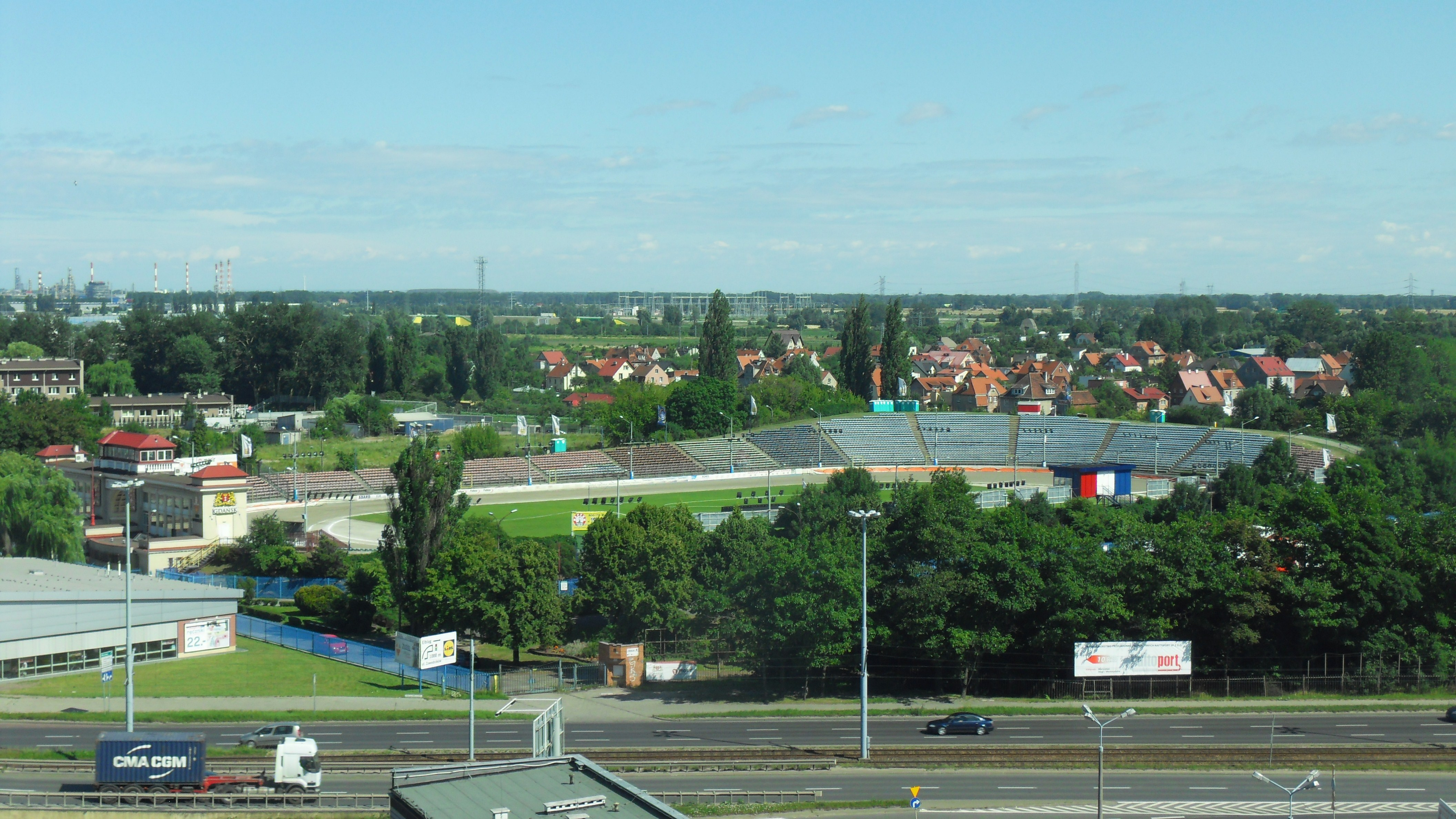

Club information
- Track address: Zbigniew Podlecki Stadium
- Country: Poland
- Founded: 1945 / 2006
- Team manager: Eryk Jóźwiak
- League: National League
- Website: Official website

Club facts
- Colours: Red, White and Blue
- Track size: 349 m
- Track record time: 61.28 seconds
- Track record date: 21 August 2011
- Track record holder: Darcy Ward

Major team honours
Team Championship silver medal	1960, 1967, 1978, 1985
Team Championship bronze medal	1965, 1999
Polish Pairs Speedway Championship	1985

Wybrzeże Gdańsk is a Polish motorcycle speedway team, which competes in the National League (speedway 3rd division) Previously it was a multi-sports club.

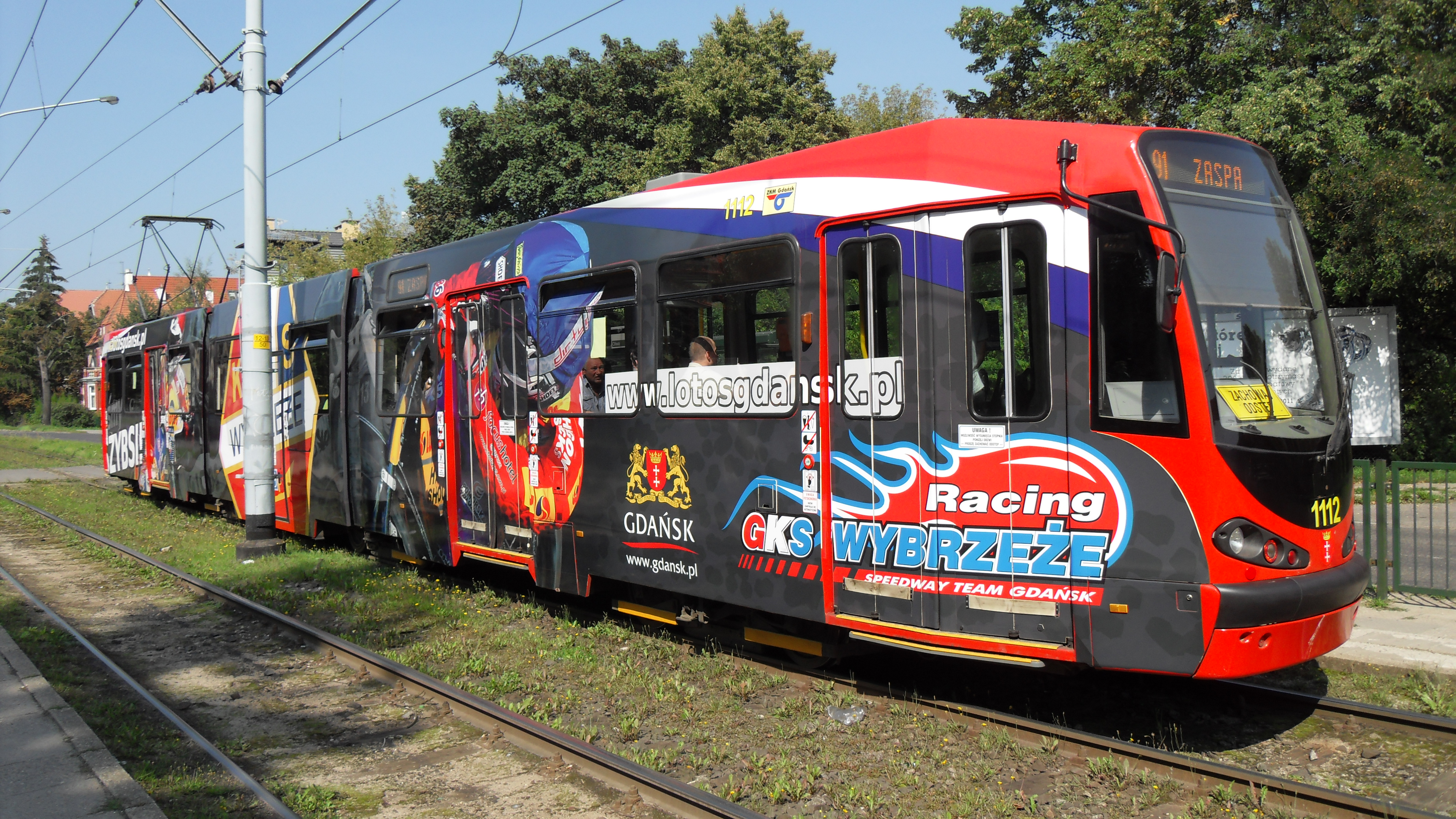
Gdańsk tram in the club colors of Wybrzeże Gdańsk in 2011

== History ==
=== 1948 to 1999 ===
The club competed in the inaugural 1948 Polish speedway season, under the name of GKM Gdańsk. The following year the name changed to Związkowiec Gdańsk and competed until 1950. Speedway returned to Gdańsk in 1957 under the name of LPŻ Gdańsk (1957–1959) and Legia Gdańsk from 1960.

Legia won a silver medal in the Team Speedway Polish Championship in 1960 and their star rider Marian Kaiser also became the Polish champion after winning the Polish Individual Speedway Championship in 1960. Kaiser went on to win the Golden Helmet in 1962, when the club referred to itself as Wybrzeże Gdańsk.

The 1960s remained a positive era for the club and they won the bronze medal in 1965 and the silver medal in 1967 headed by riders such as Kaiser, Zbigniew Podlecki and Henryk Żyto.

The 1970s saw little team success but Zenon Plech was the Golden Helmet winner in 1978 and Polish champion in 1979.

The 1980s proved to be another quiet period, with the only significant honours being a team silver medal in 1985 and the Polish Pairs Speedway Championship (Zenon Plech and Grzegorz Dzikowski) in the same season. However, Zenon Plech won two more Polish titles in 1984 and 1985. The 1990s continued in the same manner with little success except winning the second division in 1993 and winning a bronze medal in 1999 after signing Tony Rickardsson and Sebastian Ułamek.

=== 2000 to 2005 ===
Gdansk were inaugural members of the Ekstraliga in 2000, but they suffered relegation to the 1. Liga that season, this was despite a bronze medal win the previous season. They bounced back by winning 1.Liga in 2001. In 2005 club has closed.

=== 2006 to present ===
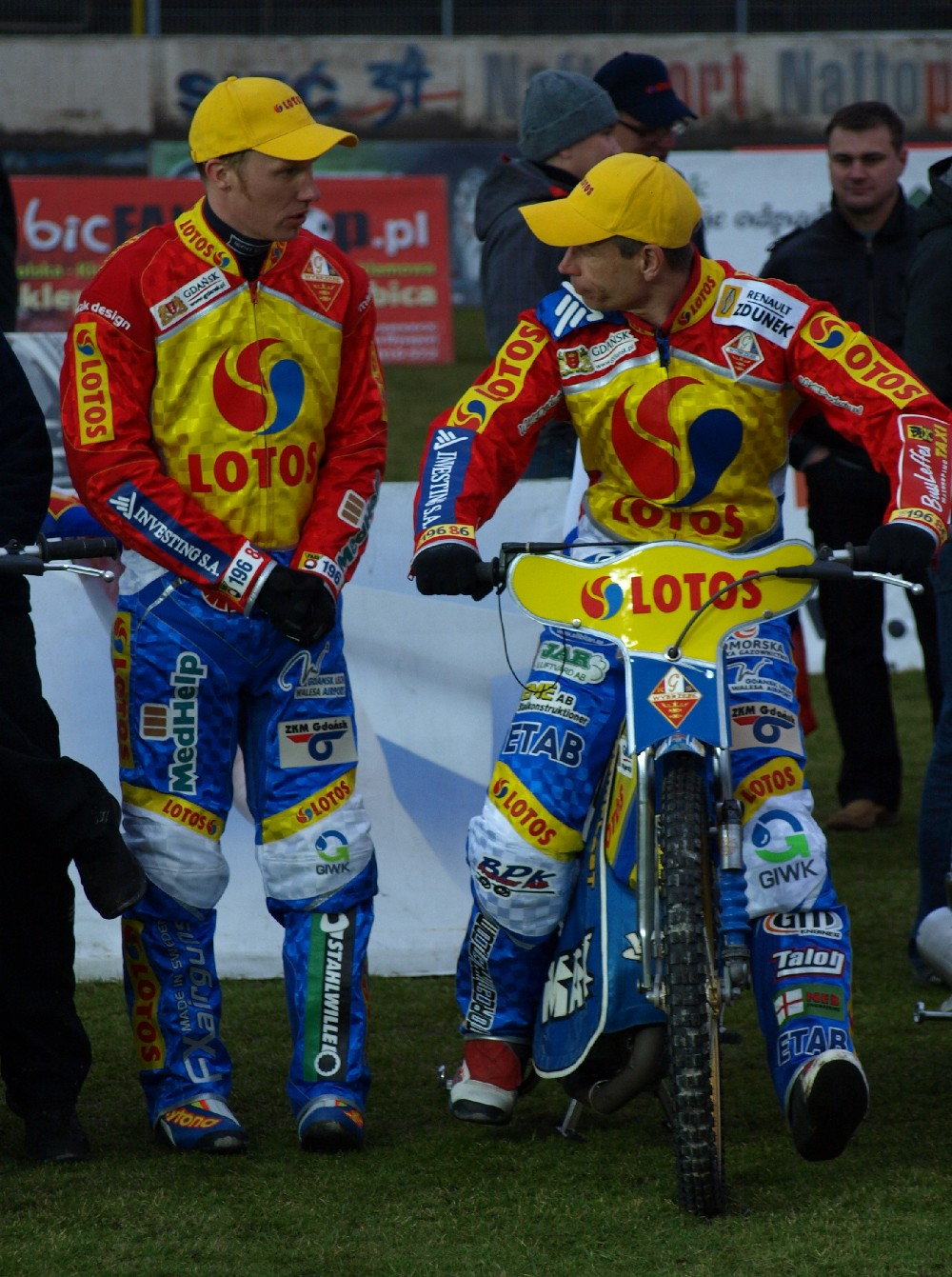
Wybrzeże Gdańsk riders before a match in 2011

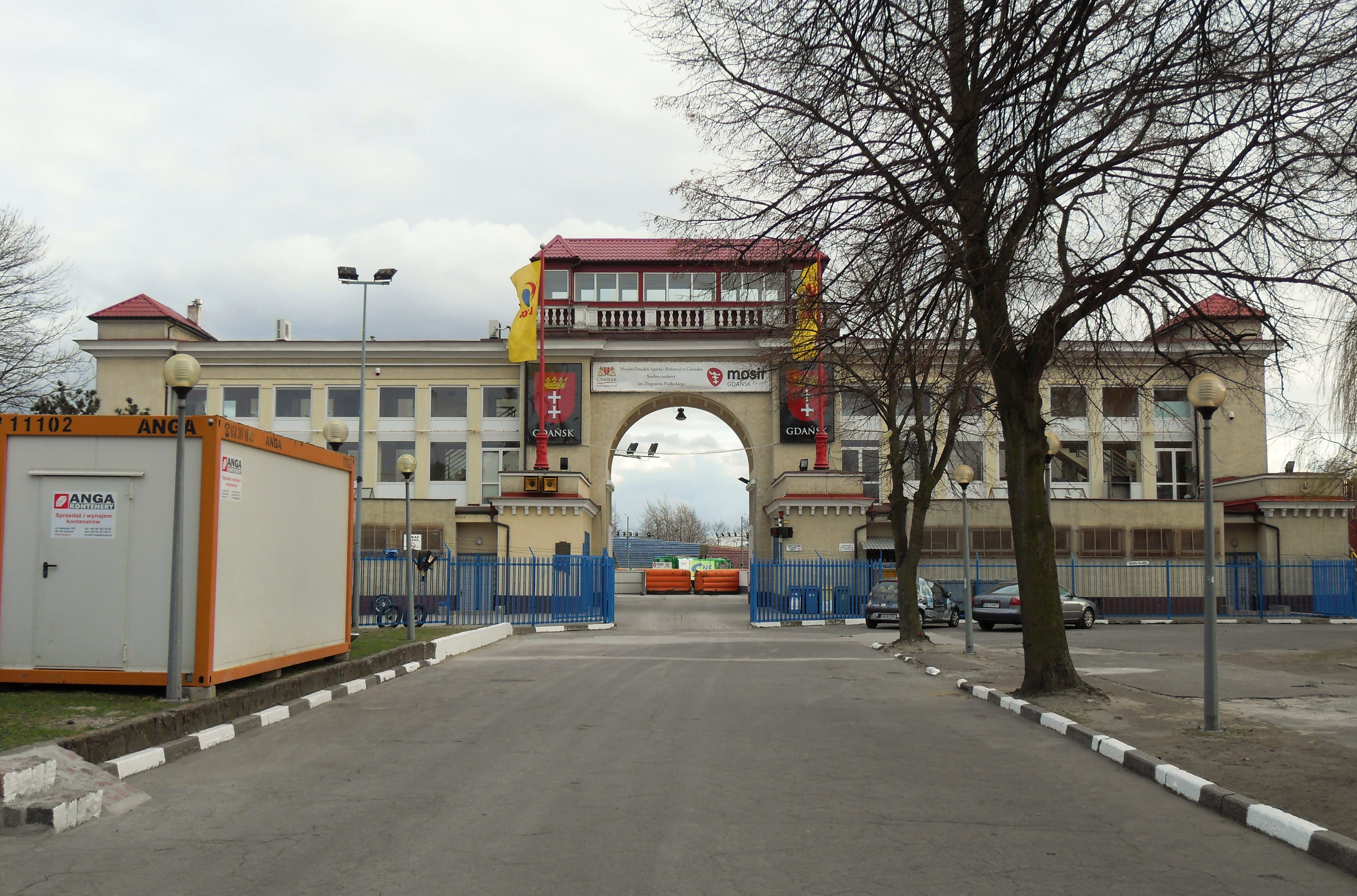
Marathon Gate, part of the stadium

However the following season a new club was established, which excluded the activity of the GKS. GKŻ Wybrzeże Gdańsk raced until 2008 and from the 2009 season, with promotion to Ekstraliga the club Wybrzeże Gdańsk Inc was established on 3 November 2008.

In recent years their success has been restricted to the 1. Liga title in 2013 and the 2. Liga title in 2015. Additionally, various licence changes have taken place and after the 2024 season, the team finished last in the 1st league and were relegated to the National League.

In 2025, the club won the third tier National League.

== Riders ==
=== Current teams ===
Status at 24th of November 2024

Cat.	Player	DMP (KLŻ)	DMPJ	Comments
S	(Denmark) Tim Sørensen	✓		
S	(Denmark) Niels-Kristian Iversen	✓		
S	(Poland) Daniel Kaczmarek	✓		
U24	(Denmark) Benjamin Basso	✓		
U23	(Denmark) Marcus Birkemose	✓		Hire from Stal Gorzów
U23	(Poland) Kacper Grzelak	✓		Hire from KS Toruń
U21	(Poland) Miłosz Wysocki	✓	✓	
U21	(Poland) Bartosz Tyburski	✓	✓	
U21	(Poland) Jędrzej Chmura	✓	✓	
U19	(Poland) Eryk Kamiński	✓	✓	

=== Notable riders ===
- (Poland) Grzegorz Dzikowski
- (Poland) Marian Kaiser
- (Poland) Zenon Plech
- (Poland) Zbigniew Podlecki
- (Sweden) Tony Rickardsson
- (Poland) Sebastian Ułamek
- (Poland) Paweł Waloszek
- (Poland) Henryk Żyto

== Honours ==
=== To 2005 ===
Competitions	Total	Golden medals		Silver medals		Bronze medals
Competitions	Total	Total	Years	Total	Years	Total	Years
Team (DMP) (since 1948)	6			4	1960, 1967, 1978, 1985	2	1965, 1997
Team U-21 (MDMP) (since 1978)	5	1	1983	2	1978, 1980, 2010, 2012	2	1984, 2015
Pairs (MPPK) (since 1974)	6	1	1985	2	1986, 2000	3	1984, 1987, 2004
Pairs U-21 (MMPPK) (1980 U-23; since 1983)	4	1	1989	2	1983, 2000	1	2013
Individual (IMP) (since 1948)	10	3	1979, 1984, 1985	4	1960, 1961, 1981, 1983	3	1963, 1989, 1994
Individual U-21 (MIMP) (since 1967)	9	1	1980			8	1970, 1972, 1982, 1983, 1987, 1989, 1998, 2012
Total Polish Championship medals: 40		Gold: 7		Silver: 14		Bronze: 19
Competitions	Total	I place		II place		III place
Competitions	Total	Total	Years	Total	Years	Total	Years
European Club (KPE) (since 1998)	0
Team Cup (DPP) (?)	2	1	1999	1	1978
Golden Helmet (ZK) (since 1961)	9	2	1962, 1978	5	1983, 1984, 1985, 1995, 2000	2	1961, 1982
Silver Helmet U-21 (SK) (since 1966)	7	2	1981, 1988	2	1989, 2014	3	1970, 1978, 1990
Bronze Helmet U-19 (BK) (1976-81; since 1983)	9	4	1981, 1988, 2012, 2013	2	1987, 2014	3	1980, 1989, 2019

=== From 2006 ===
Team Speedway Junior Polish Championship

- 2nd place (2): 2010, 2012
- 3rd place (1): 2015

Polish Pairs Speedway Junior Championship

- 3rd place (1): 2013

== Historical team names ==
Nr.	Validity period	Name
1.	2006	GKŻ Lotos Gdańsk
2.	2007-2008	Lotos Gdańsk
3.	2009-2012	Lotos Wybrzeże Gdańsk
4.	2013-2014	Renault Zdunek Wybrzeże Gdańsk
5.	2015	Wybrzeże Gdańsk
6.	2016	Renault Zdunek Wybrzeże Gdańsk
7.	2017-2023	Zdunek Wybrzeże Gdańsk
8.	2024	Energa Wybrzeże Gdańsk

Season	Sport's League			Comment
Season	League		Place	Comment
2006	III	II league	▲1/9	
2007	II	I league	3/8	
2008	II	I league	2/8	▲ Won play-offs
2009	I	Ekstraliga	▼8/8	
2010	II	I league	2/8	Lost play-offs
2011	II	I league	2/8	▲ Won play-offs
2012	I	Ekstraliga	▼10/10	
2013	II	I league	1/7	
2014	I	Ekstraliga	▼8/8	▼ Club lost license after season and start from 2nd league
2015	III	II league	1/5	
2016	II	I league	6/11	
2017	II	I league	2/8	Lost play-offs
2018	II	I league	6/8	
2019	II	I league	5/7	
2020	II	I league	4/8	
2021	II	I league	4/8	
2022	II	I league	6/8	
2023	II	I league	6/8	
2024	II	2. Ekstraliga	▼8/8	

== Former sports sections ==
The club had many sections over the years, out of which only the speedway and handball sections exist to this day as separately run entities.

Athletics The athletics team competed between 1945-1971. The club's achievements were:

- 22 Senior Polish Championship Titles
- European Championships Vice-Champion: Władysław Nikiciuk - javelin, 1966 European Athletics Championships
- European Championships Bronze Medal: Władysław Komar - shot put, 1966 European Athletics Championships

Basketball There was a men's section which existed between 1949-1995. The club made a brief re-appearance 2007-2009 before it folded once more. The club's honours include:

- 4x Polish Champions: 1971, 1972, 1973, 1978
- 3x Polish Cup Winners: 1976, 1978, 1979
- 3 Individual European Championship medals
  - Zbigniew Dregier
    - Silver: Wrocław 1963
    - Bronze: Moscow 1965, Helsinki 1967

Boxing The section existed between 1945-1990. Their honours included:

- 21 Individual Polish Senior Championship titles
- 3 Olympic Medals
  - Silver: Aleksy Antkiewicz, Helsinki 1952
  - Bronze: Aleksy Antkiewicz, London 1948
  - Bronze: Hubert Skrzypczak, Mexico City 1968
- European Championships
  - 3 titles (Gold Medals)
    - Zenon Stefaniuk, 1953 & 1955
    - Hubert Skrzypczak, 1968
  - 3 Runners-up titles (Silver Medals)
    - Bogdan Węgrzyniak, 1953
    - Henryk Dampc, 1959
    - Hubert Skrzypczak, 1965
  - 1 Bronze Medal
    - Aleksy Antkiewicz (1953)

Gymnastics The section only existed for 4 years between 1952-1956. Lidia Szczerbińska won a bronze medal at the 1956 Summer Olympics in Melbourne whilst representing the club.

Handball

Judo The section existed in 1958–2002, and as a separate entity since 2004. Club honours of the section are:

- 45 Individual Polish Championship Titles
- 11 Team Polish Championship titles
- 2 Olympic Medals
  - Silver: Janusz Pawłowski, Seoul 1988
  - Bronze: Janusz Pawłowski, Moscow 1980
- 4 World Judo Championship Bronze Medals
  - Antoni Reiter: 1973
  - Janusz Pawłowski: 1979, 1983, 1987
- 10 European Championship Medals
  - 1 Gold Medal
    - Antoni Reiter: 1975
  - 1 Silver Medal
    - Antoni Reiter: 1974
  - 8 Bronze Medals
    - Antoni Reiter: 1976
    - Jan Okrój: 1963
    - Kazimierz Jaremczak: 1965
    - Czesław Kur: 1968, 1969
    - Janusz Pawłowski: 1982, 1983, 1986

Other sections There were five other sections of the club, but they were short-lived and without any major sporting success.

- Football (1945–1961, 2015–2020)
- Volleyball (1945–1969)
- Cycling (1945–1955)
- Motorcycle club (1948–1955)
- Wrestling (1951–1955)
