= Unia Tarnów (motorcycle speedway) =

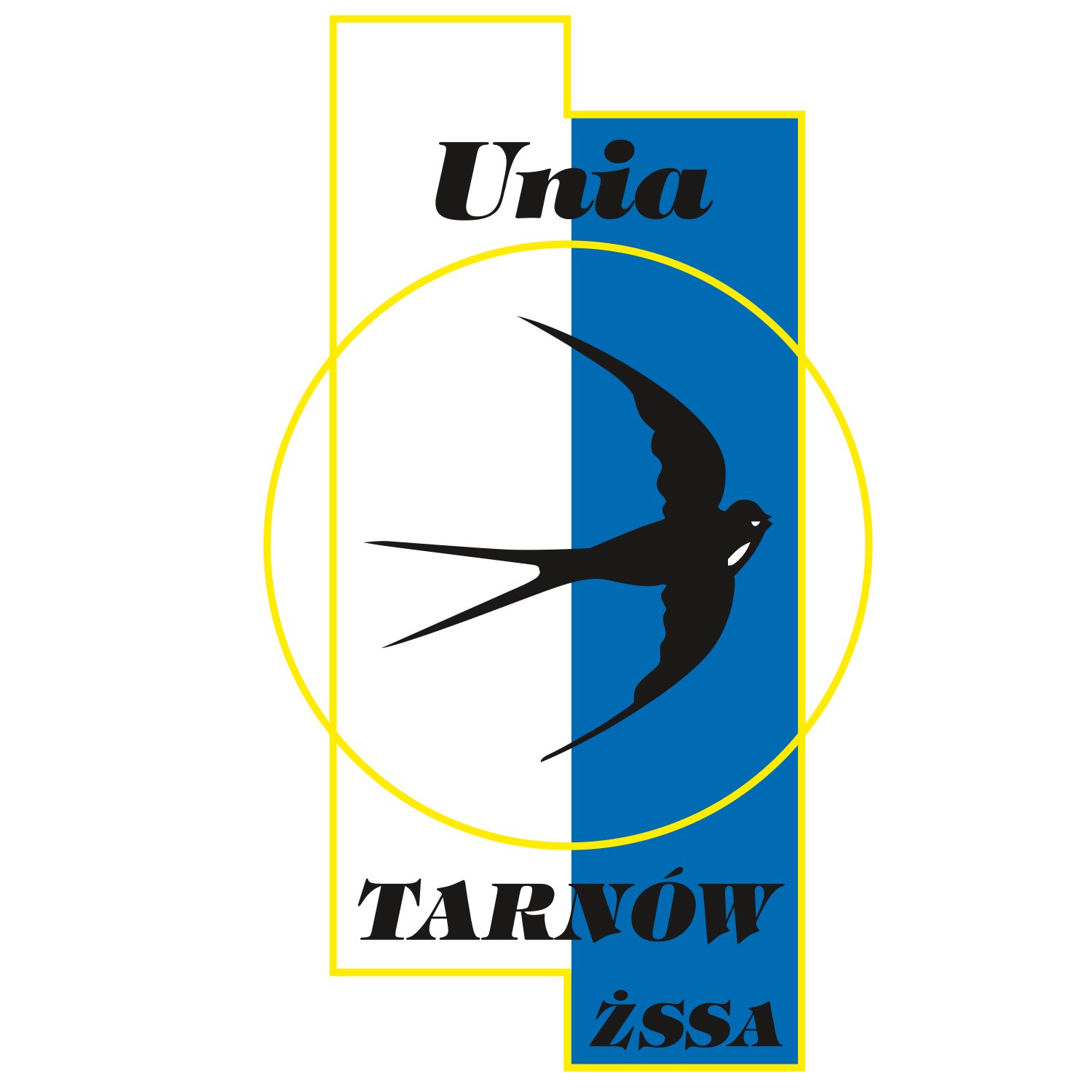

Club information
- Track address: Stadion Miejski w Tarnowie; Tarnów, Poland
- Country: Poland
- Founded: 1957
- Team manager: Tomasz Proszowski
- League: 2. Liga
- Website: Official Website

Club facts
- Colours: White and Blue
- Nickname: Swallows
- Track record time: 67.49 seconds
- Track record date: 8 June 2014
- Track record holder: Greg Hancock

Major team honours
Team Polish Champions	2004, 2005, 2012
Pairs Polish Champion	2007, 2013
Individual Polish Champion	1967, 2005, 2006, 2007, 2013
silver medal	1994
bronze medal	2013, 2014, 2015

Unia Tarnów is a Polish motorcycle speedway club from Tarnów in Poland. The team compete in the Polish Speedway Second League (2. Liga). and have won the Team Speedway Polish Championship three times.

== History ==
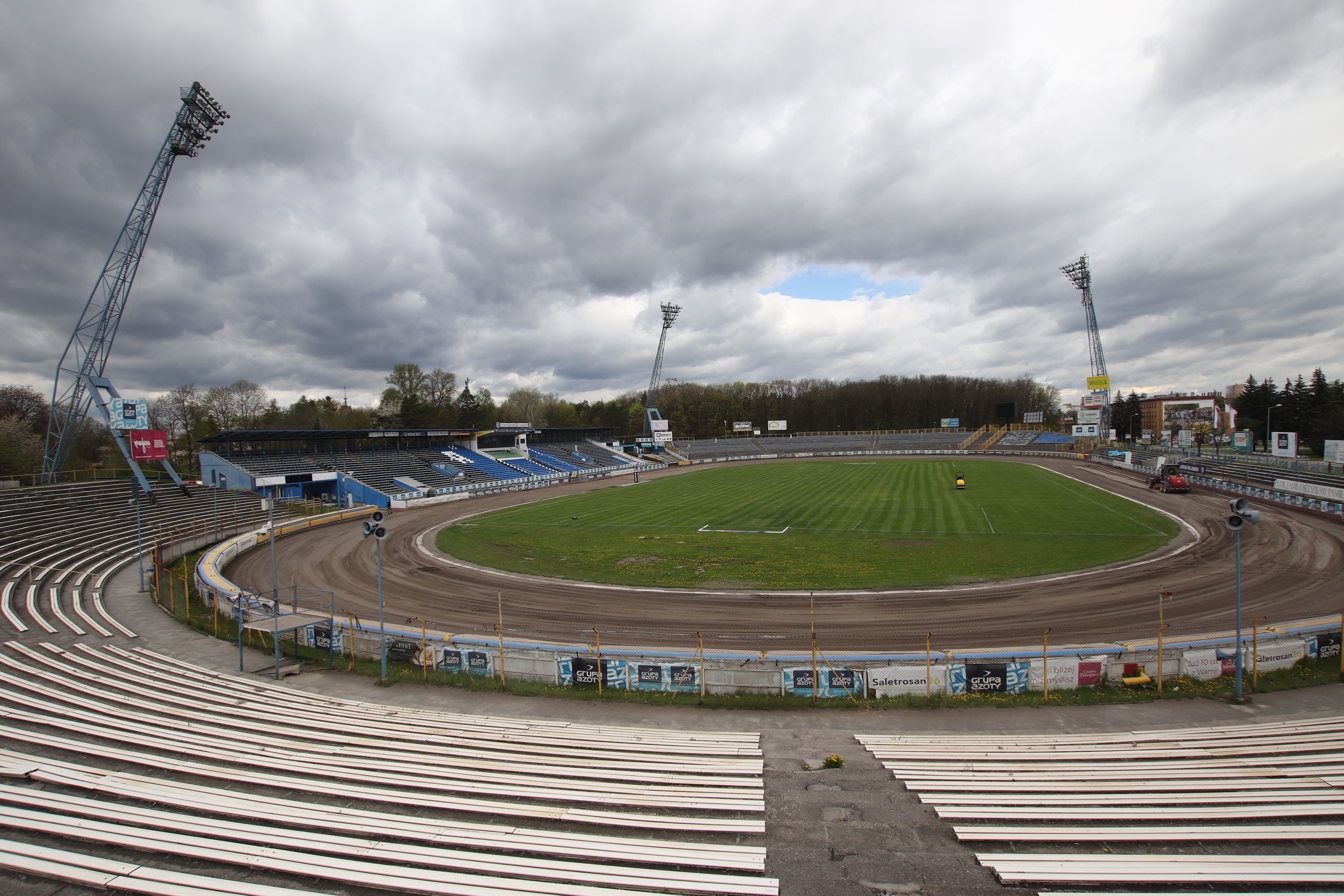
Tarnów Municipal Stadium

=== 1957 to 1989 ===
The club was founded 1957 as a section of a multi-sports club of the same name, which was founded in 1928. It would not be until 2001 that the club became a separate entity but retained the same historic name.

The first honour was winning the second division in 1963. Zygmunt Pytko later became the Polish champion in 1967.

The team spent most of the 1970s and 1980s either battling relegation in the first division or challenging promotion in the second division but in general there was little in the way of success.

=== 1990 to 1999 ===
The club gained promotion in 1990 and made a statement of intent in 1994 by signing one of the world's leading riders Tony Rickardsson. The impact was instant and they won a silver medal in the Polish Championship. However, not even Rickardsson could save them from relegation in 1996.

=== 2000 to 2015 ===
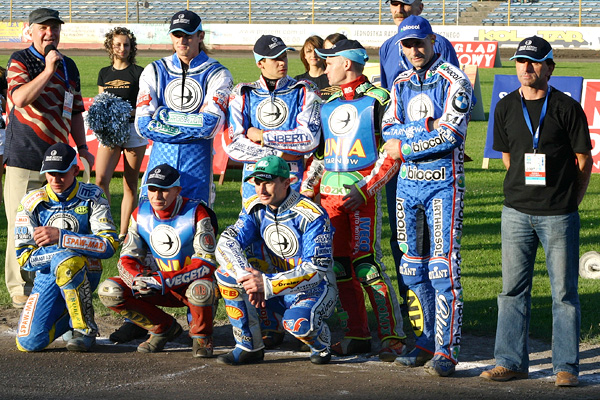
the team in 2007

When the Ekstraliga was introduced in 2000, the team were competing in the 2. Liga but in 2001 the sealed promotion and began to build in form.

Janusz Kołodziej and Tomasz Gollob were signed and Rickardsson returned for the 2004 Polish speedway season. The team won the gold medal for the first time in their history and then successfully defended their title in 2005. Three Unia riders became consecutive Polish champions, Kołodziej was champion in 2005, Gollob in 2006 and Rune Holta in 2007. Gollob and Holta also won the 2007 pairs championship.

Further success came from 2012 to 2016 as the club won the gold medal in 2012, the pairs in 2013 and three consecutive bronze medals in 2013, 2014 and 2015. Maciej Janowski also won the 2013 Golden Helmet.

=== 2016 to present ===
Since 2015, the team have experienced mediocrity with just one 1.Liga title success in 2017.

== Teams ==
=== 2023 team ===
- (Finland) Tero Aarnio
- (Denmark) René Bach
- (Poland) Oskar Bober
- (Denmark) William Drejer
- (Poland) Mateusz Gzyl
- (Denmark) Kenneth Hansen
- (Poland) Jan Heleniak
- (Slovenia) Matic Ivačič
- (Czech Republic) Daniel Klima
- (Poland) Ernest Koza
- (United Kingdom) Richard Lawson
- (Poland) Patryk Rolnicki
- (Poland) Piotr Pioro
- (Poland) Pawel Pikul
- (Poland) Piotr Swiercz

=== Previous teams ===
Extended content

2022 team

- (Denmark) Kenneth Hansen
- (Sweden) Peter Ljung
- (Poland) William Drejer
- (Poland) Oskar Bober
- (Poland) Patryk Rolnicki
- (Finland) Tero Aarnio
- (Poland) Piotr Swiercz

== Notable riders ==
- (Poland) Tomasz Gollob
- (United States) Greg Hancock
- (Poland) Rune Holta
- (Poland) Maciej Janowski
- (Poland) Janusz Kołodziej
- (Russia) Artem Laguta
- (Poland) Zygmunt Pytko
- (Sweden) Tony Rickardsson
- (Slovakia) Martin Vaculik

== Honours ==
Team Polish Champions

- Gold: 3 (2004, 2005, 2012)
- Silver: 1 (1994)
- Bronze: 2 (2013, 2014)

Pair Polish Champion

- Gold: 2 (2007, 2013)
- Silver: 2 (2004, 2009)

Individual Polish Champion

- Gold: 5 (1967, 2005, 2006, 2007, 2013)
- Silver: 3 (2005, 2007, 2010)
- Bronze: 3 (2005, 2009, 2013)
