= Polonia Piła =

Motorcycle speedway club

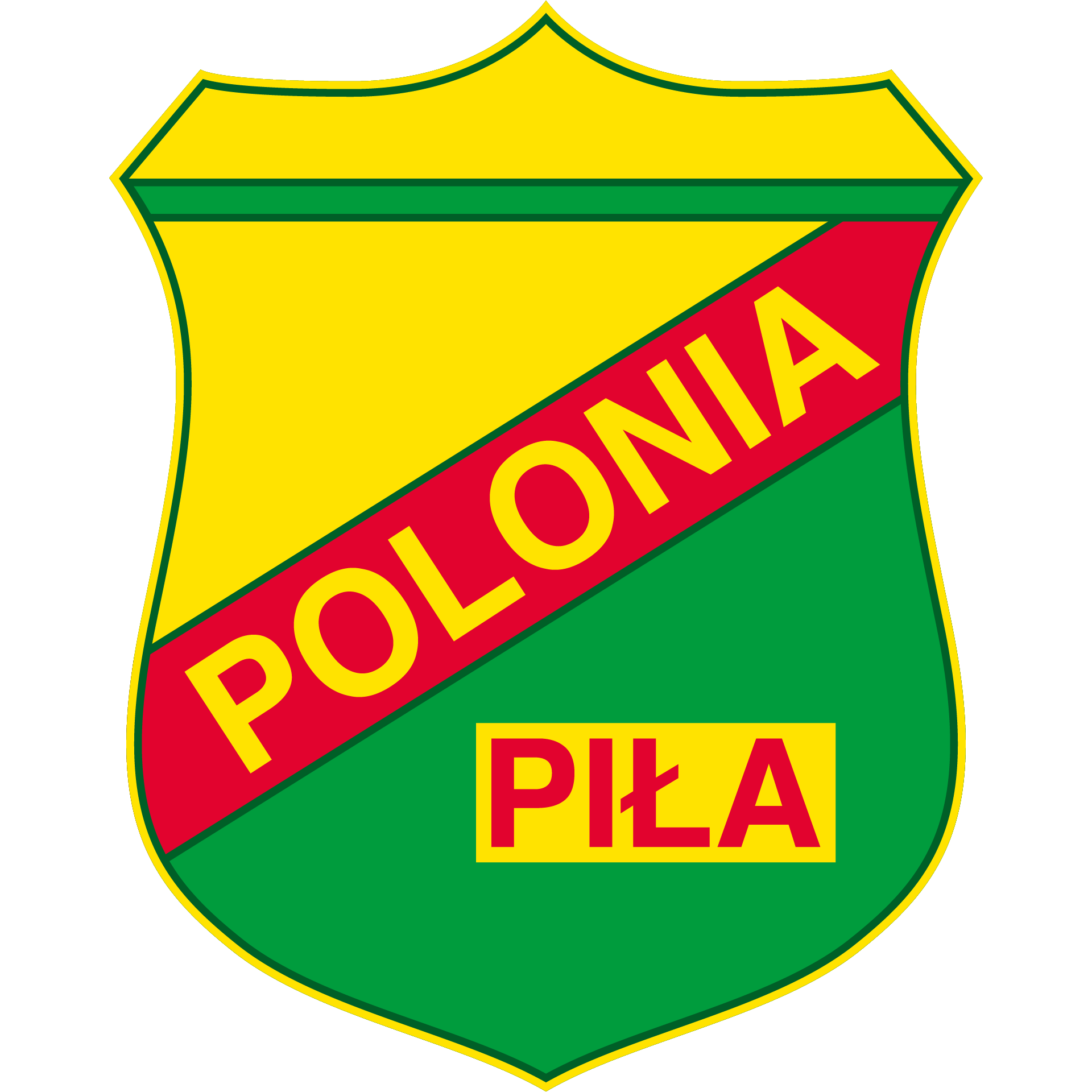

Club information
- Track address: Stadion Polonii Piła ul. Bydgoska 1, 64-920 Piła
- Country: Poland
- Founded: 1945; 1950 (speedway section)
- Team manager: Ryszard Dolomisiewicz
- League: 2. Liga

Club facts
- Colours: Yellow, red and green

Major team honours
Polish champions	1999
Polish league silver medal	1998, 2000
Polish league bronze medal	1996, 1997
Second tier champions	1994
Third tier champions	2011

Polonia Piła is a Polish motorcycle speedway team based in Piła who currently race in the Polish Speedway Second League (2. Liga). They have won the Team Speedway Polish Championship once in 1999.

== History ==
=== 1957 to 1968 ===
Polonia Piła was founded in 1945 as a multi-sports club. The speedway section was founded in 1950. It started competing in the Team Speedway Polish Championship as Polonia Piła in 1957. They struggled in the lowest division until 1968, when they disbanded.

=== 1992 to 1999 ===
In 1992 the team returned to action competing in the second division. In 1994, they signed former world champion Hans Nielsen and won the second league and gained promotion to the highest division (the first league at the time). After their promotion the team experienced their best spell in their history.

Hans Nielsen topped the Polish averages with 2.772 in 1995 and then they won the bronze medal in the 1996 and 1997 Polish Championships followed by a silver medal in 1998. In 1999, the team finished second in the regular season table and then won the play offs to become champions of Poland for the first time. The riders that brought success to the club (in addition to Nielsen) included Rafał Dobrucki, Jacek Gollob and Jarosław Hampel.

=== 2000 to 2021 ===
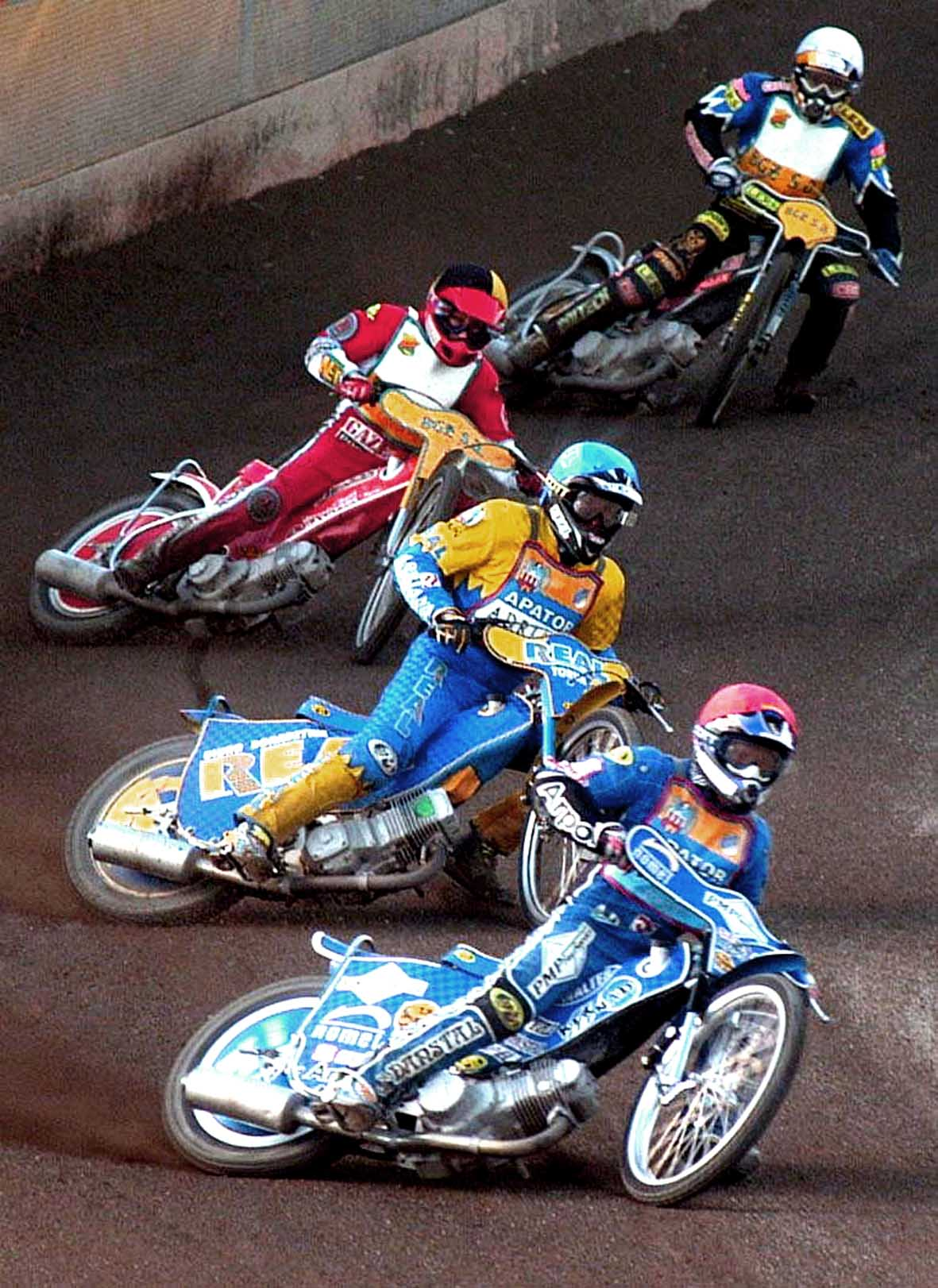
Toruń versus Piła in 2007

Pila were inaugural members of the Ekstraliga in 2000 and won the silver medal. Jacek Gollob won the Polish Individual Speedway Championship in 2000.

From 2003, the club experienced significant problems on and off the track. Financial issues, team promotion and management changes and quickfire relegations in 2003 and 2005 resulted in the team finding themselves in the 2. Liga (the third tier). The problems continued with the team changing their name on more than one occasion. A better season in 2011, when they won the Second League was ruined by liquidation in 2012. However, yet another new name Victoria Piła was used for the 2013 to 2015 seasons before reverting back to Polonia for the 2016 season.

=== 2022 to present ===
During the 2022 Polish Speedway season Polonia returned the 2. Liga but finished last. In 2023, a new management team took over the club and they would be known as KS Polonia.

== Teams ==
=== 2023 team ===
- (Denmark) Michael Palm Toft
- (Poland) Artur Mroczka
- (England) Dan Gilkes
- (Sweden) Daniel Henderson
- (Poland) Marcin Jędrzejewski
- (Denmark) Jonas Knudsen
- (Poland) Piotr Gryszpinski

=== Previous teams ===
Extended content

2022 team

- (Slovenia) Matic Ivačič
- (Poland) Artur Mroczka
- (Poland) Marcin Jedrzejjewski
- (Poland) Tomasz Orwat
- (Poland) Kacper Makowski
- (Poland) Marcin Ogrodnik
- (Poland) Lars Skupien
- (Germany) Lukas Fienhage

== Notable riders ==
- (Poland) Rafał Dobrucki
- (Poland) Jacek Gollob
- (Poland) Jarosław Hampel
- (Denmark) Hans Nielsen
- (Poland) Przemysław Pawlicki
