= 2012 Speedway Grand Prix Qualification =

Motorcycle speedway event

Seasons
- ← 2011 2013 →

The 2012 Individual Speedway World Championship Grand Prix Qualification were a series of motorcycle speedway meetings used to determine the three riders who qualified for the 2012 Speedway Grand Prix. The top eight riders finishing the 2011 Grand Prix series automatically qualified for 2012. The final round of qualification – the Grand Prix Challenge – took place on 20 August 2011, in Vetlanda, Sweden.

== Qualifying rounds ==
=== Round One ===
- 7 May 2011
- (Slovenia) Matija Gubec Stadium, Krško
- Referee: Pavel Vana / Jury President: Jørgen L. Jensen
- Change:

Draw 15. (Netherlands) → (Sweden)
Draw 3. (Hungary) József Tabaka → Norbert Magosi

Pos.	Rider	Points	Details
1	(Poland) (13) Adrian Miedziński	13+3	(3,3,2,3,2)
2	(Slovenia) (11) Matej Žagar	13+2	(3,3,3,1,3)
3	(Czech Republic) (14) Lukáš Dryml	11+3	(1,3,2,3,2)
4	(Poland) (8) Piotr Protasiewicz	11+2	(2,3,3,0,3)
5	(Czech Republic) (4) Matěj Kůs	10	(2,2,3,3,R)
6	(Sweden) (1) Simon Gustafsson	9	(3,2,2,1,1)
7	(Sweden) (15) David Ruud	9	(2,2,1,2,2)
8	(Russia) (5) Denis Gizatullin	9	(3,1,3,1,1)
9	(Hungary) (3) Norbert Magosi	8	(0,1,1,3,3)
10	(Slovenia) (2) Aleksander Čonda	7+3	(1,1,F,2,3)
11	(France) (10) Mathieu Tresarrieu	7+2	(2,2,1,2,0)
12	(Sweden) (12) Daniel Nermark	7+R	(1,1,2,2,1)
13	(Slovenia) (16) Matija Duh	3	(R,0,1,0,2)
14	(Russia) (9) Alexey Kharchenko	3	(0,0,1,1,1)
15	(Netherlands) (6) Henry Van Der Steen	1	(1,0,0,0,0)
16	(Austria) (7) Lukas Simon	0	(X,0,0,0,0)
—	(Slovenia) (17) Samo Kukovica	—	—
—	(Slovenia) (18) Denis Štojs	—	—

=== Round Two ===
- 13 June 2011
- (Germany) Motorstadion Abensberg, Abensberg
- Referee: Pavel Vana / Jury President: Jørgen L. Jensen
- Change:

Draw 2. (Poland) Damian Baliński → Jędrzejak

Pos.	Rider	Points	Details
1	(Finland) (9) Joonas Kylmäkorpi	14	(2,3,3,3,3)
2	(Germany) (16) Martin Smolinski	13	(2,3,3,3,2)
3	(Australia) (7) Davey Watt	12+3	(2,3,3,3,1)
4	(Australia) (12) Darcy Ward	12+2	(3,2,3,2,2)
5	(Denmark) (3) Peter Kildemand	10	(2,2,2,1,3)
6	(Germany) (18) Max Dilger	9	(3,1,0,2,3)
7	(Russia) (8) Victor Golubovsky	8	(3,1,F,2,2)
8	(Denmark) (14) Kenneth Hansen	7+3	(1,2,1,1,2)
9	(Germany) (4) Tobias Kroner	7+2	(1,0,1,2,3)
10	(Argentina) (15) Lisandro R. Husman	7+1	(3,1,1,1,1)
11	(Slovenia) (11) Matic Voldrih	6	(1,0,2,3,0)
12	(Ukraine) (13) Kilril Tsukanov	5	(0,2,2,1,1)
13	(Italy) (5) Cristian Carrica	4	(1,0,2,0,1)
14	(Poland) (2) Tomasz Jędrzejak	3	(T/-,3,X,0,N)
15	(Germany) (17) Richard Speiser	1	(0,1,-,-,-)
16	(Ukraine) (6) Oleksandr Borodai	0	(0,F,0,0,0)
17	(Argentina) (10) Julio Romano	0	(F,X,F,T/-,M)
—	(Germany) (1) Christian Hefenbrock	—	—

Hefenbrock (#1) replaced by #17
Reserve #18 rode in heats: 1 (#2), 9 (#17), 13 (#17), 15 (#10), 17 (#17)

=== Round Three ===
- 17 June 2011
- (Denmark) Korskro Motor Center, Esbjerg
- Referee: J. Lawrence / Jury President: M. Spinka
- Change:

Draw 3. (United States) Ryan Fisher → Marcin Sekulla
Draw 10. (Canada) Kyle Legault → Fisher
Draw 14. (United States) Ricky Wells → Ulrich Ostergaard (Reserve 17)

Pos.	Rider	Points	Details
1	(Sweden) (13) Jonas Davidsson	13	(3,3,2,3,2)
2	(Denmark) (16) Bjarne Pedersen	12+3	(2,3,1,3,3)
3	(United Kingdom) (12) Edward Kennett	12+2	(3,1,3,2,3)
4	(Poland) (4) Krzysztof Buczkowski	11	(3,2,3,0,3)
5	(Denmark) (1) Leon Madsen	11	(2,1,2,3,3)
6	(United Kingdom) (6) Daniel King	10	(1,3,3,3,0)
7	(Russia) (5) Renat Gafurov	9	(2,2,1,2,2)
8	(Australia) (15) Rory Schlein	8	(1,2,2,1,2)
9	(Poland) (11) Grzegorz Walasek	7	(2,3,0,1,1)
10	(Denmark) (8) Nicolai Klindt	6+3	(3,0,2,0,1)
11	(Germany) (3) Marcin Sekulla	6+2	(1,1,3,0,1)
12	(Sweden) (9) Thomas H. Jonasson	5	(1,X,0,2,2)
13	(United States) (10) Ryan Fisher	4	(0,2,1,1,0)
14	(Latvia) (2) Jevgēņijs Karavackis	3	(0,0,0,2,1)
15	(Denmark) (14) Ulrich Ostergaard	3	(0,1,1,1,0)
16	(Norway) (7) Rune Sola	0	(0,0,0,0,0)
—	(Denmark) (17) Kenni Arendt Larsen	—	—
—	(Denmark) (18) Michael Jepsen Jensen	—	—

=== Round Four ===
- 18 June 2011
- (Czech Republic) Areál Ploché dráhy Divišov, Divisov
- Referee: Jesper Steentoft / Jury President: Andrzej Grodzki
- Change:

Draw 6. (Norway) → (Australia)
Draw 18. (Czech Republic) Tomáš Suchánek → Martin Gavenda

Pos.	Rider	Points	Details
1	(Slovakia) (8) Martin Vaculík	13	(3,2,3,2,3)
2	(Poland) (13) Maciej Janowski	12	(2,3,3,3,1)
3	(Sweden) (12) Magnus Zetterström	11	(3,3,3,2,-)
4	(Denmark) (11) Niels Kristian Iversen	10	(2,3,2,1,2)
5	(Poland) (9) Przemysław Pawlicki	9	(1,1,1,3,3)
6	(Latvia) (10) Kjasts Puodžuks	9	(0,3,2,2,2)
7	(Germany) (7) Kevin Wölbert	9	(2,1,1,3,2)
8	(Ukraine) (14) Aleksandr Loktaev	9	(1,2,2,1,3)
9	(Australia) (6) Cameron Woodward	8	(0,0,3,2,3)
10	(Ukraine) (1) Andriy Karpov	7	(3,2,1,X,1)
11	(Czech Republic) (15) Martin Málek	6	(3,2,1,F,R)
12	(United Kingdom) (3) Simon Stead	5	(2,0,0,1,2)
13	(Russia) (16) Andrey Kudryashov	4	(0,R,0,3,1)
14	(Czech Republic) (5) Hynek Stichauer	4	(1,R,2,R,1)
15	(Czech Republic) (17) Zdeněk Simota	3	(1,1,0,1,0)
16	(Czech Republic) (18) Martin Gavenda	1	(0,1,0,0,0)
—	(Czech Republic) (2) Aleš Dryml, Jr.	—	—
—	(Russia) (4) Artem Laguta	—	—

Laguta (#4) replaced by #17
Dryml (#2) replaced by #18

=== Round Five ===
- 18 June 2011
- (Italy) Pista Olimpia Terenzano, Terenzano
- Referee: Susanne Huttinger / Jury President: Ilkka Teromaa
- Change:

Draw 7. (Croatia) → (Czech Republic)

Pos.	Rider	Points	Details
1	(Denmark) (16) Jesper B. Monberg	14	
2	(Poland) (11) Krzysztof Kasprzak	13	
3	(Poland) (9) Sebastian Ułamek	12+3	
4	(Sweden) (6) Peter Ljung	12+F	
5	(Sweden) (1) Antonio Lindbäck	22	
6	(United Kingdom) (2) Ben Barker	9	
7	(United Kingdom) (15) James Wright	9	
8	(Czech Republic) (7) Tomáš Suchánek	8	
9	(Denmark) (3) Hans N. Andersen	7	
10	(Slovenia) (10) Ales Kraljic	6	
11	(Finland) (14) Tero Aarnio	4	
12	(Germany) (4) Frank Facher	4	
13	(Hungary) (8) József Tabaka	4	
14	(Italy) (12) Guglielmo Franchetti	3	
15	(Italy) (5) Mattia Carpanese	2	
16	(Czech Republic) (13) Filip Šitera	2	
—	(Italy) (17) Alessandro Novello	—	—
—	(Italy) (18) Dario Del Torre	—	—

== Race-offs ==
=== Race-off One ===
- 2 July 2011
- (Latvia) Stadium Lokomotīve, Daugavpils
- Referee: Christian Froschauer / Jury President: Ilkka Teromaa

Pos.	Rider	Points	Details
1	(Sweden) (5) Peter Ljung	13	(3,2,3,3,2)
2	(Poland) (16) Krzysztof Buczkowski	11	(1,2,3,2,3)
3	(Poland) (7) Krzysztof Kasprzak	10+3	(1,2,2,3,2)
4	(Sweden) (14) Simon Gustafsson	10+2	(3,3,0,1,3)
5	(Russia) (4) Victor Golubovski	10+1	(1,3,3,3,0)
6	(Denmark) (15) Hans N. Andersen	10+0	(2,3,1,2,2)
7	(Denmark) (9) Kenneth Hansen	9	(3,1,3,1,1)
8	(Poland) (3) Adrian Miedziński	7	(0,1,2,1,3)
9	(Germany) (12) Martin Smolinski	7	(0,1,2,2,2)
10	(Czech Republic) (1) Matěj Kůs	6	(3,0,0,0,3)
11	(Russia) (2) Renat Gafurov	6	(2,1,0,3,0)
12	(Ukraine) (8) Aleksandr Loktaev	6	(2,0,1,2,1)
13	(Latvia) (13) Andzejs Lebedevs	4	(0,3,1,0,0)
14	(Latvia) (10) Kjasts Puodžuks	4	(2,2,0,0,0)
15	(Australia) (11) Rory Schlein	4	(1,0,1,1,1)
16	(United Kingdom) (6) Edward Kennett	3	(0,0,2,R,1)
—	(Ukraine) (17) Andrij Karpov	—	—
—	(Denmark) (18) Nicolai Klindt	—	—

=== Race-off Three ===
- 2 July 2011
- (Croatia) Goričan
- Referee: Mick Bates / Jury President: Milan Spinka

Pos.	Rider	Points	Details
1	(Sweden) (9) Antonio Lindbäck	14	(3,3,2,3,3)
2	(Slovenia) (4) Matej Žagar	11+3+3	(2,1,3,2,3)
3	(Poland) (16) Sebastian Ułamek	11+2+2+2	(3,2,2,2,2)
4	(Denmark) (12) Leon Madsen	11+3+1	(1,3,3,3,1)
5	(Slovakia) (3) Martin Vaculík	11+1+3+0	(3,3,0,3,2)
6	(Australia) (6) Davey Watt	11+2+1	(3,2,3,X,3)
7	(Sweden) (8) Jonas Davidsson	9	(2,0,3,1,3)
8	(Australia) (15) Darcy Ward	8	(2,2,1,1,2)
9	(Denmark) (14) Niels Kristian Iversen	7	(1,3,1,2,0)
10	(Poland) (2) Maciej Janowski	7	(0,1,2,3,1)
11	(Germany) (10) Max Dilger	6	(2,0,2,1,1)
12	(United Kingdom) (11) Ben Barker	5	(0,1,1,2,1)
13	(United Kingdom) (5) James Wright	3	(1,0,0,0,2)
14	(Croatia) (13) Dino Kovacic	2	(0,2,0,0,0)
15	(Slovenia) (17) Aleksander Čonda	2	(0,0,1,1,0)
16	(Russia) (1) Denis Gizatullin	2	(1,1,0,0,0)
—	(Slovenia) (18) Ales Kraljic	—	—
—	(Czech Republic) (7) Lukáš Dryml	—	—

Dryml (#7) replaced by #17

Mini-tournament for 2nd to 6th placed:

1. Semi-Final 1: Zagar, Watt, Vaculik
2. Semi-Final 2: Madsen, Ułamek
3. Run-off: Vaculik, Ułamek, Watt
4. Final: Zagar, Ułamek, Madsen, Vaculik

=== Race-off Two ===
- 2 July 2011
- (Italy) Santa Marina Stadium, Lonigo
- Referee: Jesper Steentoft / Anthony Steele

Pos.	Rider	Points	Details
1	(Poland) (15) Grzegorz Walasek	13	(3,3,2,2,3)
2	(Poland) (14) Piotr Protasiewicz	12	(2,3,3,2,2)
3	(Denmark) (8) Bjarne Pedersen	11+3	(2,2,2,3,2)
4	(Finland) (5) Joonas Kylmäkorpi	11+2	(3,0,3,2,3)
5	(Denmark) (10) Jesper B. Monberg	11+1	(3,1,3,3,1)
6	(Sweden) (9) David Ruud	9+3	(0,3,0,3,3)
7	(Germany) (1) Kevin Wölbert	9+2	(3,1,2,3,0)
8	(United Kingdom) (3) Daniel King	8	(2,2,1,0,3)
9	(Australia) (6) Cameron Woodward	8	(1,2,3,0,2)
10	(Poland) (4) Przemysław Pawlicki	8	(1,3,2,1,1)
11	(Germany) (13) Tobias Kroner	7	(1,2,1,2,1)
12	(Czech Republic) (16) Tomáš Suchánek	4	(0,0,1,1,2)
13	(Denmark) (12) Peter Kildemand	3	(2,1,-,-,-)
14	(Italy) (2) Nicolas Covatti	2	(0,0,1,1,0)
15	(Hungary) (11) Norbert Magosi	2	(1,1,X,0,0)
16	(France) (17) Mathieu Tresarrieu	2	(0,0,1,1)
17	(Sweden) (7) Magnus Zetterström	0	(0,0,R,R,-)
—	(Argentina) (18) Lisandro R. Husman	—	—

== Grand Prix Challenge ==
- 20 August 2011
- (Sweden) Vetlanda Motorstadion, Vetlanda
- Referee: Marek Wojaczek / Jury President: Wolfgang Glas

Placing	Rider	Total	1	2	3	4	5	6	7	8	9	10	11	12	13	14	15	16	17	18	19	20	Pts	Pos	21
1	(Sweden) (14) Antonio Lindbäck	12				3		3					3		t							3	12	1	3
2	(Denmark) (9) Bjarne Pedersen	12			3		2						2					2		3			12	2	2
3	(Poland) (3) Piotr Protasiewicz	11	2						3				1				2				3		11	3	
4	(Slovakia) (15) Martin Vaculík	10				2			t			2						3	3				10	4	
5	(Poland) (13) Krzysztof Kasprzak	10				1	3							2		2					2		10	5	
6	(Sweden) (4) Peter Ljung	8	0							3				3				0				2	8	6	
7	(Denmark) (16) Leon Madsen	8				0				2	1						3			2			8	7	
8	(Poland) (5) Sebastian Ułamek	6		3			0					3					0					0	6	8	
9	(Poland) (7) Krzysztof Buczkowski	6		1					2					0	3					0			6	9	
10	(Finland) (11) Joonas Kylmäkorpi	6			t				1		3					1						1	6	10	
11	(Denmark) (1) Jesper B. Monberg	6	3				1				0				0				2				6	11	
12	(Poland) (10) Grzegorz Walasek	6			2			2						1			1		0				6	12	
13	(Slovenia) (6) Matej Žagar	6		2				1			2							1			0		6	13	
14	(Denmark) (12) Hans N. Andersen	5			1					1		1			1						1		5	14	
15	(Sweden) (2) Simon Gustafsson	4	t					0				0				3				1			4	15	
16	(Australia) (17) Davey Watt	3	1		0				0						2								3	16	
17	(Russia) (8) Victor Golubovski	1		0						0			0			x			1				1	17	
18	(Sweden) (18) David Ruud	0																					0	18	
Placing	Rider	Total	1	2	3	4	5	6	7	8	9	10	11	12	13	14	15	16	17	18	19	20	Pts	Pos	21

m - exclusion for exceeding two minute time allowance • t - exclusion for touching the tapes • x - other exclusion • e - retired or mechanical failure • f - fell • ns - non-starter • nc - non-classify

gate A - inside	gate B	gate C	gate D - outside

== See also ==
- 2011 Speedway Grand Prix
