= 2009 Speedway Grand Prix Qualification =

Seasons
- ← 2008 2010 →

The 2009 Individual Speedway World Championship Grand Prix Qualification Meetings are a series of speedway meetings used to determine the three riders and one reserve who qualify for the 2009 Speedway Grand Prix. The top eight riders finishing the 2008 Grand Prix series automatically qualify for 2009.

== Calendar ==
Race format
Gate	A (inside)	B	C	D (outside)
Heat No	Riders starting No
1	1	2	3	4
2	5	7	6	8
3	10	11	9	12
4	15	14	16	13
5	13	1	5	9
6	14	10	2	6
7	11	15	7	3
8	4	8	12	16
9	6	16	1	11
10	12	5	15	2
11	8	9	3	14
12	13	4	10	7
13	7	12	14	1
14	2	13	8	11
15	16	3	10	5
16	9	6	4	15
17	1	8	15	10
18	9	2	7	16
19	3	12	13	6
20	5	14	11	4

Date	Venue	Winner	
Domestic Qualifications
April 16	(Poland) Zielona Góra	(Poland) Adrian Miedziński	result
Quarter-finals
May 12	(Germany) Abensberg	(Australia) Davey Watt	result
May 31	(Croatia) Goričan	(Denmark) Charlie Gjedde	result
June 15	(Poland) Częstochowa	(Poland) Grzegorz Walasek	result
June 21	(Italy) Lonigo	(Australia) Ryan Sullivan	result
Semi-finals
July 5	(Italy) Terenzano	(United Kingdom) Lee Richardson	result
July 5	(Sweden) Motala	(Sweden) Peter Karlsson	result
Grand Prix Challenge
September 14	(Poland) Zielona Góra	(Denmark) Kenneth Bjerre	result

== Allocation ==
Qualifying Rules:

- Riders placed 1st to 7th + 1 reserve from each Qualifying Round will qualify for the semi-final.
- Riders placed 1st to 8th + 1 reserve from each Semi-Final will qualify for the Grand Prix Challenge. However, if no Polish rider qualifies to the Grand Prix Challenge, then only 7 riders + 1 reserve will qualify from Semi-Final 2.
- Riders will be balloted for the semi-finals and the Grand Prix Challenge.

FMNs	Total	+/-	Qualifying Rounds				Semi-Finals		Ch
FMNs	Total	+/-	1	2	3	4	1	2	Ch
FMNs	Total	+/-	(Germany)	(Croatia)	(Poland)	(Italy)	(Italy)	(Sweden)	(Poland)
Czech Republic (ACCR)	5	-1	2	1	2				
(United Kingdom) Great Britain (ACU)	6	-	2		2	2			
United States (AMA)	1	-				1			
Slovenia (AMZS)	2	-2		2					
Canada (CMA)	1	-				1			
Germany (DMSB)	5	+1	3	2					
Denmark (DMU)	6	-		2	1	2		1	
France (FFM)	2	+2	2						
Italy (FMI)	3	-				2	1		
Ukraine (FMU)	1	-			1				
Switzerland (FMS)	1	+1		1					
Croatia (HMS)	2	+1		2					
Netherlands (KNMV)	2	-	2						
Latvia (LaMSF)	2	-			2				
Australia (MA)	3	-		1		2			
Hungary (MAMS)	2	-1				2			
Russia (MFR)	4	+1		2	2				
Norway (NMF)	1	-1		1					
Austria (OeAMTC)	2	-	2						
Poland (PZM)	7	-1	1	2	3		1		
Slovakia (SMF)	1	-				1			
Finland (SML)	3	-			1	2			
Sweden (SVEMO)	6	-	2		2	1		1	
TOTAL	68	-	16	16	16	16	1	1	

== Domestic Qualifications ==
=== Poland ===
Domestic Qualifications for the 2009 Grand Prix and the 2008 Individual European Championship
Krajowe eliminacje do Grand Prix 2009 i IME

Qualifying Rules:

- Riders placed 1st to 8th + 1 reserve in the semi-finals qualify for the Final.
- Riders placed 1st to 6th in the Domestic Final qualify for the Grand Prix Qualification. The seventh Polish rider and reserve are nominated by the Main Commission of Speedway Sport in Poland (GKSŻ).
- Riders placed 1st to 7th in the Domestic Final qualify to the Individual European Championship. The eighth Polish rider and reserve are nominated by the Main Commission of Speedway Sport in Poland (GKSŻ).

Results:

- Semi-Final 1
- April 10, 2008 (4:00 pm CEST)
- (Poland) Poznań, Olimpia Poznań Stadium
- Referee: Maciej Spychała
- Best Time: 66.90 - Krzysztof Kasprzak in heat 1
- Attendance: 700
- Changes:
  - Adam Skórnicki (POZ) was replaced by Krzysztof Jabłoński (GDA)
  - Kamil Brzozowski (GRU) was replaced by 1st track reserve Rafał Trojanowski (POZ)
  - Maciej Piaszczyński (OST) was replaced by Janusz Kołodziej (TAR)

Pos.	Rider	Points	Details
1	(5) Walasek (ZIE)	15	(3,3,3,3,3)
2	(6) Dobrucki (ZIE)	13	(2,3,3,2,3)
3	(13) Mi.Szczepaniak (CZE)	11	(3,2,1,3,2)
4	(14) Gapiński (CZE)	11	(2,1,3,3,2)
5	(10) Jeleniewski (WRO)	11	(3,2,2,2,2)
6	(4) Kasprzak (LES)	10	(3,1,3,3,E)
7	(12) Świderski (RYB)	9	(2,3,2,1,1)
8	(19) Kołodziej (TAR)	5+3+3	(2,3)
9	(9) Słaboń (WRO)	5+3+2	(1,0,2,1,1)
10	(17) Jankowski (POZ)	5+2+3+1	(2,X,3)
11	(1) Jabłoński (GDA)	5+1+2+E	(2,1,1,0,1)
12	(11) Klecha (TAR)	5+2+1	(0,E,2,2,1)
13	(16) Okoniewski (BYD)	4	(1,0,0,1,2)
14	(3) Marcinkowski (POZ)	3	(0,3,E,T/-,0)
15	(8) Trojanowski (POZ)	3	(1,2,X,-,-)
16	(2) Pytel (POZ)	3	(1,0,1,1,d)
17	(15) Ma.Szczepaniak (CZE)	1	(0,1,0,0,0)
18	(18) Kłopot (POZ)	0	(0,0)
19	(7) Szombierski (OST)	0	(E,-,-,-,-)
(17) Jankowski: 7, 14, 18 (18) Kłopot: 12, 15 (19) Kołodziej: 13, 17; Times: Heat 1-4: 66.90 67.42 67.98 69.22; Heat 5-8: 67.70 68.10 68.40 68.64; Heat 9-12: 68.42 67.95 68.80 68.19; Heat 13-16: 68.10 70.29 67.94 68.08; Heat 17-20: 68.56 69.02 68.23 68.63; Heat 21-24: 68.18 69.36 69.09 68.87

- Semi-Final 2
- April 15, 2008 (4:30 pm CEST)
- (Poland) Toruń, Marian Rose Stadium
- Best Time: 63.31 - Sebastian Ułamek in 15th heat
- Referee: Ryszard Bryła (Zielona Góra)
- Attendance: 1,000
- Change:
  - Tomasz Chrzanowski (GDA) was replaced by Grzegorz Zengota (ZIE)
  - Reserves Jacek Rempała, Adam Kajoch and Marcin Rempała were replaced by Celmer, A.Wiśniewski and Lampkowski.

Pos.	Rider	Points	Details
1	(5) Ułamek (CZE)	13	(3,3,1,3,3)
2	(15) Jędrzejak (WRO)	12	(3,2,2,3,2)
3	(11) Kościecha (TOR)	11	(2,3,3,3,-)
4	(4) Buczkowski (BYD)	11	(3,3,1,2,2)
5	(1) Hampel (LES)	10	(2,0,2,3,3)
6	(10) Miedziński (TOR)	10	(3,2,3,2,0)
7	(12) Ząbik (TOR)	9	(1,2,3,T/-,3)
8	(9) Protasiewicz (ZIE)	7+3	(0,1,2,1,3)
9	(8) Zengota (ZIE)	7+2	(0,1,3,2,1)
10	(13) Stachyra (RZE)	6	(2,2,0,0,2)
11	(14) Gomólski (OST)	6	(1,1,1,2,1)
12	(7) Staszek (GRU)	5	(2,0,2,1,M)
13	(6) Puszakowski (GRU)	4	(1,3,X,-,-)
14	(2) Jędrzejewski (BYD)	3	(0,0,E,1,2)
15	(3) Hlib (GOR)	3	(1,1,0,1,0)
16	(17) Celmer (TOR)	2	(1,0,1)
17	(18) A.Wiśniewski (TOR)	1	(0,1,0)
18	(19) Lampkowski (TOR)	0	(0,0)
19	(16) Piszcz (DAU)	0	(X,0,E,-,-)
(17) Cemler: 9, 16, 19 (18) Wiśniewski: 13, 18, 20 (19) Lampkowski: 15, 18

- Final
- April 16, 2008 (5:00 pm CEST)
- (Poland) Zielona Góra, Municipal Stadium
- Best Time:
- Referee: Wojciech Grodzki (Opole)
- Attendance:

Pos.	Rider	Points	Details
	(2) Buczkowski (BYD)		
	(12) Dobrucki (ZIE)		
	(1) Gapiński (CZE)		
	(6) Hampel (LES)		
	(4) Jeleniewski (WRO)		
	(9) Jędrzejak (WRO)		
	(10) Kasprzak (LES)		
	(16) Kołodziej (TAR)		
	(11) Kościecha (TOR)		
	(8) Miedziński (TOR)		
	(13) Protasiewicz (ZIE)		
	(3) Mi.Szczepaniak (CZE)		
	(7) Świderski (RYB)		
	(5) Ułamek (CZE)		
	(14) Walasek (ZIE)		
	(15) Ząbik (TOR)		
	(17) Słaboń (WRO)		
	(18) Zengota (ZIE)		

== Qualifying rounds ==
=== Abensberg ===
- Qualifying Round 1
- May 12, 2008
- (Germany) Abensberg (2pm)
- Referee:
- Jury President:
- Attendance: ?
- Best Time: ?
- Qualify: 7 + 1R
- Replacements for injured riders:
- Henk Bos (NED) was replaced by Mark Stiekema (NED)
- Theo Pijper (FRA) was replaced by David Watt (AUS)
- Changes:
  - (5) NED (Jannick De Jong) › Rider 17
  - (16) NED (Mark Stiekema) › Rider 18

Pos.	Rider	Points	Details
1	(Australia) (1) Davey Watt	15	(3,3,3,3,3)
2	(Poland) (14) Rafał Dobrucki	11+3	(3,3,2,0,3)
3	(Czech Republic) (7) Adrian Rymel	11+2	(2,3,2,2,2)
4	(United Kingdom) (12) David Howe	11+1	(2,3,3,1,2)
5	(United Kingdom) (9) Edward Kennett	11+X/F	(3,1,3,1,3)
6	(Germany) (6) Tobias Kroner	10	(3,2,2,3,0)
7	(Sweden) (4) Mikael Max	10	(2,1,3,2,2)
8	(Germany) (13) Martin Smolinski	9	(E,2,1,3,3)
9	(Germany) (16) Richard Speiser	8	(2,2,1,2,1)
10	(Czech Republic) (3) Josef Franc	5	(0,E,1,3,1)
11	(Sweden) (15) Niklas Klingberg	5	(1,2,2,0,E)
12	(Germany) (8) Mathias Schultz	4	(1,0,E,2,1)
13	(Austria) (2) Manuel Hauzinger	4	(1,1,1,1,-)
14	(Austria) (10) Friedrich Wallner	3	(X/F,E,E,1,2)
15	(France) (11) Sebastien Tresarrieu	2	(1,1,0,0,0)
16	(Germany) (5) Frank Facher	1	(E,0,0,0,1)
17	(Germany) (17) Max Dilger	0	(E)

=== Częstochowa ===
- Qualifying Round 3
- June 15, 2008 (5:00 pm)
- (Poland) Częstochowa
- Referee: (Germany) Christian Froschauer
- Jury President: (Hungary) Janos Nadasdi
- Qualify: 7 + 1R
- Change: No 16 - Juha Hautamäki (FIN) was replaced by track reserve (Jarosław Hampel, POL)

Pos.	Rider	Points	Details
1	(Poland) (12) Grzegorz Walasek	14	(3,2,3,3,3)
2	(Czech Republic) (9) Lukáš Dryml	13	(2,2,3,3,3)
3	(Sweden) (14) Peter Karlsson	11	(3,2,1,2,3)
4	(United Kingdom) (11) Lee Richardson	10	(0,3,3,3,1)
5	(Czech Republic) (1) Aleš Dryml, Jr.	10	(3,3,0,1,3)
6	(Poland) (4) Sebastian Ułamek	10	(1,3,3,1,2)
7	(Sweden) (3) Daniel Nermark	9	(0,2,2,3,2)
8	(Russia) (6) Emil Saifutdinov	8	(3,3,1,0,1)
9	(Russia) (2) Denis Gizatullin	7	(2,0,1,2,2)
10	(Poland) (16) Jarosław Hampel	7	(1,1,2,2,1)
11	(Poland) (10) Janusz Kołodziej	6	(1,1,2,0,2)
12	(United Kingdom) (15) Oliver Allen	5	(0,E,2,2,1)
13	(Latvia) (5) Maksims Bogdanovs	3	(2,0,0,1,0)
14	(Denmark) (13) Nicolai Klindt	3	(2,1,C,T/-,0)
15	(Ukraine) (7) Andriy Karpov	3	(1,1,1,0,0)
16	(Latvia) (8) Leonids Paura	1	(0,0,0,1,0)
17	(Poland) (17) Borys Miturski	0	(0)

=== Goričan ===
- Qualifying Round 2
- May 31, 2008 (7:00 pm)
- (Croatia) Goričan
- Referee:
- Jury President:
- Qualify: 7 + 1R
- Change: No 8 Sirg Schutzbach (GER) was replaced by 1st track reserve

Pos.	Rider	Points	Details
1	(Denmark) (6) Charlie Gjedde	14	(2,3,3,3,3)
2	(Croatia) (1) Jurica Pavlic	13+3	(3,3,2,2,3)
3	(Slovenia) (5) Matej Žagar	13+2	(3,2,2,3,3)
4	(Poland) (2) Tomasz Jędrzejak	12	(2,2,3,2,3)
5	(Germany) (4) Christian Hefenbrock	10	(1,3,3,1,2)
6	(Australia) (13) Rory Schlein	10	(3,1,1,3,2)
7	(Germany) (15) Kevin Wölbert	9+3	(2,2,1,2,2)
8	(Denmark) (3) Kenneth Bjerre	9+2	(0,3,3,2,1)
9	(Czech Republic) (10) Luboš Tomíček, Jr.	8	(3,1,2,1,1)
10	(Russia) (7) Renat Gafurov	7	(1,1,0,3,2)
11	(Slovenia) (11) Izak Šantej	5	(2,0,1,1,1)
12	(Russia) (14) Radik Tibiejev	4	(1,0,2,1,X)
13	(Poland) (12) Michał Szczepaniak	3	(1,2,0,E,-)
14	(Norway) (16) Carl Johan Raugstad	2	(0,1,E,0,1)
15	(Croatia) (8) Nikola Pigac	1	(0,0,1,0,0)
16	(Croatia) (17) Ivan Vargek	0	(0,0,0)
17	(Croatia) (9) Nikola Martinec	0	(0,0,F,-,-)

=== Lonigo ===
- Qualifying Round 4
- June 21, 2008 (9:00 pm)
- (Italy) Lonigo
- Referee:
- Jury President:
- Qualify: 7 + 1R
- Changes:
  - No 7: Troy Batchelor (AUS) was replaced by Ryan Sullivan (AUS)
  - No 9: Joonas Kylmäkorpi (FIN) was replaced by track reserve (Andrea Maida, ITA)
  - No 11: Martin Vaculík (SVK) was replaced by Hynek Štichauer (CZE)
  - No 13: Billy Janniro (USA) was replaced by Maks Gregorič (SVN)
  - No 15: Laszlo Szatmari (HUN) was replaced by Zsolt Bencze (HUN)
  - No 16: Fredrik Lindgren (SWE) was replaced by Peter Ljung (SWE)

Pos.	Rider	Points	Details
1	(Australia) (7) Ryan Sullivan	14+3	(3,3,3,2,3)
2	(Hungary) (1) Matej Ferjan	14+2	(3,3,3,3,2)
3	(Sweden) (16) Peter Ljung	12+3	(3,3,2,2,2)
4	(Denmark) (4) Mads Korneliussen	12+2	(2,2,2,3,3)
5	(Denmark) (10) Jesper B. Monberg	10+3	(3,2,1,3,1)
6	(United Kingdom) (2) Daniel King	10+2	(1,3,2,3,1)
7	(United Kingdom) (8) Simon Stead	10+1	(1,1,3,2,3)
8	(Italy) (5) Mattia Carpanese	10+0	(2,2,3,1,2)
9	(Australia) (3) Chris Holder	5	(X,E,2,E,3)
10	(Italy) (9) Andrea Maida	5	(2,0,1,2,0)
11	(Slovenia) (13) Maks Gregorič	5	(1,1,0,1,2)
12	(Czech Republic) (11) Hynek Štichauer	4	(1,2,X,0,1)
13	(Canada) (6) Kyle Legault	3	(0,1,1,1,0)
14	(Finland) (14) Kai Laukkanen	2	(2,0,0,E,0)
15	(Italy) (12) Marco Gregnanin	2	(0,0,1,E,1)
16	(Hungary) (15) Zsolt Bencze	1	(0,1,0,0,0)
-	(Italy) (17) Daniele Tessari	-	-
-	(Italy) (18) Alessandro Milanese	-	-

== Semi-finals ==
=== Terenzano ===
- Semi-Final 1
- July 5, 2008 (9:00 pm)
- (Italy) Terenzano
- Referee:
- Jury President:
- No 8 Rafał Dobrucki (POL) was injury - was replaced by track reserve
- Qualify: 8 + 1R

Pos.	Rider	Points	Details
1	(United Kingdom) (7) Lee Richardson	12+3	(3,2,3,2,2)
2	(Denmark) (9) Jesper B. Monberg	12+2	(0,3,3,3,3)
3	(Sweden) (13) Peter Ljung	11+3	(3,2,2,1,3)
4	(Poland) (1) Sebastian Ułamek	11+2	(3,0,2,3,3)
5	(Slovenia) (2) Matej Žagar	10	(2,2,3,3,0)
6	(Denmark) (11) Charlie Gjedde	10	(2,3,3,2,0)
7	(Australia) (5) Ryan Sullivan	10	(2,1,1,3,3)
8	(Poland) (12) Adrian Miedziński	9+3	(3,1,2,1,2)
9	(Croatia) (16) Jurica Pavlic	9+2	(2,3,1,2,1)
10	(Czech Republic) (4) Lukáš Dryml	8	(1,2,1,2,2)
11	(Sweden) (14) Mikael Max	6	(0,3,2,0,1)
12	(United Kingdom) (10) David Howe	4	(1,0,0,1,2)
13	(Germany) (15) Christian Hefenbrock	3	(1,1,0,1,FX)
14	(Germany) (6) Kevin Wölbert	3	(1,1,X,0,1)
15	(Italy) (8) Mattia Carpanese	2	(0,0,1,0,1)
16	(Italy) (3) Guglielmo Franchetti	0	(T,E,0,0,FX)
17 -	(Russia) (17) Emil Saifutdinov	-	-

=== Motala ===
- Semi-Final 2
- July 5, 2008 (4:00 pm)
- (Sweden) Motala
- Referee:
- Jury President:
- Qualify: 8 + 1R
- No 4 Davey Watt (AUS) was replaced by track reserve

Pos.	Rider	Points	Details
1	(Sweden) (1) Peter Karlsson	14	(3,3,3,2,3)
2	(Sweden) (3) Jonas Davidsson	11+3	(E,2,3,3,3)
3	(Denmark) (10) Niels Kristian Iversen	11+2	(3,3,2,2,1)
4	(Poland) (15) Grzegorz Walasek	9	(3,3,2,1,0)
5	(Hungary) (5) Matej Ferjan	9	(3,2,0,1,3)
6	(Sweden) (9) Daniel Nermark	9	(1,1,1,3,3)
7	(Denmark) (4) Kenneth Bjerre	9	(2,3,1,2,1)
8	(Poland) (8) Tomasz Jędrzejak	9	(2,1,2,2,2)
9	(Denmark) (2) Mads Korneliussen	8+2	(1,2,1,3,1)
10	(United Kingdom) (12) Edward Kennett	8+2	(0,2,3,1,2)
11	(United Kingdom) (13) Daniel King	7	(2,0,3,1,1)
12	(Czech Republic) (11) Aleš Dryml, Jr.	7	(2,1,2,0,2)
13	(United Kingdom) (7) Simon Stead	6	(1,0,0,3,2)
14	(Australia) (16) Rory Schlein	1	(1,0,0,0,0)
15	(Czech Republic) (14) Adrian Rymel	1	(E,1,0,0,0)
16	(Germany) (6) Tobias Kroner	1	(0,T,1,0,0)
-	(Germany) (17) Martin Smolinski	-	-

== Grand Prix Challenge ==
- Grand Prix Challenge
- September 14, 2008
- (Poland) Zielona Góra
- Referee: (United Kingdom) Anthony Steele
- Jury President: (Sweden) Christer Bergström
- Best Time: 59.66 sec - (Denmark) Kenneth Bjerre in Heat 3
- Change:
  - (2) (Sweden) Jonas Davidsson → (18) Korneliussen
  - (15) (Sweden) Daniel Nermark → (17) Pavlic

Placing	Rider	Total	1	2	3	4	5	6	7	8	9	10	11	12	13	14	15	16	17	18	19	20	Pts	Pos	21
1	(Denmark) (12) Kenneth Bjerre	12			3					1		2			3						3		12	Q1	3
2	(Poland) (16) Grzegorz Walasek	12				3				2	2						3			2			12	Q2	2
3	(Poland) (8) Sebastian Ułamek	12		3						3			0			3			3				12	Q3	1
4	(Denmark) (10) Niels Kristian Iversen	11			2			3						3			1		2				11	4	
5	(Poland) (14) Tomasz Jędrzejak	11				2		2					2		2							3	11	5	
6	(Australia) (1) Ryan Sullivan	10	3				3				3				1				F2				10	6	
7	(Denmark) (9) Jesper B. Monberg	10			1		1						3					2		3			10	7	
8	(Poland) (3) Adrian Miedziński	9	1						3				1				2				2		9	8	
9	(Croatia) (15) Jurica Pavlic	7				0			0			3						3	1				7	9	
10	(Slovenia) (5) Matej Žagar	7		2			2					1					0					2	7	10	
11	(Denmark) (2) Mads Korneliussen	5	2					0				F4				2				1			5	11	
12	(Sweden) (11) Peter Karlsson	4			0				2		1					1						0	4	12	
13	(United Kingdom) (13) Lee Richardson	3				1	E4							2		E4					0		3	13	
14	(Denmark) (6) Charlie Gjedde	3		0				1			0							1			1		3	14	
15	(Hungary) (4) Matej Ferjan	2	0							E4				1				E4				1	2	15	
16	(Sweden) (7) Peter Ljung	2		1					1					F4	-					-			2	16	
17	(Czech Republic) (17) Aleš Dryml, Jr.	0													0					0			0	17	
Placing	Rider	Total	1	2	3	4	5	6	7	8	9	10	11	12	13	14	15	16	17	18	19	20	Pts	Pos	21

m - exclusion for exceeding two minute time allowance • t - exclusion for touching the tapes • x - other exclusion • e - retired or mechanical failure • f - fell • ns - non-starter • nc - non-classify

gate A - inside	gate B	gate C	gate D - outside

Heat after heat:

1. (60.60) Sullivan, Korneliussen, Miedziński, Ferjan
2. (59.75) Ułamek, Zagar, Ljung, Gjedde
3. (59.66) Bjerre, Iversen, Monberg, Karlsson
4. (60.47) Walasek, Jędrzejak, Richardson, Pavlić
5. (60.19) Sullivan, Zagar, Monberg, Richardson (E4)
6. (60.20) Iversen, Jędrzejak, Gjedde, Korneliussen
7. (61.10) Miedziński, Karlsson, Ljung, Pavlić
8. (60.34) Ułamek, Walasek, Bjerre, Ferjan (E4)
9. (61.21) Sullivan, Walasek, Karlsson, Gjedde (E4)
10. (60.22) Pavlić, Bjerre, Zagar, Korneliussen (F4)
11. (60.94) Monberg, Jędrzejak, Miedziński, Ułamek (d4)
12. (60.15) Iversen, Richardson, Ferjan, Ljung (F3)
13. (61.31) Bjerre, Jędrzejak, Sullivan, A.Dryml (E4)
14. (60.51) Ułamek, Korneliussen, Karlsson, Richardson (E4)
15. (60.97) Walasek, Miedziński, Iversen, Zagar
16. (60.28) Pavlić, Monberg, Gjedde, Ferjan (E4)
17. (60.69) Ułamek, Iversen, Pavlić, Sullivan (F)
18. (60.90) Monberg, Walasek, Korneliussen, A.Dryml
19. (60.97) Bjerre, Miedziński, Gjedde, Richardson (E3)
20. (61.69) Jędrzejak, Zagar, Ferjan, Karlsson
  Run-Off:
21. (60.88) Bjerre, Walasek, Ułamek

Pos.	Rider	Points	Details
1	(Denmark) (12) Kenneth Bjerre	12+3	(3,1,2,3,3)
2	(Poland) (16) Grzegorz Walasek	12+2	(3,2,2,3,2)
3	(Poland) (8) Sebastian Ułamek	12+1	(3,3,0,3,3)
4	(Denmark) (10) Niels Kristian Iversen	11	(2,3,3,1,2)
5	(Poland) (14) Tomasz Jędrzejak	11	(2,2,2,2,3)
6	(Australia) (1) Ryan Sullivan	10	(3,3,3,1,F2)
7	(Denmark) (9) Jesper B. Monberg	10	(1,1,3,2,3)
8	(Poland) (3) Adrian Miedziński	9	(1,3,1,2,2)
9	(Slovenia) (5) Matej Žagar	7	(2,2,1,0,2)
10	(Croatia) (15) Jurica Pavlic	7	(0,0,3,3,1)
11	(Denmark) (2) Mads Korneliussen	5	(2,0,F,2,1)
12	(Sweden) (11) Peter Karlsson	4	(0,2,1,1,0)
13	(Denmark) (6) Charlie Gjedde	3	(0,1,0,1,1)
14	(United Kingdom) (13) Lee Richardson	3	(1,F,2,E4,0)
15	(Hungary) (4) Matej Ferjan	2	(0,E4,1,E4,1)
16	(Sweden) (7) Peter Ljung	2	(1,1,F4,-,-)
17	(Czech Republic) (17) Aleš Dryml, Jr.	0	(0,0)

== References and notes ==
- pzm.pl - FIM Calendar 2008
- pzm.pl - Allocation

== See also ==
- Speedway Grand Prix
