= 2011 Speedway Grand Prix Qualification =

Seasons
- ← 2010 2012 →

The 2011 Individual Speedway World Championship Grand Prix Qualification were a series of motorcycle speedway meetings used to determine the three riders who qualified for the 2011 Speedway Grand Prix. The top eight riders finishing the 2010 Grand Prix series automatically qualified for 2011. The final round of qualification – the Grand Prix Challenge – took place on 21 August 2010, in Vojens, Denmark.

Artem Laguta and Antonio Lindbäck finished in the top two positions, and thus automatically qualified for the 2011 Speedway Grand Prix season. The third spot was decided in a three-way run-off, with Fredrik Lindgren defeating Janusz Kołodziej and Magnus Zetterström.

== Qualifying rounds ==
=== Round One ===
- 12 June 2010
- DEN Fjelsted, Region of Southern Denmark
- Fjelsted Speedway Center (Length: 300 m)
- Referee: (United Kingdom) J. Lawrence
- Jury President: (Finland) I. Teromaa
- References
- Change:

Draw 12. (United States) Kenny Ingalls → Reserve 17

Pos.	Rider	Points	Details
1	(Poland) (13) Krzysztof Kasprzak	13	(2,3,3,2,3)
2	(Denmark) (2) Leon Madsen	11+3	(2,3,1,3,2)
3	(Denmark) (8) Nicolai Klindt	11+2	(3,3,3,1,1)
4	(Sweden) (9) Thomas H. Jonasson	10	(1,1,2,3,3)
5	(Denmark) (16) Niels Kristian Iversen	10	(3,2,1,3,1)
6	(Sweden) (7) Jonas Davidsson	9	(1,3,2,3,0)
7	(United Kingdom) (3) Tai Woffinden	9	(3,1,1,2,2)
8	(Finland) (15) Kauko Nieminen	8	(1,2,2,0,3)
9	(Sweden) (11) Fredrik Lindgren	7+3	(2,F,2,0,3)
10	(United States) (6) Ryan Fisher	7+2	(2,1,3,1,0)
11	(United Kingdom) (10) Edward Kennett	7+1	(3,2,1,1,0)
12	(Canada) (1) Kyle Legault	7+X	(1,2,0,2,2)
13	(Russia) (4) Renat Gafurov	5	(X,1,0,2,2)
14	(Denmark) (17) Claus Vissing	4	(0,0,3,X,1)
15	(Germany) (14) Tobias Kroner	2	(0,0,0,1,1)
16	(Norway) (5) Rune Sola	0	(0,0,0,0,0)
—	(Denmark) (18) Michael Jepsen Jensen	—	—

=== Round Two ===
- 12 June 2010
- ITA Terenzano, Friuli-Venezia Giulia
- Pista “Olimpia” - Terenzano (Length: 400 m)
- Referee: (United Kingdom) Frank Ziegler
- Jury President: (United Kingdom) Noel Anthony
- References

Pos.	Rider	Points	Details
1	(United Kingdom) (9) Simon Stead	12	(2,3,1,3,3)
2	(Germany) (8) Martin Smolinski	11+3	(2,3,2,2,2)
3	(Australia) (13) Rory Schlein	11+2	(3,1,3,3,1)
4	(Australia) (5) Cory Gathercole	11+1	(3,0,3,2,3)
5	(Germany) (1) Christian Hefenbrock	11+0	(3,2,1,2,3)
6	(United Kingdom) (11) Lee Richardson	10	(3,3,2,0,2)
7	(Poland) (16) Grzegorz Zengota	10	(1,2,3,3,1)
8	(Italy) (12) Guglielmo Franchetti	9	(1,0,2,3,3)
9	(Argentina) (2) Emiliano Sanchez	8+3	(2,2,1,1,2)
10	(Slovakia) (14) Martin Vaculík	8+N	(2,3,3,0,N)
11	(Italy) (7) Marco Gregnanin	6	(1,2,2,1,0)
12	(Argentina) (6) Felipe Covatti	5	(0,1,0,2,2)
13	(France) (3) Théo Di Palma	3	(1,1,0,1,0)
14	(Italy) (4) Mattia Cavicchioli	3	(0,1,1,1,-)
15	(Argentina) (15) Lucas Allende	1	(0,0,0,0,1)
16	(Italy) (18) Jonathan Seren	1	(0,1)
17	(Italy) (17) Andrea Baroni	0	(0,0)
18	(Austria) (10) Manuel Hauzinger	0	(0,X,-,-,-)

Reserve 17 rode in Heats 12 and 17
Reserve 18 rode in Heat 15 and 20

=== Round Three ===
- 12 June 2010
- HUN Miskolc, Borsod-Abaúj-Zemplén County
- Speedway Arena (Length: 367 m)
- Referee: (United Kingdom) Mick Bates
- Jury President: (Poland) Andrzej Grodzki
- References
- Changes:

Draw 4. (Netherlands) → (Slovenia)
Draw 13. (Netherlands) → (Czech Republic)

Pos.	Rider	Points	Details
1	(Poland) (15) Janusz Kołodziej	12+3	(3,2,3,3,1)
2	(Czech Republic) (1) Aleš Dryml, Jr.	12+2	(3,2,1,3,3)
3	(Czech Republic) (16) Lukáš Dryml	11	(F,2,3,3,3)
4	(Sweden) (11) Magnus Zetterström	10	(3,3,X,3,1)
5	(Denmark) (7) Mads Korneliussen	9	(3,1,3,2,0)
6	(Australia) (3) Troy Batchelor	9	(1,0,3,2,3)
7	(Poland) (8) Adrian Miedziński	9	(0,3,2,2,2)
8	(Sweden) (9) Daniel Nermark	8	(1,3,1,2,2)
9	(Hungary) (14) Matej Ferjan	8	(2,3,0,0,3)
10	(Australia) (12) Darcy Ward	7+3	(2,1,2,1,1)
11	(Hungary) (6) József Tabaka	7+2	(1,2,2,T/-,2)
12	(Denmark) (5) Morten Risager	6	(2,1,0,1,2)
13	(Slovenia) (2) Aleksander Čonda	6	(2,1,1,1,1)
14	(Czech Republic) (13) Tomáš Suchánek	3	(1,0,2,0,0)
15	(Slovenia) (4) Samo Kukovica	1	(F,0,1,0,0)
16	(Hungary) (17) Norbert Magosi	1	(1)
17	(Slovenia) (10) Matic Voldrih	0	(0,0,0,0,0)

=== Round Four ===
- 12 June 2010
- RUS Balakovo, Saratov Oblast
- Stadium “Trud” (Length: 380 m)
- Referee: (Poland) Marek Wojaczek
- Jury President: (Slovenia) Boris Kotnjek
- References
- Changes:

Draw 2. (Slovenia) → (Russia)
Draw 8. (Finland) → (Poland)
Draw 10. (Finland) → (Russia)
Draw 15. (Germany) → (Ukraine)
Draw 11. (Poland) Krzysztof Buczkowski → Reserve 17

Pos.	Rider	Points	Details
1	(Russia) (3) Grigory Laguta	15	(3,3,3,3,3)
2	(Russia) (10) Artem Laguta	13	(3,3,3,1,3)
3	(Russia) (9) Denis Gizatullin	12+3	(2,3,1,3,3)
4	(Poland) (8) Tomasz Jędrzejak	12+2	(3,2,2,3,2)
5	(Poland) (4) Grzegorz Walasek	12+N	(2,3,2,2,3)
6	(Ukraine) (16) Andriy Karpov	10	(3,1,3,2,1)
7	(Russia) (12) Roman Povazhny	8	(R,0,3,3,2)
8	(Russia) (2) Andrey Kudryashov	7	(1,F,2,2,2)
9	(Latvia) (14) Jevgēņijs Karavackis	6+3	(2,2,0,2,X)
10	(Czech Republic) (5) Jan Jaroš	6+2	(2,1,1,R,2)
11	(Latvia) (6) Vjačeslavs Giruckis	5	(0,1,2,1,1)
12	(Russia) (17) Denis Nosov	4	(T/-,1,1,1,1)
13	(Ukraine) (15) Kiril Tcukanov	3	(1,2,0,0,0)
14	(Czech Republic) (13) Filip Šitera	3	(R,2,1,R,-)
15	(Ukraine) (7) Vladimir Dubinin	2	(1,0,0,1,0)
16	(Germany) (1) Tobias Busch	1	(0,0,0,0,1)
17	(Russia) (18) Vladimir Borodulin	1	(1,0)

=== Round Five ===
- 12 June 2010
- CRO Goričan, Međimurje County
- Stadium Milenium (Length: 305 m)
- Referee: (Czech Republic) Pavel Vana
- Jury President: (Hungary) Janos Nadasdi
- References
- Changes:

(Belgium) (Finland) → (Germany) (Slovenia)
Draw 17. (Croatia) → (Slovenia)

Pos.	Rider	Points	Details
1	(United Kingdom) (12) Chris Harris	14+3	(3,3,2,3,3)
2	(Slovenia) (14) Matej Žagar	14+2	(3,3,3,2,3)
3	(Croatia) (5) Jurica Pavlic	13	(3,3,3,3,1)
4	(Poland) (13) Rafał Dobrucki	11	(2,2,3,2,2)
5	(Sweden) (2) David Ruud	10	(1,2,1,3,3)
6	(Poland) (9) Tomasz Gapiński	10	(2,1,2,3,2)
7	(Denmark) (8) Patrick Hougaard	8	(2,2,1,0,3)
8	(Germany) (7) Kevin Wölbert	8	(1,3,2,1,1)
9	(Sweden) (11) Antonio Lindbäck	8	(1,2,2,1,2)
10	(Czech Republic) (6) Matěj Kůs	6	(0,0,3,2,1)
11	(Denmark) (1) Kenni Arendt Larsen	5	(3,0,0,0,2)
12	(Czech Republic) (10) Josef Franc	4	(0,1,0,2,1)
13	(Slovenia) (16) Ales Kraljic	4	(1,1,1,1,0)
14	(Czech Republic) (3) Martin Málek	3	(2,1,0,0,0)
15	(Slovenia) (4) Matija Duh	2	(0,0,1,1,0)
16	(Croatia) (15) Renato Cvetko	0	(0,0,0,0,0)
—	(Slovenia) (17) Remih Aljoša	—	—

== Race-offs ==
=== Race-off One ===
- 3 July 2010
- POL Ostrów Wielkopolski, Greater Poland Voivodeship
- Municipal Stadium (Length: 372 m)
- Referee: (United Kingdom) Craig Ackroyd
- Jury President: (Hungary) Janos Nadasdi
- References
- Change:

Draw 9. (Argentina) Emiliano Sanchez → Reserve 17

Pos.	Rider	Points	Details
1	(Sweden) (2) Antonio Lindbäck	12+3	(3,0,3,3,3)
2	(Sweden) (7) Thomas H. Jonasson	12+2	(3,3,1,3,2)
3	(Sweden) (3) Magnus Zetterström	11+3	(1,2,2,3,3)
4	(Poland) (6) Grzegorz Walasek	11+2	(2,2,2,3,2)
5	(Poland) (10) Sebastian Ułamek *	11+1	(1,3,3,1,3)
6	(Russia) (12) Roman Povazhny	10	(3,3,1,2,1)
7	(Poland) (13) Rafał Dobrucki	9	(3,2,2,2,0)
8	(Australia) (16) Troy Bachelor	9	(1,2,3,2,1)
9	(Slovenia) (15) Matej Žagar	8	(2,0,2,2,2)
10	(Australia) (14) Rory Schlein	6	(0,1,1,1,3)
11	(Denmark) (8) Patrick Hougaard	4	(0,0,3,0,1)
12	(Sweden) (5) Daniel Nermark	4	(1,3,0,F,-)
13	(Australia) (17) Darcy Ward	4	(2,1,0,1,0)
14	(United Kingdom) (11) Tai Woffinden	4	(0,1,0,1,2)
15	(Poland) (1) Krzysztof Kasprzak	3	(2,0,1,0,M)
16	(United Kingdom) (4) Lee Richardson	1	(0,1,0,-,-)
17	(Czech Republic) (18) Matej Kůs	0	(0,R)

=== Race-off Three ===
- 3 July 2010
- RUS Tolyatti, Samara Oblast
- Anatoly Stepanov Stadium (Length: 353 m)
- Referee: (Denmark) J. Steentoft
- Jury President: (Slovenia) B. Kotnjek
- References
- Changes:

Draw 3. (Denmark) Mads Korneliussen → (18) (Czech Republic) Jan Jaroš → None
Draw 6. (Denmark) Nicolai Klindt → (United Kingdom) Edward Kennett → Vlasov
Draw 11. (Sweden) injury Jonas Davidsson → (Canada) Kyle Legault → (17) Gafurov
Draw 17. (United States) Ryan Fisher → Gafurov
Draw 4. (Germany) Kevin Wölbert → R.Ivanov
Draw 8. (Finland) Kauko Nieminen → Sayfutdinov
Draw 9. (Germany) Martin Smolinski → Darkin
Draw 10. (Hungary) Matej Ferjan → Biezczastnow

Pos.	Rider	Points	Details
1	(Poland) (14) Tomasz Gapiński	15	(3,3,3,3,3)
2	(Russia) (15) Grigory Laguta	13	(2,3,2,3,3)
3	(Ukraine) (5) Andrey Karpov	12+3	(3,3,3,3,Fx)
4	(Poland) (13) Janusz Kołodziej	12+2	(1,2,3,3,3)
5	(Russia) (12) Artem Laguta	11	(3,3,1,2,2)
6	(Poland) (1) Adrian Miedziński	9	(2,1,3,1,2)
7	(Russia) (2) Denis Gizatullin	8	(3,R,0,2,3)
8	(Russia) (11) Renat Gafurov	8	(2,2,1,1,2)
9	(Russia) (6) Simon Vlasov	7	(1,2,2,1,1)
10	(Russia) (9) Sergey Darkin	6	(Fx,0,2,2,2)
11	(Russia) (10) Oleg Biezczastnow	6	(1,1,1,2,1)
12	(Russia) (4) Roman Ivanov	5	(1,2,2,0,X)
13	(Russia) (7) Daniil Ivanov *	4	(2,1,0,R,1)
14	(Russia) (8) Denis Saifutdinov	1	(R,1,X,N,N)
15	(Latvia) (16) Jevgēņijs Karavackis	0	(R,N,N,N,N)

=== Race-off Two ===
- 3 July 2010
- ITA Lonigo, Veneto
- Pista Santa Marina (Length: 334 m)
- Referee: (Poland) Marek Wojaczek
- Jury President: (France) Christian Bouin
- References
- Change:

Draw 18. Kennett moved to Race-off Three → Gregnanin
Draw 17. (Slovakia) Martin Vaculík → None

Pos.	Rider	Points	Details
1	(United Kingdom) (13) Chris Harris	15	(3,3,3,3,3)
2	(Sweden) (12) Fredrik Lindgren	12	(2,3,3,2,2)
3	(Denmark) (4) Leon Madsen	11+3	(2,1,2,3,3)
4	(Denmark) (8) Niels Kristian Iversen	11+2	(2,2,3,1,3)
5	(United Kingdom) (10) Simon Stead	9+3	(3,3,0,3,Fx)
6	(Czech Republic) (5) Lukáš Dryml	9+2	(3,0,2,2,2)
7	(Croatia) (7) Jurica Pavlic	9+1	(0,2,1,3,3)
8	(Poland) (2) Grzegorz Zengota	8	(3,0,1,2,2)
9	(Czech Republic) (11) Aleš Dryml, Jr.	6	(1,3,1,0,1)
10	(Poland) (16) Tomasz Jędrzejak	6	(2,0,2,1,1)
11	(Italy) (1) Guglielmo Franchetti	5	(1,1,3,0,Fx)
12	(Russia) (9) Andrey Kudryashov	5	(F,2,1,2,0)
13	(Australia) (6) Cory Gathercole	5	(1,2,X,1,1)
14	(Germany) (14) Christian Hefenbrock	5	(1,1,2,1,0)
15	(Italy) (18) Marco Gregnanin	3	(1,0,0,2)
16	(Italy) (3) Mattia Carpanese *	0	(0,0,0,0,0)
17	(Sweden) (15) David Ruud	0	(Fx,-,-,-,-)

Ułamek, Carpanese and Ivanov was seeded in the Race-Offs.

== Grand Prix Challenge ==
- 21 August 2010
- DEN Vojens, Region of Southern Denmark
- Vojens Speedway Center (Length: 300 m)
- Referee: (United Kingdom) Craig Ackroyd
- Jury President: (Poland) Andrzej Grodzki
- References

Placing	Rider	Total	1	2	3	4	5	6	7	8	9	10	11	12	13	14	15	16	17	18	19	20	Pts	Pos	21	22
1	(Russia) (12) Artem Laguta	12			3					0		3			3						3		12	1		3
2	(Sweden) (11) Antonio Lindbäck	12			1				3		3					3						2	12	2		2
3	(Sweden) (2) Fredrik Lindgren	11	3					3				2				1				2			11	3	3	
4	(Poland) (8) Janusz Kołodziej	11		3						3			3			2			0				11	4	2	
5	(Sweden) (5) Magnus Zetterström	11		2			3					0					3					3	11	5	1	
6	(Sweden) (15) Thomas H. Jonasson	9				2			2			1						1	3				9	6		
7	(United Kingdom) (9) Chris Harris	8			0		1						2					2		3			8	7		
8	(Denmark) (14) Niels Kristian Iversen	7				3		2					1		1							0	7	8		
9	(Ukraine) (10) Andrey Karpov	7			2			1						2			1		1				7	9		
10	(Russia) (13) Roman Povazhny	6				f	2							3		t					1		6	10		
11	(Russia) (1) Grigory Laguta	6	2				0				2				0				2				6	11		
12	(United Kingdom) (16) Simon Stead	6				1				1	1						2			1			6	12		
13	(Denmark) (6) Leon Madsen	5		0				0			0							3			2		5	13		
14	(Poland) (7) Sebastian Ułamek	4		1					0					1	2					0			4	14		
15	(Poland) (4) Tomasz Gapiński	3	0							2				0				0				1	3	15		
16	(Poland) (3) Grzegorz Walasek	2	1						1				0				0				0		2	16		
17	(Czech Republic) (17) Lukáš Dryml	0														0							0	17		
Placing	Rider	Total	1	2	3	4	5	6	7	8	9	10	11	12	13	14	15	16	17	18	19	20	Pts	Pos	21	22

m - exclusion for exceeding two minute time allowance • t - exclusion for touching the tapes • x - other exclusion • e - retired or mechanical failure • f - fell • ns - non-starter • nc - non-classify

gate A - inside	gate B	gate C	gate D - outside

== See also ==
- 2011 Speedway Grand Prix
