= 2010 Individual Speedway European Championship =

10th UEM Individual Speedway European Championship season

Seasons
- ← 2009 2011 →

The 2010 Individual European Championship will be the 10th UEM Individual Speedway European Championship season. The final took place on 4 September 2010 in Tarnów, Poland. The defending champion is Renat Gafurov from Russia.

== Qualifying rounds ==
=== QR One - Mureck ===
- 1 May 2010
- AUT Mureck, Styria
- Stadium Mureck (Length: 389 m)
- Referee and Jury President: (France) Thierry Bouin
- References
- Change:

Draw 11. (Belgium) → (Slovenia)

Pos.	Rider	Points	Details
1	(Russia) (9) Simon Vlasov	14	(3,3,3,3,2)
2	(Poland) (13) Robert Miśkowiak	12+3	(3,2,3,3,1)
3	(Russia) (16) Aleksiej Charczenko	12+2	(R,3,3,3,3)
4	(Czech Republic) (3) Matěj Kůs	11	(3,3,2,1,2)
5	(Poland) (6) Rafał Trojanowski	11	(3,1,2,2,3)
6	(Germany) (1) Tobias Busch	9	(2,0,1,3,3)
7	(Austria) (2) Manuel Hauzinger	9	(0,3,3,2,1)
8	(Austria) (10) Fritz Wallner	9	(1,2,2,2,2)
9	(Germany) (4) Roberto Haupt	7	(1,2,R,1,3)
10	(Slovenia) (11) Samo Kukovica	7	(2,2,0,1,2)
11	(Slovenia) (5) Matija Duh	6	(2,1,2,0,1)
12	(Romania) (7) Alexandru Toma	4	(1,1,1,1,0)
13	(Romania) (15) Adrian Sorin Gheorghe	3	(2,Fx,1,0,0)
14	(Croatia) (14) Renato Cvetko	3	(R,0,1,2,0)
15	(Norway) (8) Tord Selberg	2	(0,1,0,R,1)
16	(Norway) (12) Stein Roar Pedersen	0	(0,0,0,R,0)

According to speedway.org, Kukovica scored 6 points (1,2,0,1,2), and Wallner scoring 10 points (2,2,2,2,2).

=== QR Two - Diedenbergen ===
- 30 May 2010
- GER Diedenbergen, Hesse
- Rhein Main Stadion (Length: 400 m)
- Referee and Jury President: (Russia) Andrey Savin
- References
- Changes:

Draw 6. (Finland) → (Slovenia)
Draw 12. (Hungary) → (Germany)

Pos.	Rider	Points	Details
1	(Hungary) (15) Matej Ferjan	14+3	(2,3,3,3,3)
2	(Poland) (13) Michał Szczepaniak	14+2	(3,3,3,2,3)
3	(Czech Republic) (2) Filip Šitera	13	(2,3,2,3,3)
4	(Croatia) (5) Dino Kovacic	11	(3,1,1,3,3)
5	(Poland) (4) Adrian Gomólski	10	(3,2,1,2,2)
6	(Russia) (1) Lenar Nigmatzjanow	10	(1,2,3,2,2)
7	(Denmark) (7) Simon Nielsen	7	(2,2,0,3,0)
8	(Italy) (3) Mattia Carpanese	7	(0,1,2,2,2)
9	(France) (10) David Bellego	6	(1,2,2,R,1)
10	(Germany) (16) Tobias Kroner	5	(T,3,R,R,2)
11	(Germany) (9) Christian Hefenbrock	5	(T/-,R,3,1,1)
12	(Slovenia) (6) Jan Halabrin	5	(1,1,2,0,1)
13	(Germany) (12) Erik Pudel	4	(3,1,0,N,N)
14	(Germany) (17) Matthias Bartz	4	(2,0,1,1,0)
15	(Netherlands) (11) Henk Bos	2	(0,0,1,0,1)
16	(France) (14) Xavier Muratet	2	(1,0,0,1,0)
17	(Austria) (8) Johannes Fiala	0	(R,-,-,-,-)

=== QR Three - Lviv ===
- 26 June 2010
- UKR Lviv, Lviv Oblast
- Stadium "Ska" (Length: 382 m)
- Referee and Jury President: (Poland) Wojciech Grodzki
- References
- Change:

Draw 9. (Slovakia) → (Czech Republic)
Draw 16. (Finland) → (Czech Republic)

Pos.	Rider	Points	Details
1	(Ukraine) (1) Andriy Karpov	15	(3,3,3,3,3)
2	(Russia) (13) Sergey Darkin	12	(2,2,3,3,2)
3	(Latvia) (10) Ķasts Poudžuks	11+3	(3,3,1,3,1)
4	(Slovenia) (5) Aleksander Čonda	11+2	(3,1,2,2,3)
5	(Ukraine) (8) Aleksandr Borodaj	10	(1,2,3,2,2)
6	(Latvia) (3) Leonīds Paura	10	(2,2,2,1,3)
7	(Czech Republic) (15) Tomáš Suchánek	9	(3,3,1,2,0)
8	(Czech Republic) (7) Martin Málek	9	(2,0,2,2,3)
9	(Russia) (4) Daniil Ivanov	8+3	(R,3,0,3,2)
10	(Slovenia) (12) Matic Voldrih	8+2	(2,1,3,1,1)
11	(Ukraine) (11) Yaroslav Polyuhovich	6	(1,1,2,1,1)
12	(Bulgaria) (14) Milen Manev	4	(1,2,1,0,0)
13	(Italy) (2) Aleksandro Novello	3	(F,1,0,0,2)
14	(Czech Republic) (16) Martin Gavenda	2	(F,0,1,0,1)
15	(Czech Republic) (9) Vladimir Visvader	1	(0,0,0,1,R)
16	(Italy) (6) Andrea Baroni	0	(0,0,F,N,N)
—	(Ukraine) (17) Yuriy Petrov	—	—

== Semi-finals ==
=== SF One - Ljubljana ===
- 19 June 2010
- SVN Ljubljana
- Stadion Ilirija (Length: 398 m)
- Referee and Jury President: (Czech Republic) Pavel Vana
- References
- Changes:

Draw 12. (Austria) Fritz Wallner (8th in QR1) → (Germany) Roberto Haupt (9th) → Kukovica (10th)

- Draw 4. (Russia) Simon Vlasov → Kovacic
- Draw 7. (Austria) Manuel Hauzinger → Reserve 17. Duh
- Draw 18. (Romania) Alexandru Toma → None

Pos.	Rider	Points	Details
1	(Slovenia) (2) Matej Žagar	14+3	(3,3,2,3,3)
2	(Poland) (16) Sebastian Ułamek	14+2	(3,3,3,3,2)
3	(Poland) (5) Szymon Kiełbasa	12+3	(2,2,3,2,3)
4	(Croatia) (6) Jurica Pavlic	12+2	(3,1,2,3,3)
5	(Poland) (1) Robert Miśkowiak	11	(2,3,1,2,3)
6	(Denmark) (10) Claus Vissing	10+3	(2,2,3,1,2)
7	(Slovenia) (9) Ales Kraljic	10+2	(3,1,3,2,1)
8	(Czech Republic) (15) Matěj Kůs	7	(2,3,1,1,0)
9	(Russia) (11) Aleksiej Charczenko	6	(1,2,0,2,1)
10	(Poland) (8) Rafał Trojanowski	6	(1,1,2,1,1)
11	(Croatia) (4) Dino Kovacic	5	(1,2,2,0,0)
12	(Slovenia) (7) Matija Duh	4	(0,1,0,3,0)
13	(Germany) (14) Tobias Busch	4	(1,X,0,1,2)
14	(Italy) (3) Guglielmo Franchetti	3	(0,0,1,0,2)
15	(Austria) (13) Lukas Simon	2	(0,0,1,0,1)
16	(Slovenia) (12) Samo Kukovica	0	(0,0,0,R,R)

=== SF Two - Balakovo ===
- 27 August 2010
- RUS Balakovo, Saratov Oblast
- Stadium “Trud” (Length: 380 m)
- Referee and Jury President: (Czech Republic)
- References
- Changes:

Draw 1. (Germany)
Draw 2. (Poland) Michał Szczepaniak
Draw 6. (Denmark) Simon Nielsen
Draw 8. (Hungary) Matej Ferjan
Draw 10. (Poland)
Draw 13. (Croatia) Dino Kovacic
Draw 17. (France) David Bellego
Draw 18. (Germany) Tobias Kroner

Pos.	Rider	Points	Details
1	(Russia) (10) Roman Povazhny	14+3	(3,3,2,3,3)
2	(Russia) (9) Denis Gizatullin	14+2	(2,3,3,3,3)
3	(Russia) (4) Renat Gafurov	13	(3,3,3,1,3)
4	(Russia) (6) Daniil Ivanov	10	(3,R,3,2,2)
5	(Russia) (13) Simon Vlasov	8	(2,2,0,1,3)
6	(Russia) (8) Denis Nosov	7+3	(0,1,2,3,1)
7	(Czech Republic) (11) Jan Jaros	7+2	(0,2,2,2,1)
8	(Russia) (1) Sergey Darkin	7+R	(2,0,R,3,2)
9	(Czech Republic) (15) Filip Šitera	6	(1,3,2,0,R)
10	(Ukraine) (12) Kiril Cukanov	6	(1,2,3,R,X)
11	(Latvia) (7) Jevgēņijs Karavackis	6	(1,1,1,2,1)
12	(Ukraine) (16) Volodymyr Dubinin	5	(3,0,1,1,0)
13	(Russia) (5) Lenar Nigmatzjanow	5	(2,1,R,0,2)
14	(Russia) (2) Andriej Kudrjaszow	4	(0,2,R,0,2)
15	(Poland) (3) Adrian Gomólski	4	(1,R,1,2,R)
16	(Italy) (14) Mattia Carpanese	2	(R,1,0,1,0)
—	(Netherlands) (18) Henk Bos	—	—

=== SF Three - Berghaupten ===
- 28 August 2010
- GER Berghaupten, Baden-Württemberg
- Sparkassen Speedodrome (Length: 262 m)
- Referee and Jury President: (Sweden) Krister Gardell
- References
- Changes:

Draw 4. (Hungary)
Draw 13. (Russia) Sergey Darkin
Draw 16. (Czech Republic) Luboš Tomíček, Jr.
Draw 17. (Russia) Daniil Ivanov

Pos.	Rider	Points	Details
1	(Ukraine) (9) Andriy Karpov	12+3	(1,2,3,3,3)
2	(Germany) (4) Tobias Kroner	12+2	(3,3,3,1,2)
3	(Czech Republic) (6) Aleš Dryml, Jr.	11	(3,2,3,2,1)
4	(Germany) (13) Martin Smolinski	10	(3,3,R,2,2)
5	(Latvia) (14) Ķasts Poudžuks	10	(1,3,1,2,3)
6	(Poland) (3) Sławomir Musielak	9+3	(0,2,2,2,3)
7	(Czech Republic) (16) Zdeněk Simota	9+2	(2,2,2,3,0)
8	(Finland) (2) Tero Aarnio	9+1	(1,1,3,3,1)
9	(Czech Republic) (11) Tomáš Suchánek	7	(2,3,1,1,0)
10	(Germany) (10) Thomas Stange	7	(3,R,2,1,1)
11	(Latvia) (1) Leonīds Paura	6	(2,1,X,0,3)
12	(Germany) (7) Max Dilger	6	(1,1,1,1,2)
13	(Slovenia) (12) Aleksander Čonda	5	(0,0,2,3,0)
14	(Ukraine) (5) Oleksandr Boroday	4	(2,0,1,0,1)
15	(Czech Republic) (15) Martin Málek	2	(0,0,0,0,2)
16	(Sweden) (8) Alexander Edberg	1	(0,1,0,0,0)
—	(Slovenia) (17) Matic Voldrih	—	—
—	(Ukraine) (18) Jaroslav Polyuhovich	—	—

== Final ==
- 4 September 2010
- POL Tarnów, Lesser Poland Voivodeship
- Stadion Miejski w Tarnowie (Length: 392 m)
- Referee: (Sweden) Krister Gardell
- Jury President: (Ukraine) Serhiy Lyatosinskyy
- References

Placing	Rider	Total	1	2	3	4	5	6	7	8	9	10	11	12	13	14	15	16	17	18	19	20	Pts	Pos	21
Gold medal	(Poland) (5) Sebastian Ułamek	15		3			3					3					3					3	15	Gold medal	
Silver medal	(Czech Republic) (13) Aleš Dryml, Jr.	12				2	2							3		3					2		12	Silver medal	
Bronze medal	(Ukraine) (3) Andriy Karpov	11	3						3				1				1				3		11	Bronze medal	3
4.	(Russia) (2) Renat Gafurov	11	2					2				2				2				3			11	4.	2
5.	(Russia) (16) Denis Gizatullin	10				3				3	2						2			M			10	5.	
6.	(Poland) (6) Robert Miśkowiak	9		1				3			3							1			1		9	6.	
7.	(Croatia) (8) Jurica Pavlic	9		2						2			3			1			1				9	7.	
8.	(Slovenia) (10) Matej Žagar	8			3			EF						2			EF		3				8	8.	
9.	(Russia) (15) Roman Povazhny	8				1			2			0						3	2				8	9.	
10.	(Czech Republic) (9) Filip Sitera	8			2		0						2					2		2			8	10.	
11.	(Czech Republic) (7) Jan Jaros	5		0					FX					1	3					1			5	11.	
12.	(Latvia) (12) Ķasts Poudžuks	4			1					1		1			1						EF		4	12.	
13.	(Czech Republic) (14) Zdenek Simota	3				0		1					0		0							2	3	13.	
14.	(Slovenia) (17) Ales Kraljic	2													2				0	0			2	14.	
15.	(Poland) (11) Sławomir Musielak	2			FX				1		1					0						0	2	15.	
16.	(Poland) (1) Szymon Kiełbasa	2	1				1				EF				M				-				2	16.	
17.	(Germany) (4) Tobias Kroner	1	0							0				0				EF				1	1	17.	
Placing	Rider	Total	1	2	3	4	5	6	7	8	9	10	11	12	13	14	15	16	17	18	19	20	Pts	Pos	21

m - exclusion for exceeding two minute time allowance • t - exclusion for touching the tapes • x - other exclusion • e - retired or mechanical failure • f - fell • ns - non-starter • nc - non-classify

gate A - inside	gate B	gate C	gate D - outside

== See also ==
- motorcycle speedway
- 2010 Individual Speedway Junior European Championship
