= 2010 Speedway Grand Prix Qualification =

Seasons
- ← 2009 2011 →

The 2010 Individual Speedway World Championship Grand Prix Qualification were a series of motorcycle speedway meetings used to determine the three riders who qualified for the 2010 Speedway Grand Prix. The top eight riders finishing the 2009 Grand Prix series automatically qualified for 2010. The final round of qualification – the Grand Prix Challenge – took place on 18 September 2009, in Coventry, England. The Grand Prix Challenge was won by Magnus Zetterström who finished ahead of Chris Holder and former Grand Prix rider Jarosław Hampel. All three riders qualified for the 2010 Grand Prix.

== Calendar ==
Race format
Gate	A (inside)	B	C	D (outside)
Heat No	Riders starting No
1	1	2	3	4
2	5	7	6	8
3	10	11	9	12
4	15	14	16	13
5	13	1	5	9
6	14	10	2	6
7	11	15	7	3
8	4	8	12	16
9	6	16	1	11
10	12	5	15	2
11	8	9	3	14
12	13	4	10	7
13	7	12	14	1
14	2	13	8	11
15	16	3	10	5
16	9	6	4	15
17	1	8	15	10
18	9	2	7	16
19	3	12	13	6
20	5	14	11	4

Date	Venue	Winner	
Qualifying Rounds (quarter-finals)
June 6	(Italy) Lonigo	(Poland) Sebastian Ułamek	result
June 7	(Czech Republic) Divišov	(Poland) Grzegorz Walasek	result
June 27	(Austria) St.Johann/Pg.	(Czech Republic) Aleš Dryml, Jr.	result
June 13	(Germany) Pocking	(Australia) Davey Watt	result
June 27	(Croatia) Goričan	(Croatia) Jurica Pavlic	result
Semi-Finals
July 4	(Sweden) Motala	(Denmark) Kenneth Bjerre	result
July 4	(Latvia) Daugavpils	(Croatia) Jurica Pavlic	result
Grand Prix Challenge
September 18	(United Kingdom) Coventry	(Sweden) Magnus Zetterström	result

== Domestic Qualifications ==
Deutscher Motor Sport Bund nominated five riders and two track reserve in February 2009. Avto-Moto Zveza Slovenije nominated three riders in March 2009.

=== Czech Republic ===
Autoklub of the Czech Republic nominated six riders in October 2008: Lukáš Dryml, Aleš Dryml, Jr., Luboš Tomíček, Jr., Adrian Rymel, Matěj Kůs and Filip Šitera. A last rider, who will be started in SGP Qualification will be nominated in 2009.

=== Poland ===
The top three riders from 2008 Golden Helmet Final qualified for Grand Prix Qualification (Damian Baliński, Jarosław Hampel and Adrian Miedziński). Four riders will be qualified after Domestic Final. Last rider and one reserve will be nominated by Main Commission of Speedway Sport. Two Polish 2009 Speedway Grand Prix permanent (Rune Holta and Grzegorz Walasek will be started in Domestic Final. Tomasz Gollob (#3) and Sebastian Ułamek (#14) will be not started.

- Finał krajowych eliminacji do GP IMŚ
  (Final of Domestic Qualification to Individual World Championship Grand Prix)
- 7 April 2009 (18:00)
- (Poland) Gdańsk
- Referee: Andrzej Terlecki
- Beat Time: 63.26 - Piotr Protasiewicz (heat 3)
- Qualify: 4 and 1 + 1R by Main Commission of Speedway Sport

Pos.	Rider	Points	Details
1	(9) Piotr Protasiewicz	14	(3,3,3,3,2)
2	(16) Grzegorz Walasek #13	13	(3,3,3,1,3)
3	(6) Janusz Kołodziej	12	(3,3,1,2,3)
4	(10) Krzysztof Kasprzak	11+3	(2,1,3,3,2)
5	(2) Piotr Świderski	11+2	(3,2,3,2,1)
6	(3) Rune Holta #8	10	(1,3,2,2,2)
7	(8) Tomasz Chrzanowski	6	(2,1,0,0,3)
8	(4) Krzysztof Buczkowski	6	(2,0,0,1,3)
9	(7) Tomasz Gapiński	6	(1,2,2,1,0)
10	(12) Rafał Okoniewski	6	(1,2,2,0,1)
11	(11) Daniel Jeleniewski	5	(0,0,2,3,0)
12	(13) Adrian Gomólski	5	(2,1,1,1,0)
13	(1) Adam Skórnicki	4	(0,0,0,3,1)
14	(5) Tomasz Jędrzejak	4	(0,2,e,0,2)
15	(14) Rafał Dobrucki	4	(0,e,1,2,1)
16	(15) Karol Ząbik	3	(1,1,1,0,0)
	(17) Grzegorz Zengota	-	-
	(18) Robert Miśkowiak	-	-

== Qualifying rounds ==
=== Lonigo ===
- Qualifying Round 1
- June 6, 2009 (21:00)
- (Italy) Lonigo, Santa Marina Stadium (Length: 334 m)
- Referee: (Germany) Frank Ziegler
- Jury President: (Sweden) Christer Bergstrøm

Pos.	Rider	Points	Details
1	(Poland) (7) Sebastian Ułamek #14	13	(1,3,3,3,3)
2	(Denmark) (14) Jesper B. Monberg	12+3	(1,3,3,2,3)
3	(Denmark) (6) Bjarne Pedersen	12+2	(2,1,3,3,3)
4	(Finland) (12) Kauko Nieminen	11	(3,2,3,1,2)
5	(Sweden) (10) Thomas H. Jonasson	10+3	(2,2,2,2,2)
6	(Australia) (4) Rory Schlein	10+2	(3,3,0,2,2)
7	(United Kingdom) (5) Tai Woffinden	10+1	(3,1,2,3,1)
8	(Australia) (13) Troy Batchelor	9	(2,2,1,3,1)
9	(Russia) (1) Denis Gizatullin	8	(F,3,2,0,3)
10	(Russia) (15) Roman Povazhny	6	(3,2,1,F,E)
11	(Slovenia) (3) Maks Gregorič	5	(2,1,2,F,0)
12	(United States) (16) Chris Kerr	4	(0,1,0,1,2)
13	(Italy) (2) Guglielmo Franchetti	4	(1,0,0,2,1)
14	(Italy) (11) Mattia Tadiello	3	(1,0,1,1,0)
15	(Italy) (8) Mattia Carpanese	2	(0,0,1,0,1)
16	(Italy) (17) Alessandro Novello	1	(1)
17	(United States) (9) Ryan Fisher	0	(X,0,0)
18	(Italy) (18) Andrea Baroni	0	(0)

=== Divišov ===
- Qualifying Round 2
- June 7, 2009 (15:00)
- (Czech Republic) Divišov, Stadion AK Divišov v AČR (Length: 350 m)
- Referee: (Denmark) Brian Svendsen
- Jury President: (United Kingdom) Anthony Noel

Pos.	Rider	Points	Details
1	(Poland) (16) Grzegorz Walasek #13	15	(3,3,3,3,3)
2	(Poland) (12) Piotr Protasiewicz	13+3	(3,1,3,3,3)
3	(Denmark) (8) Kenneth Bjerre #12	13+2	(3,2,3,3,2)
4	(Slovakia) (1) Martin Vaculík	12	(3,3,2,1,3)
5	(Russia) (14) Renat Gafurov	11	(2,2,2,2,3)
6	(Czech Republic) (5) Lukáš Dryml	10	(2,2,2,2,2)
7	(Finland) (15) Joonas Kylmäkorpi	8	(1,3,1,2,1)
8	(Czech Republic) (9) Hynek Štichauer	7	(0,1,1,3,2)
9	(Denmark) (11) Mads Korneliussen	7	(2,1,1,2,1)
10	(Russia) (10) Artem Laguta	6	(1,3,0,1,1)
11	(Czech Republic) (3) Josef Franc	6	(2,2,E,0,2)
12	(Ukraine) (4) Vladimir Dubinin	4	(0,0,3,1,0)
13	(Czech Republic) (17) Jan Jaros	3	(2,1)
14	(Czech Republic) (2) Richard Wolff	3	(1,E,0,1,1)
15	(Latvia) (7) Vjačeslavs Giruckis	2	(1,0,1,0,0)
16	(Slovenia) (6) Denis Štojs	1	(0,1,0,0,R)
17	(Czech Republic) (13) Luboš Tomíček	0	(E,F)
18	(Czech Republic) (18) Michael Hádek	0	(F)

=== St.Johann/Pg. ===
- Qualifying Round 3
- June 27, 2009 (19:15)
- (Austria) Sankt Johann im Pongau, Speedwaybahn (Length: 380 m)
- Referee: (Denmark) Jesper Steentoft
- Jury President: (Poland) Andrej Grodzki
- Allocation:
  - (Germany) Christian Hefenbrock
  - (Germany) Tobias Kroner

Pos.	Rider	Points	Details
1	(Czech Republic) (9) Aleš Dryml	14	(3,3,2,3,3)
2	(Germany) (2) Christian Hefenbrock	13+3	(3,2,3,3,2)
3	(Denmark) (16) Patrick Hougaard	13+2	(3,3,3,3,1)
4	(Poland) (8) Adrian Miedziński	12	(3,2,3,2,2)
5	(Denmark) (13) Morten Risager	10	(1,2,3,1,3)
6	(Denmark) (5) Leon Madsen	10	(2,1,2,2,3)
7	(Germany) (14) Tobias Kroner	9	(2,3,1,2,1)
8	(United Kingdom) (3) James Wright	8	(2,3,0,1,2)
9	(Austria) (10) Manuel Hauzinger	7	(1,1,2,0,3)
10	(Slovenia) (4) Izak Šantej	7	(1,1,1,2,2)
11	(United Kingdom) (12) Daniel King	6	(2,0,1,3,0)
12	(Austria) (6) Fritz Wallner	5	(1,E,2,1,1)
13	(Austria) (15) Manuel Novotny	2	(0,2,F,0,F)
14	(Netherlands) (1) Henk Bos	2	(0,0,0,1,1)
15	(France) (11) Theo Pijper	2	(0,1,1,0,0)
16	(Netherlands) (7) Henry van der Steen	0	(0,0,0,0,0)
–	(Austria) (17) Hans Peter Kulterer	–	–
–	(Austria) (18) Dany Gappmaier	–	–

=== Pocking ===
- Qualifying Round 4
- 12 April, 2009 (14:00 CEST)
- GER Pocking, Rottalstadion Pocking (Length: 396.2 m)
- Referee: (Russia) Andrey Savin
- Jury President: (France) Christian Bouin
- Qualify: 6
- Changes:
  - (2) Theo Pijper → Tresarrieu
  - (18) Thomas Stange → Busch

Pos.	Rider	Points	Details
1	(Australia) (10) Davey Watt	13+3	(3,3,3,3,1)
2	(Poland) (1) Jarosław Hampel	13+2	(3,3,1,3,3)
3	(Sweden) (15) Antonio Lindbäck	12+3	(1,3,3,3,2)
4	(Sweden) (3) Fredrik Lindgren #10	12+2	(2,2,3,2,3)
5	(United Kingdom) (11) Chris Harris #11	11	(1,1,3,3,3)
6	(Germany) (4) Martin Smolinski	10+3	(1,3,2,2,2)
7	(Poland) (12) Damian Baliński	10+F	(2,2,2,2,2)
8	(Czech Republic) (16) Matěj Kůs	8	(3,1,0,1,3)
9	(Denmark) (6) Niels Kristian Iversen	7	(3,1,2,F,1)
10	(Latvia) (9) Kasts Podžuks	5	(0,2,0,1,2)
11	(United Kingdom) (14) Edward Kennett	5	(2,2,1,0,d)
12	(Germany) (8) Richard Speiser	4	(1,0,2,1,0)
13	(Czech Republic) (7) Filip Šitera	4	(2,0,1,1,F)
14	(France) (2) Mathieu Tresarrieu	3	(0,0,1,2,E)
15	(Germany) (13) Max Dilger	1	(0,1,0,0,0)
16	(Italy) (5) Marco Gregnanin	1	(0,E,0,0,1)
–	(Germany) (17) Frank Facher	–	–
–	(Germany) (18) Tobias Busch	–	–

=== Goričan ===
- Qualifying Round 5
- June 27, 2009 (19:30)
- (Croatia) Goričan, Stadium Millenium (Length: 305 m)
- Referee: (Hungary) Istvan Darago
- Jury President: (France) Christian Bouin
- Qualify: 6 + 1R

Pos.	Rider	Points	Details
1	(Croatia) (11) Jurica Pavlic	15	(3,3,3,3,3)
2	(Poland) (10) Piotr Świderski	12	(1,2,3,3,3)
3	(Australia) (3) Chris Holder	11+3	(2,2,3,2,2)
4	(Slovenia) (12) Matej Zagar	11+2	(2,X,3,3,3)
5	(Sweden) (14) Jonas Davidsson	11+1	(3,3,2,1,2)
6	(Hungary) (8) Matej Ferjan	11+DNS	(3,3,1,2,2)
7	(Ukraine) (9) Andriy Karpov	9	(0,3,0,3,3)
8	(Poland) (7) Krzysztof Kasprzak	8	(1,1,2,2,2)
9	(Poland) (2) Janusz Kołodziej	7	(3,T,2,1,1)
10	(Russia) (6) Simon Vlasov	6	(2,1,1,1,1)
11	(United Kingdom) (15) Lewis Bridger	5	(2,0,1,2,0)
12	(Czech Republic) (16) Adrian Rymel	5	(1,1,2,1,0)
13	(Sweden) (1) David Ruud	4	(1,2,X,0,1)
14	(Croatia) (4) Marko Vlah	3	(0,2,0,0,1)
15	(Croatia) (17) Renato Cvetko	1	(0,1,0,0,0)
16	(Hungary) (13) Norbert Magosi	1	(0,E,1,0,F)
17	(Croatia) (18) Nikola Pigac	0	(0)
–	(United Kingdom) (5) Lee Richardson	–	–

== Semi-finals ==
=== Motala ===
- Semi-Final 1
- 4 July 2009 (16:00 UTV+2)
- (Sweden) Motala, Lastpartner Arena (Length: 291 m)
- Referee: (Czech Republic) Pavel Vana
- Jury President: (United Kingdom) Anthony Noel
- Qualify: 8 + 1 reserve
- Changes:

No. 9 (Poland) Sebastian Ułamek (injured) replaced by track reserve Tai Woffinden

Pos.	Rider	Points	Details
1	(Denmark) (4) Kenneth Bjerre #12	14	(3,2,3,3,3)
2	(Poland) (16) Grzegorz Walasek #13	13	(3,3,1,3,3)
3	(Sweden) (14) Jonas Davidsson	10+3	(1,3,3,3,0)
4	(Finland) (11) Kauko Nieminen	10+2	(1,3,3,1,2)
5	(United Kingdom) (15) Chris Harris #9	9	(2,2,1,2,2)
6	(Czech Republic) (2) Lukáš Dryml	9	(1,0,3,3,2)
7	(Sweden) (5) Magnus Zetterström	8	(3,1,2,1,1)
8	(Australia) (12) Davey Watt	8	(3,0,0,2,3)
9	(Sweden) (3) Antonio Lindbäck	7	(2,1,0,2,2)
10	(Russia) (13) Renat Gafurov	6	(0,3,1,2,0)
11	(Denmark) (10) Morten Risager	6	(2,1,0,0,3)
12	(United Kingdom) (9) Tai Woffinden	5	(0,2,2,1,Fx)
13	(Slovenia) (8) Matej Žagar	5	(2,1,1,Fx,1)
14	(Poland) (6) Piotr Świderski	4	(1,2,0,0,1)
15	(Denmark) (1) Jesper B. Monberg	3	(0,0,2,1,0)
16	(Germany) (7) Christian Hefenbrock	3	(0,0,2,0,1)
-	(Finland) (17) Joonas Kylmäkorpi	-	-
-	(Czech Republic) (18) Matěj Kůs	-	-

=== Daugavpils ===
- Semi-Final 2
- 4 July 2009 (15:00 UTC +3)
- (Latvia) Daugavpils, Latvijas Spidveja Centrs (Length: 373 metres)
- Referee: (United Kingdom) Mick Bates
- Jury President: (Slovenia) Boris Kotnjek
- Times:
  - Heat 3: 67.6 - Bogdanovs (new track record)
  - Heat 6: 66.9 - Pavlic (new track record)
- Changes:

No. 4 (Sweden) Thomas H. Jonasson replaced by track reserve Andriy Karpov
No. 1 (Denmark) Leon Madsen replaced by track reserve Tobias Kroner
No. 2 (Denmark) Patrick Hougaard replaced by James Wright

Pos.	Rider	Points	Details
1	(Croatia) (14) Jurica Pavlic	12+3	(1,3,3,3,2)
2	(Poland) (11) Jarosław Hampel	12+2	(0,3,3,3,3)
3	(Sweden) (12) Fredrik Lindgren #10	11+3	(2,2,3,2,2)
4	(Latvia) (10) Maksims Bogdanovs	11+2	(3,2,1,2,3)
5	(Australia) (15) Chris Holder	10	(3,1,2,3,1)
6	(Poland) (9) Adrian Miedziński	10	(1,2,2,2,3)
7	(Poland) (5) Piotr Protasiewicz	9	(2,3,1,3,E)
8	(Germany) (13) Martin Smolinski	8	(2,1,3,2,0)
9	(Germany) (1) Tobias Kroner	7	(3,0,1,1,2)
10	(Czech Republic) (3) Aleš Dryml, Jr.	6	(2,0,0,1,3)
11	(Denmark) (8) Bjarne Pedersen	6	(3,1,1,1,0)
12	(Australia) (7) Rory Schlein	5	(0,2,2,0,1)
13	(Slovakia) (6) Martin Vaculík	5	(1,0,2,1,1)
14	(Ukraine) (4) Andriy Karpov	4	(0,3,0,0,1)
15	(United Kingdom) (2) James Wright	4	(1,1,0,0,2)
16	(Hungary) (16) Matej Ferjan	0	(0,X,-,-,-)
17	(Latvia) (17) Ķasts Poudžuks	0	(X,0)
18	(Latvia) (18) Vjačeslavs Giruckis	0	(0)

== Grand Prix Challenge ==
- Grand Prix Challenge
- 18 September 2009 (20:00 UTC+1)
- (United Kingdom) Coventry
- Referee: (Germany) Christian Froschauer
- Jury President: (Finland) Ilkka Teromaa
- Qualify to the 2010 Speedway Grand Prix: top three
- Changes:

(18) (Germany) Tobias Kroner → A.Dryml, Jr. → Risager
(17) (Sweden) Antonio Lindbäck → A.Dryml, Jr.

Placing	Rider	Total	1	2	3	4	5	6	7	8	9	10	11	12	13	14	15	16	17	18	19	20	Pts	Pos	21
1	(Sweden) (10) Magnus Zetterström	14			3			2						3			3		3				14	1	3
2	(Australia) (1) Chris Holder	14	3				3				3				3				2				14	2	2
3	(Poland) (2) Jarosław Hampel	13	2					3				3				2				3			13	Q3	
4	(Sweden) (13) Fredrik Lindgren #10	12				3	2							1		3					3		12	4	
5	(United Kingdom) (4) Chris Harris #9	10	0							2				2				3				3	10	5	
6	(Poland) (7) Piotr Protasiewicz	10		3					3					Fx	2					2			10	6	
7	(Australia) (14) Davey Watt	6				1		1					3		1							0	6	7	
8	(Germany) (12) Martin Smolinski	6			1					1		2			0						2		6	8	
9	(Denmark) (9) Kenneth Bjerre #12	6			0		1						2					2		1			6	9	
10	(Poland) (15) Adrian Miedziński	6				2			2			1						1	R				6	10	
11	(Poland) (8) Grzegorz Walasek #13	4		0						3			1			-			-				4	11	
12	(Czech Republic) (5) Lukáš Dryml	4		2			0					0					X					2	4	12	
13	(Sweden) (6) Jonas Davidsson	3		1				0			2							0			0		3	13	
14	(Croatia) (11) Jurica Pavlic	3			2				0		0					0						1	3	14	
15	(Latvia) (16) Maksims Bogdanovs	3				0				Fx	1						2			0			3	15	
16	(Finland) (3) Kauko Nieminen	3	1						1				0				X				1		3	16	
17	(Czech Republic) (17) Aleš Dryml, Jr.	1														1							1	17	
18	(Denmark) (18) Morten Risager	1																	1				1	18	
Placing	Rider	Total	1	2	3	4	5	6	7	8	9	10	11	12	13	14	15	16	17	18	19	20	Pts	Pos	21

m - exclusion for exceeding two minute time allowance • t - exclusion for touching the tapes • x - other exclusion • e - retired or mechanical failure • f - fell • ns - non-starter • nc - non-classify

gate A - inside	gate B	gate C	gate D - outside

== See also ==
- Speedway Grand Prix
