= 2009 Individual Speedway European Championship =

Motorcycle racing competition

Seasons
- ← 2008 2010 →

The 2009 Individual European Championship will be the 9th UEM Individual Speedway European Championship season. The final took place on 23 August, 2009 in Tolyatti, Russia. The championship was won by Renat Gafurov (Russia), who beat Andriej Karpov (Ukraine) and Aleš Dryml, Jr. (Czech Republic) in Run-Off. The defending champion, Matej Žagar, lost in semi-final 3.

== Calendar ==
Day	Venue	Winner	
Qualifying Rounds
1 May	(Austria) Mureck	(Hungary) József Tabaka	result
9 May	(Germany) Stralsund	(Russia) Renat Gafurov	result
17 May	(Ukraine) Lviv	(Russia) Daniil Ivanov	result
Semi-Finals
16 May	(Austria) Natschbach-Loipersbach	(Russia) Denis Gizatullin	result
5 July	(Germany) Diedenbergen	(Russia) Renat Gafurov	result
25 July	(Croatia) Goričan	(Croatia) Jurica Pavlic	result
Final
23 August	(Russia) Tolyatti	(Russia) Renat Gafurov	result

== Qualifying rounds ==
=== Mureck ===
Qualifying Round 1

- 1 May 2009 (15:00)
- (Austria) Mureck, Stadium Mureck (Length: 389 m)
- Referee: (Hungary) Darago Istvan
- Jury President: None
- Qualify: 8 + 2R to SF1

Pos.	Rider	Points	Details
1	(Hungary) (1) József Tabaka	13	(3,3,1,3,3)
2	(Czech Republic) (3) Richard Wolff	12	(2,2,3,2,3)
3	(Slovenia) (15) Aleksander Čonda	11+3	(1,3,2,3,2)
4	(Hungary) (5) Sándor Tihanyi	11+2	(3,2,2,1,3)
5	(Russia) (11) Denis Gizatullin	10	(E,3,3,3,1)
6	(France) (12) Theo Pijper	9	(3,0,3,2,1)
7	(Italy) (2) Alessandro Milanese	9	(0,3,1,2,3)
8	(France) (13) Mathieu Tresarrieu	9	(3,1,2,1,2)
9	(Austria) (4) Fritz Wallner	8	(1,2,3,2,F)
10	(Romania) (8) Alexandru Toma	7	(2,1,2,E,2)
11	(Austria) (9) Lukas Simon	6	(1,0,1,3,1)
12	(Croatia) (14) Ivan Vargek	5	(T/-,2,0,1,2)
13	(Slovenia) (16) Matija Duh	5	(2,1,0,1,1)
14	(Romania) (10) Georghe Adrian-Sorin	2	(2,E,E,0,0)
15	(Italy) (7) Alessandro Novello	2	(1,0,1,0,0)
16	(Bulgaria) (6) Milen Manev	1	(0,1,0,0,0)
17	(Austria) (17) Christian Pelikan	0	(0)
18	(Austria) (18) Daniel Gappmaier	-	-

=== Lviv ===
Qualifying Round 3

- 17 May 2009
- (Ukraine) Lviv, Stadium "SKA" (Length: 382 m)
- Referee: (Poland) Wojciech Grodzki
- Jury President: None
- Qualify: 8 + 2R to SF3
- Change:
  - (1) (Germany) → (Russia)
  - (4) (Ukraine) → (Russia)
  - (11) (Germany) → (Czech Republic)
  - (16) Adrian Gomólski started in QR 2 → Rempała

Pos.	Rider	Points	Details
1	(Russia) (7) Daniil Ivanov	14	(3,3,2,3,3)
2	(Ukraine) (13) Andriy Karpov	13	(3,2,2,3,3)
3	(Latvia) (15) Andrejs Koroļevs	12	(2,3,1,3,3)
4	(Poland) (16) Marcin Rempała	10	(0,3,2,3,2)
5	(Poland) (10) Zbigniew Suchecki	10	(3,2,3,Fx,2)
6	(Latvia) (2) Ķasts Puodžuks	10	(3,1,3,2,1)
7	(Russia) (4) Vladimir Dubinin	9	(2,2,0,2,3)
8	(Russia) (6) Roman Ivanov	8+3	(1,3,1,1,2)
9	(Slovenia) (14) Maks Gregorič	8+2	(1,E,3,2,2)
10	(Russia) (1) Ilia Bondarenko	7+3	(1,2,3,1,0)
11	(Czech Republic) (8) Jan Jaros	7+2	(2,1,2,1,1)
12	(Italy) (5) Guglielmo Franchetti	5	(0,1,1,2,1)
13	(Czech Republic) (9) Luboš Tomíček, Jr.	3	(2,T/-,1,E,0)
14	(Czech Republic) (11) Martin Malek	2	(1,1,0,0,E)
15	(Slovenia) (3) Ales Kraljic	2	(X,0,F,1,1)
16	(Slovakia) (12) Jan Halabrin	0	(0,0,-,0,0)
17	(Ukraine) (17) Kiril Cukanov	0	(0) - Heat 5
18	(Ukraine) (18) Volodymyr Teygel	0	(0)

=== Stralsund ===
Qualifying Round 2

- 9 May 2009
- (Germany) Stralsund, Paul–Griefzu–Stadion (Length: 385 m)
- Referee: (United Kingdom) Mick Bates
- Jury President:
- Qualify: 8 + 2R to SF2
- Change: (14) (Belgium) Eddie Turksem injury → Gomólski

Pos.	Rider	Points	Details
1	(Russia) (16) Renat Gafurov	14	(2,3,3,3,3)
2	(Poland) (14) Adrian Gomólski	13	(3,2,3,2,3)
3	(Russia) (9) Roman Povazhny	12	(2,3,2,3,2)
4	(Denmark) (1) Claus Vissing	10	(3,0,1,3,3)
5	(Czech Republic) (13) Hynek Stichauer	10	(1,1,3,2,3)
6	(Germany) (11) Roberto Haupt	9	(1,2,3,3,1)
7	(Poland) (6) Kamil Brzozowski	9	(2,3,0,2,2)
8	(Czech Republic) (5) Filip Šitera	9	(1,2,2,2,2)
9	(Netherlands) (2) Jannick de Jong	8	(2,1,3,1,1)
10	(Germany) (12) Tobias Busch	7+3	(3,1,1,1,1)
11	(Poland) (8) Daniel Pytel	7+M	(3,2,0,0,2)
12	(Denmark) (3) Klaus Jakobsen	5	(0,3,1,1,0)
13	(Finland) (4) Joni Koskinen	3	(1,0,2,0,0)
14	(Slovenia) (15) Matic Voldrih	3	(0,1,0,1,1)
15	(Ukraine) (7) Oleksandr Boroday	0	(0,0,E,-,-)
16	(Finland) (10) Jari Makinen	0	(0,0,E,-,-)
17	(Germany) (17) Erik Pudel	0	(0,0)
18	(Germany) (18) Mathias Bartz	0	(0,0)

== Semi-finals ==
=== Natschbach-Loipersbach ===
Semi-Final 1

- 16 May 2009 (17:15)
- (Austria) Natschbach-Loipersbach, Stadium Natschbach Loipersbach (Length: 366 m)
- Referee: (Germany) Christian Froschauer
- Jury President: None
- Change:
  - (13) injury Tomasz Gapiński → Jamroży
  - (12) (Slovenia) Aleksander Čonda → Reserve 17
  - (17) Reserve → Simon (11th in QR1)
  - (18) (Romania) Alexandru Toma → None

Pos.	Rider	Points	Details
1	(Russia) (15) Denis Gizatullin	15	(3,3,3,3,3)
2	(Poland) (9) Rafał Trojanowski	12	(2,3,2,2,3)
3	(Hungary) (7) József Tabaka	10+3	(3,1,1,3,2)
4	(Czech Republic) (2) Josef Franc	10+2	(2,3,2,3,e)
5	(Poland) (13) Ronnie Jamroży	9+3	(1,1,3,2,2)
6	(Czech Republic) (1) Aleš Dryml, Jr.	9+2	(3,2,2,0,2)
7	(Austria) (10) Manuel Hauzinger	8	(3,0,2,3,X)
8	(Germany) (3) Max Dilger	7	(1,0,3,0,3)
9	(Germany) (4) Frank Facher	7	(0,3,F,1,3)
10	(Czech Republic) (6) Richard Wolff	7	(2,2,3,0,0)
11	(Austria) (12) Fritz Wallner	6	(1,2,1,1,1)
12	(France) (11) Theo Pijper	4	(0,2,0,0,2)
13	(Italy) (8) Alessandro Milanese	4	(1,0,1,1,1)
14	(Austria) (16) Manuel Novotny	4	(F,1,1,1,1)
15	(Hungary) (5) Sándor Tihanyi	3	(0,0,0,2,1)
16	(France) (14) Mathieu Tresarrieu	3	(X,1,e,2,0)
17	(Austria) (17) Lukas Simon	2	(2)

=== Goričan ===
Semi-Final 3

- 25 July 2009 (20:00 UTC+2)
- (Croatia) Goričan, Stadium Milenium, Donji Kraljevec (Length: 305 m)
- Referee: (Poland) Wojciech Grodzki
- Jury President: None
- Change:

No.2: (Latvia) Ķasts Puodžuks → Jan Jaros
No.4: (Poland) Marcin Rempała → track reserve Maks Gregorič
No.5: (Poland) Zbigniew Suchecki → Martin Malek
No.6: (Poland) Karol Ząbik (started in Individual Polish Championship Final) → Tomasz Rempała
No.10: (Latvia) Andrejs Koroļevs → (Italy) Guglielmo Franchetti → Ales Kraljic
No.14: (Russia) Roman Ivanov → Luboš Tomíček, Jr.
No.15: (Poland) Robert Miśkowiak → None
Reserve: (Russia) Ilia Bondarenko → None

Pos.	Rider	Points	Details
1	(Croatia) (12) Jurica Pavlic	15	(3,3,3,3,3)
2	(Russia) (9) Daniil Ivanov	14	(2,3,3,3,3)
3	(Ukraine) (8) Andriy Karpov	12	(3,1,2,3,3)
4	(Czech Republic) (3) Matěj Kůs	10	(3,2,1,2,2)
5	(Slovenia) (4) Maks Gregorič	10	(2,2,1,2,3)
6	(Czech Republic) (5) Martin Malek	9	(2,0,2,3,2)
7	(Russia) (1) Vladimir Dubinin	8	(0,2,2,2,2)
8	(Italy) (13) Mattia Carpanese	8	(2,1,2,2,1)
9	(Czech Republic) (14) Luboš Tomíček, Jr.	7	(3,3,0,1,E)
10	(Czech Republic) (2) Jan Jaros	7	(1,2,1,1,2)
11	(Slovenia) (7) Matej Žagar	6	(E,3,3,E,E)
12	(Poland) (6) Tomasz Rempała	5	(1,Fx,3,1,E)
13	(Croatia) (16) Marko Vlah	3	(1,0,1,0,1)
14	(Slovenia) (11) Izak Šantej	3	(1,1,0,0,1)
15	(Slovenia) (10) Ales Kraljic	3	(F,M,0,1,1)

=== Diedenbergen ===
Semi-Final 2

- 5 July 2009 (14:00 UTC+2)
- (Germany) Diedenbergen, Rhein Main Stadion (Length: 400m)
- Referee: (Denmark) B. Svendsen
- Jury President: None
- Changes:

No 2. (Russia) Roman Povazhny (match in Polish league) → Jannick de Jong
No 15. (Poland) Kamil Brzozowski (injury) → Pytel

Pos.	Rider	Points	Details
1	(Russia) (9) Renat Gafurov	15	(3,3,3,3,3)
2	(Poland) (1) Adrian Gomólski	11+3	(3,2,X,3,3)
3	(Denmark) (14) Mads Korneliussen	11+2	(3,2,2,2,2)
4	(Latvia) (11) Jevgēņijs Karavackis	11+1	(1,1,3,3,3)
5	(Russia) (10) Simon Vlasov	11+0	(2,3,2,3,1)
6	(Russia) (8) Sergey Darkin	10	(2,3,1,2,2)
7	(Poland) (15) Daniel Pytel	9	(2,3,3,1,0)
8	(Denmark) (4) Patrick Hougaard	9	(2,2,3,2,0)
9	(Germany) ^{a} (12) Marcin Sekula	6	(0,1,2,0,3)
10	(Czech Republic) (7) Hynek Stichauer	6	(3,e,1,1,1)
11	(Czech Republic) (6) Filip Šitera	5	(1,0,2,0,2)
12	(Germany) (3) Roberto Haupt	4	(1,2,0,0,1)
13	(Denmark) (16) Claus Vissing	4	(1,X,X,1,2)
14	(Germany) (5) Thomas Stange	4	(e,1,e,2,1)
15	(Netherlands) (2) Jannick de Jong	3	(0,1,1,1,0)
16	(Hungary) (13) Roland Kovacs	0	(0,0,0,e,0)

Notes:

a. Marcin Sekula is a Pole who rode with German licence and was nominated by German Federation (DMSD)

== Final ==
The Final

- 23 August 2009 (16:00 UTC+5)
- (Russia) Tolyatti, Stadium “STROITEL” (Length: 353 m)
- Referee: (United Kingdom) Anthony Steele
- Jury President: (Poland) Andrzej Grodzki
- Change:

(10) (Poland) Adrian Gomólski (injury) → track reserve Darkin
(5) (Poland) Rafał Trojanowski → track reserve A.Dryml, Jr.
(17) (Czech Republic) A.Dryml, Jr. → (Austria) Manuel Hauzinger → None
(18) (Russia) Darkin → (Denmark) Patrick Hougaard → None
{7} (Croatia) Jurica Pavlic → Dubinin

Placing	Rider	Total	1	2	3	4	5	6	7	8	9	10	11	12	13	14	15	16	17	18	19	20	Pts	Pos	21
1	(Russia) (6) Renat Gafurov	13		1				3			3							3			3		13	8	3
2	(Ukraine) (8) Andriy Karpov	13		3						3			3			2			2				13	1	2
3	(Czech Republic) (5) Aleš Dryml, Jr.	13		2			3					2					3					3	13	8	1
4	(Poland) (13) Ronnie Jamroży	12				3	2							3		3					1		12	4	
5	(Czech Republic) (12) Josef Franc	11			2					2		3			2						2		11	5	
6	(Russia) (1) Denis Gizatullin	9	3				1				1				1				3				9	6	
7	(Czech Republic) (9) Matěj Kůs	8			1		0						2					2		3			8	7	
8	(Russia) (14) Simon Vlasov	8				2		1					0		3							2	8	8	
9	(Russia) (3) Daniil Ivanov	6	0						3				1				2				X		6	9	
10	(Russia) (10) Sergey Darkin	6			3			2						X			R		1				6	10	
11	(Latvia) (2) Jevgēņijs Karavackis	4	2					0				0				0				2			4	11	
12	(Slovenia) (16) Maks Gregorič	4				0				1	2						1			X			4	12	
13	(Denmark) (11) Mads Korneliussen	4			R				2		0					1						1	4	13	
14	(Hungary) (4) József Tabaka	4	1							X				2				1				0	4	14	
15	(Russia) (7) Vladimir Dubinin	3		0					1					1	0					1			3	15	
16	(Czech Republic) (15) Martin Malek	2				1			0			1						0	0				2	16	
Placing	Rider	Total	1	2	3	4	5	6	7	8	9	10	11	12	13	14	15	16	17	18	19	20	Pts	Pos	21

m - exclusion for exceeding two minute time allowance • t - exclusion for touching the tapes • x - other exclusion • e - retired or mechanical failure • f - fell • ns - non-starter • nc - non-classify

gate A - inside	gate B	gate C	gate D - outside

== See also ==
- motorcycle speedway
