= Andrei Karpov =

Andrei Karpov may refer to:

- Andrei Karpov (a fictional character in General Hospital), List of General Hospital characters#K
- Andriy Karpov (born 1987), Ukrainian motorcycle speedway rider
