= 2012 Speedway European Championship =

Motorcycle racing competition

Season details
- Dates: 18 August – 30 September
- Events: 4
- Cities: 4
- Countries: 3
- Riders: 15 permanents 1 wild card(s); 2 track reserves
- Heats: 20 (in 4 events)

Winners
- Champion: CZE Aleš Dryml, Jr.
- Runner-up: POL Robert Miskowiak
- 3rd place: UKR Andriy Karpov

The 2012 Individual Speedway European Championship was won by Aleš Dryml, Jr. from Czech Republic.

== Classification ==
Pos.	Rider	Points	(Poland)	(Latvia)	(Slovenia)	(Austria)
1	(Czech Republic) Aleš Dryml, Jr.	48	15	13	12	8
2	(Poland) Robert Miśkowiak	44	10	9	11	14
3	(Ukraine) Andriy Karpov	43	9	10	15	9
4	(Latvia) Kjasts Puodžuks	41	9	9	11	12
5	(Latvia) Andžejs Ļebedevs	40	10	10	14	6
5	(Poland) Tomasz Gapiński	40	13	6	10	11
7	(Denmark) Kenni Larsen	34	9	5	6	14
8	(Germany) Tobias Busch	27	4	8	7	8
9	(Poland) Mateusz Szczepaniak	26	4	9	6	7
10	(Czech Republic) Martin Málek	23	7	3	6	7
10	(Czech Republic) Tomáš Suchánek	19	7	3	4	5
12	(Russia) Grigory Laguta	13	–	13	–	–
13	(Germany) Max Dilger	12	4	5	3	–
14	(Slovenia) Matic Voldrih	11	–	–	4	7
15	(Poland) Szymon Kiełbasa	9	9	–	–	–
15	(Latvia) Vjačeslavs Gieruckis	9	–	9	–	–
17	(Poland) Grzegorz Zengota	8	–	8	–	–
18	(Russia) Viktor Golubovski	7	7	–	–	–
19	(Slovenia) Aleksander Čonda	4	–	–	4	–
20	(Austria) Fritz Wallner	3	–	–	–	3
21	(Austria) Dany Gappmaier	2	–	–	–	2
21	(Hungary) József Tabaka	2	2	–	–	–
21	(Austria) Lukas Simon	2	–	–	–	2
21	(Slovenia) Maks Gregorič	2	0	0	–	2
21	(Hungary) Norbert Magosi	2	–	–	2	–
26	(Poland) Wojciech Lisiecki (res)	1	1	–	–	–
27	(Austria) Johannes Fiala	0	–	–	–	0

2012 Speedway European Champion
(Czech Republic)
Aleš Dryml, Jr.
First title
