= 2011 Individual Speedway European Championship =

Motorcycle racing competition

2011 Speedway European Championship

Season details
- Dates: September 24
- Events: Final, 3 semifinals, 3 qualifications
- permanents
- Heats: 147 (in 7 events)

Winners
- Champion: RUS Grigory Laguta
- Runner-up: POL Tomasz Gapiński
- 3rd place: CZE Aleš Dryml, Jr.

The 2011 Individual European Championship was the 11th UEM Individual Speedway European Championship season. The final took place on 24 September 2011 in at the Rivenenskyy Mototrek in Rivne, Ukraine. The defending champion was Sebastian Ułamek from Poland.

== Final ==
- 24 September 2011
- UKR Rivenenskyy Mototrek, Rivne
- (Length: 360 m)
- References

Placing	Rider	Total	1	2	3	4	5	6	7	8	9	10	11	12	13	14	15	16	17	18	19	20	Pts	Pos	21
Gold medal	(Russia) (14) Grigory Laguta	14				3		3					2		3							3	14	Gold medal	3
Silver medal	(Poland) (10) Tomasz Gapiński	14			3			2						3			3		3				14	Silver medal	2
Bronze medal	(Czech Republic) (13) Aleš Dryml, Jr.	12				1	3							2		3					3		12	Bronze medal	
4.	(Ukraine) (7) Oleksandr Loktaev	11		3					2					1	2					3			11	4.	
5.	(Ukraine) (6) Andriy Karpov	10		1				1			3							3			2		10	5.	
6.	(Russia) (5) Denis Gizatullin	10		2			2					2					2					2	10	6.	
7.	(Poland) (3) Robert Miskowiak	9	3						3				3				x				e		9	7.	
8.	(Hungary) (1) Jozsef Tabaka	7	2				0				2				1				2				7	8.	
9.	(Denmark) (9) Nicolai Klindt	7			2		1						1					2		1			7	9.	
10.	(Russia) (15) Renat Gafurov	6				2			1			3						e	ns				6	10.	
11.	(Germany) (12) Max Dilger	6			1					3		1			0						1		6	11.	
12.	(Sweden) (4) Ricky Kling	5	1							2				0				1				1	5	12.	
13.	(Hungary) (8) Norbert Magosi	3		0						e			0			2			1				3	13.	
14.	(Ukraine) (2) Kiril Cukanov	2	t					0				0				0				2			2	14.	
15.	(Poland) (16) Michal Mitko	2				0				1	1						f/ns			ns			2	15.	
16.	(Slovenia) (11) Aleksander Conda	1			e				0		0					1						0	1	16.	
Placing	Rider	Total	1	2	3	4	5	6	7	8	9	10	11	12	13	14	15	16	17	18	19	20	Pts	Pos	21

m - exclusion for exceeding two minute time allowance • t - exclusion for touching the tapes • x - other exclusion • e - retired or mechanical failure • f - fell • ns - non-starter • nc - non-classify

gate A - inside	gate B	gate C	gate D - outside

== See also ==
- Motorcycle Speedway
- 2011 Individual Speedway Junior European Championship
