= 2005 Individual Speedway European Championship =

Motorcycle racing competition

Seasons
- ← 2004 2006 →

The 2005 Individual Speedway European Championship

== Qualification ==
- Qualifying Round 1:
  - May 1, 2005
  - (Hungary) Debrecen
- Qualifying Round 2:
  - May 7, 2005
  - (Italy) Terenzano
- Qualifying Round 3:
  - May 13, 2005
  - (Ukraine) Lviv
- Semi-Final A:
  - July 2, 2005
  - (Germany) Stralsund
- Semi-Final B:
  - July 2, 2005
  - (Hungary) Miskolc
- Scandinavian Final (Semi-Final C):
  - July 31, 2005
  - (Finland) Seinäjoki

== Final ==
- October 9, 2005
- (Italy) Lonigo
- Renat Gafurov replaced the injured Sergey Darkin.

| Pos. | Rider | Country | Pts. | Heats |
|---|---|---|---|---|
| 1 | Jesper B. Jensen | Denmark | 14 | (3,3,3,2,3) +3 |
| 2 | Aleš Dryml, Jr. | Czech Republic | 14 | (3,3,2,3,3) +2 |
| 3 | Kai Laukkanen | Finland | 12 | (1,3,3,3,2) |
| 4 | Lukáš Dryml | Czech Republic | 10 | (3,2,1,1,3) |
| 5 | Damian Baliński | Poland | 10 | (2,2,3,2,1) |
| 6 | Renat Gafurov | Russia | 10 | (2,2,3,1,2) |
| 7 | David Ruud | Sweden | 9 | (0,3,2,3,1) |
| 8 | Matej Ferjan | Slovenia | 8 | (2,1,1,3,1) |
| 9 | Piotr Świderski | Poland | 7 | (2,X,0,2,3) |
| 10 | Laszlo Szatmari | Hungary | 6 | (1,2,2,1,X) |
| 11 | Tomasz Gapiński | Poland | 5 | (1,1,1,0,2) |
| 12 | Peter Ljung | Sweden | 4 | (1,F,0,2,1) |
| 13 | Michał Szczepaniak | Poland | 3 | (3,0,X,0,0) |
| 14 | Henrik Møller | Denmark | 3 | (0,1,0,1,1) |
| 15 | Daniele Tessari | Italy | 2 | (0,0,2,0,0) |
| 16 | Sławomir Drabik | Poland | 1 | (X,0,1,0,E) |
| R1 | Henning Bager | Denmark | - | - |
| R2 | Tomáš Suchánek | Czech Republic | - | - |
