= Alessandro Milanese =

Italian speedway rider

- Nationality: Italian

Career history

Italy
- 2001: MC Lonigo
- 2002: Badia Calavena
- 2005: Giavera del Montello
- 2006: Olimpia Terenzano
- 2007-2014: LaFavorita Sarego

Individual honours
- 1988: Junior Italian Champion

Alessandro Milanese is an Italian former motorcycle speedway rider who is a member of Italy's national team.

== Career ==
Milanese started at 2008 Italian Grand Prix.

In 2014, Milanese started his eighth league season for MC La Favorita Sarego. In 2017, he continued to be capped by the Italian national team as part of their World Cup team.

Despite his age, Milanese competed in the 2023 Italian Championship.

== Results ==
=== World Championships ===
- Individual Speedway World Championship (Speedway Grand Prix)
  - 2008 - 34th place (0 points in one event)
- Team World Championship (Speedway World Team Cup and Speedway World Cup)
  - 2007 - 3rd place in Qualifying round 2
  - 2008 - 4th place in Qualifying round 2

=== European Championships ===
- Individual European Championship
  - 2008 - 12th place in Qualifying Round 3
  - 2009 - 13th place in Semi-Final 1
- European Pairs Championship
  - 2008 - 6th place in Semi-Final 2
- European Club Champions' Cup
  - 1999 - 1st place in Group B

=== Italian Championships ===
- Individual Junior Italian Championship
  - 1988 - Italian Champion

== See also ==
- Italy national speedway team
- List of Speedway Grand Prix riders
