= Individual Speedway European Championship =

Annual individual speedway event

- Current season, competition or edition: 2026 Speedway European Championship
- Sport: motorcycle speedway
- Founded: 2001 (previously European Final 1955-75)
- No. of teams: 16 riders
- Most recent champion: (Denmark) Leon Madsen (2026)

The Individual Speedway European Championship is an annual individual speedway event organized by the European Motorcycle Union (UEM) to determine the champion of Europe. The competition was founded in 2001 and was initially staged as a one-off meeting before the single event was replaced by the Speedway European Championship series in 2012.

== History ==
From 1955 to 1975, the European Final was staged as the final qualifying round for the World Speedway Championship, although this did not include British riders who had a separate qualifying round.

The European Championships were inaugurated in 2001, organised by European Motorcycle Union (UEM). In 2012 this was replaced by a series of four finals. Regardless of that, ISEC was struggling with prestige and promotion and the best European riders were mostly avoiding this contest.

On 20 December 2012, at a press conference in Warsaw, Poland it was announced that the competition would be replaced by a new series similar in format to the Speedway Grand Prix. The Speedway European Championship series is promoted by One Sporta Ltd. from Poland for next three seasons (2013-2015).

As of 2022, the competition is staged over four rounds in a Grand Prix format, with the winner being the rider who accumulates the most points over the four rounds. The minimum age of a rider to compete is 16 years of age (starting on the date of the rider's birthday).

Denmark is the most successful nation having had seven champions, Jesper B. Jensen (2005), Nicki Pedersen (2016), Leon Madsen (2018 and 2022) and Mikkel Michelsen (2019, 2021 and 2023).

== Winners ==
=== European Final (1955-1975) ===
Year	Venue	Winners	2nd place	3rd place
1955	(Norway) Oslo	(Norway) Henry Andersen	(Sweden) Olle Nygren	(Sweden) Kjell Carlsson
1956	(Norway) Oslo	(Sweden) Ove Fundin	(Sweden) Per Olof Söderman	(Sweden) Ole Andersson
1957	(Sweden) Växjö	(Sweden) Rune Sörmander	(Sweden) Per Olof Söderman	(West Germany) Josef Hofmeister
1958	(Poland) Warsaw	(Sweden) Ove Fundin	(West Germany) Josef Hofmeister	(Sweden) Rune Sörmander
1959	(Sweden) Gothenburg	(Sweden) Ove Fundin	(West Germany) Josef Hofmeister	(Poland) Mieczysław Połukard
1960	(Poland) Wrocław	(Poland) Marian Kaiser	(Sweden) Ove Fundin	(Poland) Stefan Kwoczała
1961	(Austria) Wieden	(Sweden) Ove Fundin	(Sweden) Björn Knutson	(Soviet Union) Igor Plekhanov
1962	(Norway) Oslo	(Sweden) Björn Knutson	(Sweden) Ove Fundin	(Sweden) Göte Nordin
1963	(Sweden) Gothenburg	(Sweden) Björn Knutson	(Sweden) Ove Fundin	(Sweden) Per Olof Söderman
1964	(Poland) Wrocław	(Poland) Zbigniew Podlecki	(Sweden) Björn Knutson	(Soviet Union) Boris Samorodov
1965	(Czechoslovakia) Slaný	(Sweden) Ove Fundin	(Sweden) Björn Knutson	(Poland) Antoni Woryna
1966	(England) Wembley	(New Zealand) Ivan Mauger	(New Zealand) Barry Briggs	(Poland) Antoni Woryna
1967	(Poland) Wrocław	(Poland) Andrzej Wyglenda	(Poland) Andrzej Pogorzelski	(Poland) Antoni Woryna
1968	(Poland) Wrocław	(Poland) Paweł Waloszek	(Poland) Antoni Woryna	(Poland) Jerzy Trzeszkowski
1969	(West Germany) Olching	(Soviet Union) Valeri Klementiev	(Poland) Edward Jancarz	(Sweden) Torbjörn Harrysson
1970	(Soviet Union) Leningrad	(New Zealand) Ivan Mauger	(Soviet Union) Vladimir Gordeev	(Soviet Union) Gennady Kurilenko
1971	(England) Wembley	(New Zealand) Ivan Mauger	(England) Ray Wilson	(Denmark) Ole Olsen
1972	(Poland) Wrocław	(Poland) Paweł Waloszek	(Denmark) Ole Olsen	(Sweden) Anders Michanek
1973	(West Germany) Abensberg	(Sweden) Anders Michanek	(New Zealand) Ivan Mauger	(Soviet Union) Vladimir Paznikov
1974	(England) Wembley	(England) Peter Collins	(Denmark) Ole Olsen	(New Zealand) Ivan Mauger
1975	(Poland) Bydgoszcz	(New Zealand) Ivan Mauger	(Denmark) Ole Olsen	(Australia) Phil Crump

=== Individual European Championship (2001-2011) ===
Year	Venue	Winners	2nd place	3rd place
2001	(Belgium) Heusden Zolder	(Czech Republic) Bohumil Brhel (14 pts)	(Poland) Mariusz Staszewski (13 pts)	(Poland) Krzysztof Cegielski (12+3 pts)
2002	(Poland) Rybnik	(Sweden) Magnus Zetterström (12+3 pts)	(Poland) Krzysztof Kasprzak (12+2 pts)	(Poland) Rafał Szombierski (11+3 pts)
2003	(Czech Republic) Slaný	(Poland) Krzysztof Kasprzak (12+3 pts)	(Poland) Sławomir Drabik (12+2 pts)	(Sweden) Magnus Zetterström (11 pts)
2004	(Denmark) Holsted	(Slovenia) Matej Žagar (14+3 pts)	(Slovenia) Matej Ferjan (14+2 pts)	(Denmark) Hans N. Andersen (12 pts)
2005	(Italy) Lonigo	(Denmark) Jesper B. Jensen (14+3 pts)	(Czech Republic) Aleš Dryml, Jr. (14+2 pts)	(Finland) Kai Laukkanen (12 pts)
2006	(Hungary) Miskolc	(Poland) Krzysztof Jabłoński (13+3 pts)	(Poland) Grzegorz Walasek (13+2 pts)	(Germany) Christian Hefenbrock (12 pts)
2007	(Austria) Wiener Neustadt	(Croatia) Jurica Pavlic (14 pts)	(Poland) Sebastian Ułamek (13 pts)	(Denmark) Patrick Hougaard (11 pts)
2008	(Slovenia) Lendava	(Slovenia) Matej Žagar (14 pts)	(Poland) Sebastian Ułamek (10+3+3 pts)	(Denmark) Mads Korneliussen (10+2+2+2)
2009	(Russia) Tolyatti	(Russia) Renat Gafurov (13+3 pts)	(Ukraine) Andriy Karpov (13+2 pts)	(Czech Republic) Aleš Dryml, Jr. (13+1 pts)
2010	(Poland) Tarnów	(Poland) Sebastian Ułamek (15 pts)	(Czech Republic) Aleš Dryml, Jr. (12 pts)	(Ukraine) Andriy Karpov (11+3 pts)
2011	(Ukraine) Rivne	(Russia) Grigory Laguta (14+3 pts)	(Poland) Tomasz Gapinski (14+2 pts)	(Czech Republic) Aleš Dryml, Jr. (12 pts)

=== European Championship series (since 2012) ===
Year	Venue	Winners	Runner-up	3rd place
2012	Four events	(Czech Republic) Aleš Dryml, Jr. (48 pts)	(Poland) Robert Miśkowiak (44 pts)	(Ukraine) Andriy Karpov (43 pts)
2013	Four events	(Slovakia) Martin Vaculik (47 pts)	(Denmark) Nicki Pedersen (44 pts)	(Russia) Grigory Laguta (42 pts)
2014	Four events	(Russia) Emil Sayfutdinov (54 pts)	(Denmark) Peter Kildemand (48 pts)	(Denmark) Nicki Pedersen (44 pts)
2015	Four events	(Russia) Emil Sayfutdinov (58 pts)	(Denmark) Nicki Pedersen (55 pts)	(Sweden) Antonio Lindbäck (51 pts)
2016	Four events	(Denmark) Nicki Pedersen (40 pts)	(Czech Republic) Václav Milík (38 pts)	(Poland) Krzysztof Kasprzak (38 pts)
2017	Four events	(Latvia) Andžejs Ļebedevs (52 pts)	(Russia) Artem Laguta (45 pts)	(Czech Republic) Václav Milík (44 pts)
2018	Four events	(Denmark) Leon Madsen (56 pts)	(Poland) Jarosław Hampel (45 pts)	(United Kingdom) Robert Lambert (41 pts)
2019	Four events	(Denmark) Mikkel Michelsen (45 pts)	(Russia) Grigory Laguta (45 pts)	(Denmark) Leon Madsen (39 pts)
2020	Five events	(United Kingdom) Robert Lambert (67 pts)	(Denmark) Leon Madsen (64 pts)	(Russia) Grigory Laguta (52 pts)
2021	Four events	(Denmark) Mikkel Michelsen (53 pts)	(Denmark) Leon Madsen (51 pts)	(Poland) Patryk Dudek (46 pts)
2022	Four events	(Denmark) Leon Madsen (53 pts)	(Poland) Janusz Kołodziej (52 pts)	(Denmark) Mikkel Michelsen (45 pts)
2023	Four events	(Denmark) Mikkel Michelsen (52 pts)	(Denmark) Leon Madsen (44 pts)	(Poland) Janusz Kołodziej (42 pts)
2024	Four events	(Latvia) Andžejs Ļebedevs (50 pts)	(Denmark) Leon Madsen (47 pts)	(Poland) Kacper Woryna (44 pts)
2025	Four events	(Poland) Patryk Dudek (56 pts)	(Latvia) Andžejs Ļebedevs (48 pts)	(Denmark) Leon Madsen (40 pts)
2026	Four events	(Denmark) Leon Madsen (47 pts)	(Poland) Maciej Janowski (46 pts)	(Poland) Kacper Woryna (42 pts)

== Medals classification ==
Pos	National Team	Total	Gold	Silver	Bronze
1.	Denmark	22	8	7	7
2.	Poland	22	4	11	7
3.	Russia	8	4	2	2
4.	Czech Republic	7	2	3	2
5.	Slovenia	3	2	1	
	Latvia	3	2	1	
7.	Sweden	3	1		2
8.	Great Britain	2	1		1
9.	Croatia	1	1		
	Slovakia	1	1		
11.	Ukraine	3		1	2
12.	Finland	1			1
	Germany	1			1

== See also ==
- Motorcycle speedway
- Speedway Grand Prix
