= Kyle Legault =

Canadian speedway rider (born 1985)

- Born: May 30, 1985 (age 41); St. Catharines, Ontario, Canada

Career history

Great Britain
- 2005–2006: Sheffield Tigers
- 2007: Mildenhall Fen Tigers
- 2008: Birmingham Brummies
- 2009: Poole Pirates
- 2010-2011: Newport Wasps

Denmark
- 2008: Grindsted

Individual honours
- 2003, 2004, 2006: Canadian champion
- 2009: Argentinian Champion

Kyle Patrick Legault (born May 30, 1985 in St. Catharines, Ontario) is a Canadian former motorcycle speedway rider.

== Career ==
Legault is a three-time Canadian individual speedway champion; winning in 2003, 2004 and 2006. He began his British speedway career in 2005, with Premier League team the Sheffield Tigers where he recorded a 5.80 average in his first season. Legault remained with Sheffield in 2006 and the team reached the Premier League play-off final and the final of the Premier Trophy, but lost both finals to the King's Lynn Stars.

Legault switched to the Mildenhall Fen Tigers for 2007 and recorded an improved average of 8.77 by the end of the season. He also reached the final round of the 2008 Speedway Grand Prix qualifiers at Vojens, Denmark, but fell during his first heat and fractured his right wrist. In 2008, Legault moved to the Birmingham Brummies. However, in only Birmingham's second meeting of the season he was involved in a crash and suffered a broken fibula. It was thought that Legault would miss the remainder of the season, but he returned 12 weeks later to take part in a 2009 Speedway Grand Prix qualification round. He resumed racing for Birmingham in July, but broke his jaw and was ruled out for the rest of the season after he was involved in a crash at Sheffield on 21 August.

Legault moved up to the Elite League in 2009 after signing a one-year loan deal with 2008 champions the Poole Pirates. However, at the beginning of the season, Legault suffered complications with the fibula he broke in 2008 and was required to undergo further surgery. Poole signed Paul Hurry as a temporary replacement but Legault missed the entire 2009 season.

In 2009, Legault won the Argentine Championship. In 2010, Legault moved to Newport Wasps following recovery from injury. He completed his final season with Newport in 2011.
