= Kamil Brzozowski =

Polish speedway rider

- Born: 25 February 1987 (age 39); Gorzów, Poland
- Nationality: Polish

Career history

Poland
- 2003–2006: Gorzów
- 2007–2011: Grudziądz
- 2011–2012, 2015–2016: Gdańsk
- 2013: Toruń
- 2014, 2017–2018: Ostrów
- 2019–2020: Bydgoszcz
- 2021: Opole

Great Britain
- 2010: Peterborough

Denmark
- 2019: Esbjerg

Kamil Brzozowski (born 25 February 1987) is a former motorcycle speedway rider from Poland.

== Speedway career ==
Brzozowski rode in the top tier of British Speedway riding for the Peterborough Panthers during the 2010 Elite League speedway season.
