= Aleš Dryml Jr. =

Czech speedway rider

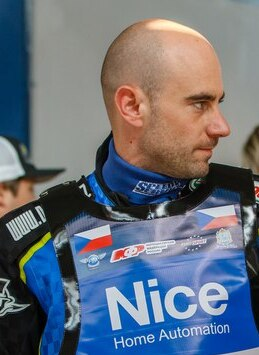
- Born: 19 October 1979 (age 47); Pardubice, Czech Republic
- Nationality: Czech

Career history

Czech Republic
- 1996-2015: Pardubice

Great Britain
- 2000–2002, 2006–2007: Oxford Cheetahs
- 2004, 2005, 2009, 2014: Peterborough Panthers
- 2003: Poole Pirates
- 2008: Wolverhampton Wolves
- 2010: Ipswich Witches
- 2011: Birmingham Brummies
- 2012, 2013: Belle Vue Aces

Poland
- 1999: Rybnik
- 2001–2002: Leszno
- 2006–2007: Toruń
- 2008: Tarnów
- 2009: Rzeszów
- 2010: Miskolc
- 2012: Gniezno
- 2013: Grudziądz
- 2014: Ostrów
- 2015: Lublin

Sweden
- 2002: Örnarna
- 2003–2005, 2008: Vetlanda
- 2006–2007: Masarna

Individual honours
- 2012: European Champion
- 2011, 2013: Czech Republic Speedway Championship
- 2012: Czech Longtrack Champion
- 1999: German U21 Champion

Team honours
- 2004, 2007, 2009, 2010: European Pairs Champion
- 2015: Czech Pairs Champion
- 2001, 2003: Elite League Champions
- 2012, 2014: Polish League Champions
- 2004: Swedish Elitserien Champions
- 1999, 2001, 2002, 2004, 2008, 2013, 2015, 2016: Czech League Champions

Aleš Dryml Jr. (born 19 October 1979) is a Czech former motorcycle speedway rider. He earned 23 international caps for the Czech Republic national speedway team.

== Career ==
Dryml and his younger brother Lukáš Dryml were introduced to speedway by their father Aleš Dryml Sr., who was a former international speedway rider.

Dryml came to the British speedway leagues in 2000 when he and his brother Lukáš Dryml joined the Oxford Cheetahs for the 2002 Elite League speedway season. The pair came into the Oxford side relatively unknown because they had only ridden in the Czech Republic and Poland at the time. However, the British Authorities gave them inflated averages of 7.50 and 5.00, which would not help Oxford's 2000 league challenge as they finished second from last.

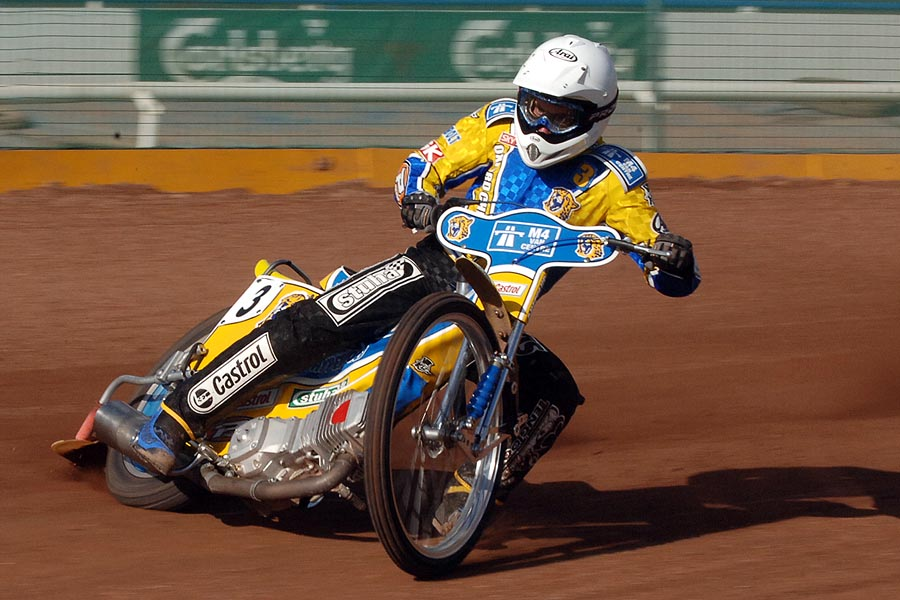
Dryml riding for Oxford in 2007

The following season in 2001, Oxford brought in Leigh Adams as heat leader and retained the Dryml brothers on reduced averages, this combination was a winning one, as the three riders were instrumental in helping Oxford win the 2001 Elite League. Dryml also finished second in the German Individual Speedway Championship. After the 2002 season with Oxford, Dryml joined the Belle Vue Aces for the 2003 Elite League speedway season but was released so joined the Poole Pirates as a replacement for his brother who had broken his leg. Ales helped Poole finish the season as the league and cup double winners.

In 2004, Dryml joined Peterborough Panthers and would also win his first of four European Pairs Speedway Championships. The other would come in 2007, 2009 and 2010. He also became a permanent rider of 2004 Speedway Grand Prix series.

After the 2005 season with Peterborough, Dryml returned to his first club Oxford during 2006 and 2007, but rarely rode as his form dipped. However, he continued to ride in British speedway until the end of the 2014 season with Peterborough where he recorded a strong 7.90 average. He also represented the Czech Republic at the Speedway World Cup from 1999 to 2014.

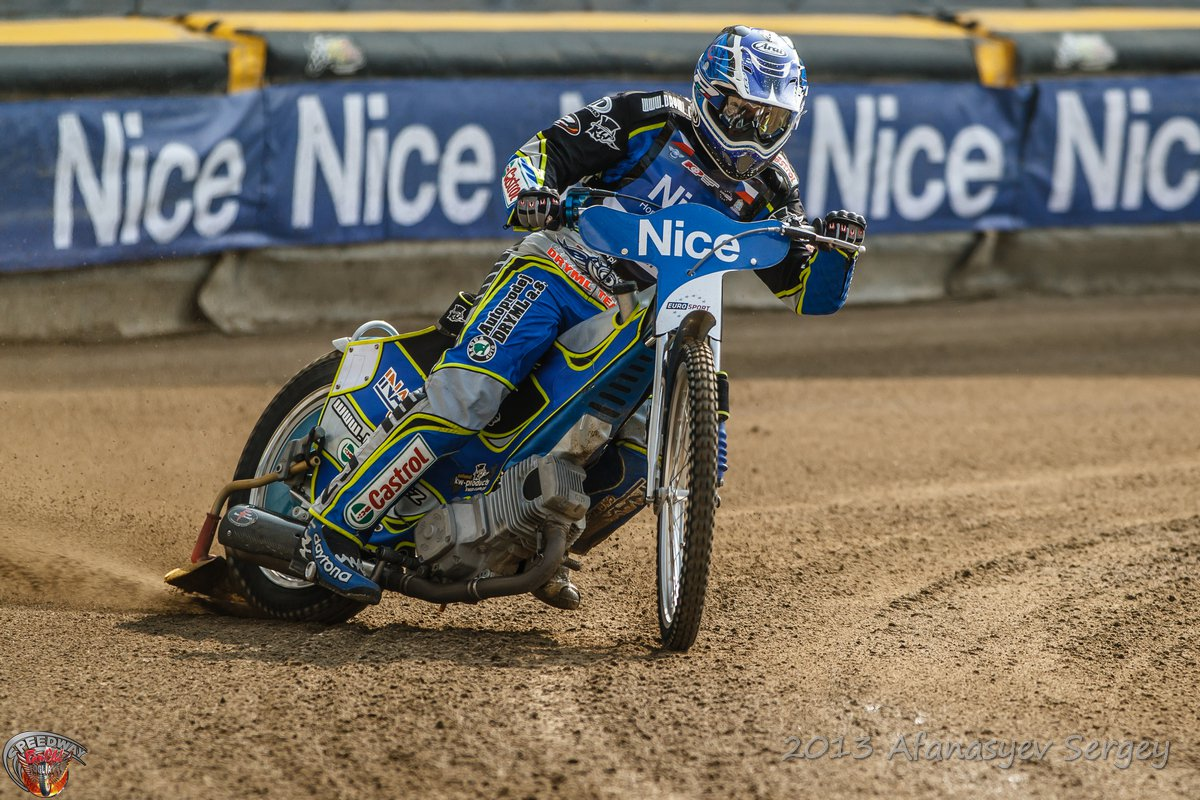
Dryml in action

== Results ==
- Individual World Championship (Speedway Grand Prix)
  - 2002 - 41st place (1 point)
  - 2003 - 36th place (3 points)
  - 2004 - 22nd place (22 points)
  - 2005 - 26th place (3 points)
  - 2013 - 17th place (16 points)
- Individual U-21 World Championship
  - 1999 - 2nd place (11 points)
  - 2000 - 4th place (11+X points)
- Team World Championship (Speedway World Cup)
  - 1999 - 2nd place (10 points)
  - 2001 - 7th place (9 points in Race-Off)
  - 2002 - 5th place (13 points)
  - 2003 - 6th place (11 points in Race-Off)
  - 2004 - 6th place (4 points in Race-Off)
  - 2005 - 6th place (4 points in Race-Off)
  - 2007 - 9th place (10 points in Qualifying Round 2)
  - 2008 - 7th place (0 points in Event 2)
  - 2009 - 8th place
  - 2010 - 8th place
  - 2011 - 7th place
  - 2012 - 7th place
  - 2013 - 4th place
  - 2014 - 7th place
- Individual European Championship
  - 2001 - 10th place (7 points)
  - 2005 - 2nd place (14+2 points)
  - 2009 - 3rd place (13 points)
  - 2010 - 2nd place (12 points)
  - 2011 - 3rd place (12 points)
  - 2012 - European Champion
- Individual U-19 European Championship
  - 1998 - 2nd place (13 points)
- European Pairs Championship
  - 2004 - European Champion (12 points)
  - 2005 - 2nd place (14 points)
  - 2006 - 4th place, but injury in Final (8 points in Semi-Final 1)
  - 2007 - European Champion (10 points)
  - 2009 - European Champion
  - 2010 - European Champion (13 points)
- Individual Czech Republic Championship
  - 2011 - Czech Champion
  - 2013 - Czech Champion
- Individual Junior Czech Republic Championship
  - 2004 - 3rd place (13+1 points)
  - 2005 - 4th place (12+0 points)
- Individual Czech Republic Long Track Championship
  - 2012 - Czech Champion
- Czech Republic Pairs Championship
  - 2015 - Czech Champions
- Czech Golden Helmet
  - 2004 - 2nd place
  - 2005 - 3rd place
- Individual German Championship
  - 1998 - 3rd place (12 points)
  - 1999 - 10th place
  - 2000 - 5th place (10 points)
  - 2001 - 2nd place (13+2 points)
  - 2003 - 6th place
- Individual Junior German Championship
  - 1996 - 2nd place
  - 1998 - German Champion

== World Longtrack Championship ==
Grand-Prix

- 2012 - Qualifying Round

Team Championship

- 2011 (Germany) Scheeßel (4th) 7/36pts (Rode with Josef Franc, Richard Wolff, Pavel Ondrasik.
- 2012 (France) St. Macaire (5th) 16/30 (Rode with Josef Franc, Richard Wolff, Michael Hadek.

== European Grasstrack Championship ==
- 2011 (England) Skegness (13th)5pts
- 2012 (Netherlands) Eenrum (6th) 20pts

== See also ==
- List of Speedway Grand Prix riders
- Czech Republic national speedway team
