= Jan Jaroš =

Czech speedway rider

- Born: 11 November 1984 (age 42); Strakonice, Czech Republic
- Nationality: Czech

Career history

Great Britain
- 2004: Belle Vue
- 2003, 2005: King's Lynn
- 2006: Ipswich

Poland
- 2007: Prague
- 2008-2011: Krosno

Jan Jaroš (born 11 November 1984) is a former motorcycle speedway rider from the Czech Republic.

== Speedway career ==
Jaroš rode in the top tier of British Speedway riding for Belle Vue Aces during the 2004 Elite League speedway season and Ipswich Witches during the 2006 Elite League speedway season. He also rode in the second division for King's Lynn Stars, making his debut during the 2003 Premier League speedway season but only completed a couple of fixtures for the team that season.

Although he rode for Belle Vue in 2004, Jaroš missed out on a place in the King's Lynn team but returned to King's Lynn for the 2005 Premier League speedway season and enjoyed a better season being an ever-present in the team. The following season in 2006, he rode for Ipswich Witches, which turned out to be his last season in British speedway.
