= Martin Málek =

Czech speedway rider

- Born: 21 August 1985 (age 41); Gottwaldov, Czechoslovakia
- Nationality: Czech

Career history

Czech Republic

Poland
- 2006–2013: Krosno

Team honours
- 2022: World Longtrack Team silver

Martin Málek (born 21 August 1985) is a Czech long track and motorcycle speedway rider.

== Career ==
Málek rode for KSŻ Krosno in the Team Speedway Polish Championship for multiple years but then concentrated on longtrack racing.

Málek won bronze medals at the 2016 Team Long Track World Championship and the 2019 Team Long Track World Championship, riding with Hynek Štichauer and Josef Franc.

In 2022, Málek was part of the Czech team, along with Štichauer and Franc, that won the silver medal at the 2022 Team Long Track World Championship. He also finished in 13th place during the 2022 Individual Long Track World Championship.
