= Andriy Karpov =

Ukrainian speedway rider

- Born: 16 January 1987 (age 39); Ukraine
- Nationality: Ukrainian

Career history

Poland
- 2004: Lviv
- 2005: Rivne
- 2006: Rzeszów
- 2007–2008: Gdańsk
- 2009–2011: Rybnik
- 2012–2014: Grudziądz
- 2015: Kraków
- 2016–2017: Zielona Góra
- 2019–2020: Krosno

Sweden
- 2017: Smederna

Denmark
- 2009–2016: Holstebro
- 2018–2019: Region Varde

Individual honours
- 2009: European Championship silver
- 2010, 2012: European Championship bronze
- 2006: European Junior Championship silver

Team honours
- 2012: European Pairs champion

Andriy Karpov (born 16 January 1987) also spelt Andriej Karpov is a motorcycle speedway rider from Ukraine.

== Career ==
Karpov came to prominence when competing the Polish leagues, initially for the Ukrainian teams in Polish Speedway Second League but then in the Ekstraliga for Rzeszów in 2006.

It was during 2006 that Karpov won a silver medal at the European Individual Speedway Junior Championship. He quickly gained full international caps for the Ukraine national speedway team and represented them in the European Pairs Speedway Championship.

Karpov reached the final of the 2008 Speedway Under-21 World Championship and started competing in the Individual European Championship, where he won a silver medal at the 2009 Individual Speedway European Championship. He won further medals by winning bronze in 2010 and 2012.

Karpov stood as a qualified substitute for the 2011 Speedway Grand Prix (the World Championship) after reaching the Grand Prix Challenge final during the 2011 Speedway Grand Prix Qualification. He also started racing in the Danish Speedway League.

Karpov's finest moment arrived after he won the gold medal at the 2012 European Pairs Speedway Championship, where he partnered Aleksandr Loktaev. In 2017, he signed for Smederna in the Swedish league.

Karpov has represented Ukraine three times in the World Cup. He was also named in the 2022 World Cup squad.

== Results ==
=== World team Championships ===
- 2012 Speedway World Cup - qualifying round
- 2013 Speedway World Cup - qualifying round
- 2018 Speedway of Nations - race off 1
