= Renat Gafurov =

Russian speedway rider

- Born: 8 October 1982 (age 44); Oktiabrsky, Russia
- Nationality: Russian

Career history

Russia
- 1999–2005, 2015, 2023: Oktyabrsky
- 2006–2007, 2009–2014: Vladivostok
- 2016–2022: Togliatti
- 2008: Salavat

Poland
- 2003: Rawicz
- 2005–2007, 2019: Rybnik
- 2008–2017: Gdańsk
- 2018: Ostrów

Great Britain
- 2005: Oxford Silver Machine
- 2006: Swindon Robins
- 2011: Poole Pirates
- 2012: Belle Vue Aces

Sweden
- 2007: Kaparna
- 2008, 2011: Hammarby
- 2009–2010: Indianerna

Denmark
- 2013: Holsted

Germany
- 2012–2014: Landshut

Individual honours
- 2009: European Champion
- 2006, 2009: Russian Champion

Team honours
- 2004: European Pairs Championship silver

Renat Zaytunovich Gafurov (Russian: Ренат Зайтунович Гафуров) (born 8 October 1982) is a former motorcycle speedway rider from Russia. He earned 16 caps for the Russia national speedway team.

== Career ==
After representing Russia in the 2003 Speedway World Cup, Gafurov won the silver medal with Simon Vlasov and Siergiej Filiushin at the 2004 European Pairs Speedway Championship in Debrecen, Hungary.

Gafurov began his British leagues career when he signed for Oxford Silver Machine during the 2005 Elite League speedway season but only rode in three fixtures, although he did represent Russia again the 2005 World Cup.

Gafurov came to prominence after winning the Russian national championship in 2006. He also enjoyed a better season in Britain with the Swindon Robins.

In 2009, Gafurov secured a second Russian national title and also won the 2009 Individual European Championship.

In 2011, Gafurov won 2011 European Speedway Club Champions' Cup with Vostok Vladivostok and returned to the British Leagues with Poole Pirates. In 2012, he signed for Belle Vue Aces.

== Honours ==
- Speedway World Cup
  - 2003 - 8th place (5th place in Race-off
  - 2004 - 7th place (4th place in Event 1
  - 2007 - 6th place (4th place in Race-off
  - 2008 - 6th place (4th place in Race-off
- Individual European Championship
  - 2004 - (Denmark) Holsted - 7th place (8 points)
  - 2005 - (Italy) Lonigo - 6th place (10 points)
  - 2007 - 11th place in Semi-Final A
  - 2009 - (Russia) Tolyatti - European Champion (13 pts + 1st)
- Individual U-19 European Championship
  - 2000 - (Slovenia) Ljubljana - 8th place (8 points)
  - 2001 - (Czech Republic) Pardubice - 16th place (1 point)
- European Pairs Championship
  - 2004 - (Hungary) Debrecen - Silver medal (13 points)
  - 2007 - (Italy) Terenzano - Bronze medal (12 points)
  - 2008 - (Austria) Natschbach-Loipersbach - Bronze medal (13 points)
- European Club Champions' Cup
  - 2001 - (Latvia) Daugavpils - Silver medal (4 points)
  - 2009 - (Poland) Toruń - 3rd place (11 pts) Vladivostok

== See also ==
- Russia national speedway team
