= 2001 Speedway Grand Prix Qualification =

The 2001 Speedway Grand Prix Qualification or GP Challenge was a series of motorcycle speedway meetings used to determine the 12 riders that would qualify for the 2001 Speedway Grand Prix to join the other 10 riders that finished in the leading positions from the 2000 Speedway Grand Prix.

The format was similar to the previous year, in that 2 riders would qualify straight from the Intercontinental and Continental finals and 10 riders would qualify through the GP Challenge.

Peter Karlsson won the GP Challenge.

== Format ==
- First Round - 6 riders from Sweden, 5 from Denmark, 3 from Norway, 2 from Finland to Scandinavian Final
- First Round - 27 riders from Continental quarter finals to Continental semi-finals
- First Round - 8 riders from British Final to Overseas Final
- First Round - 2 riders from Australian Final to Overseas Final
- First Round - 1 rider from New Zealand Final to Overseas Final
- First Round - 3 riders from United States Final to Overseas Final
- Second Round - 8 riders from Scandinavian Final to Intercontinental Final
- Second Round - 8 riders from Overseas Final to Intercontinental Final
- Second Round - 16 riders from Continental semi-finals to Continental Final
- Third Round - 11 riders from positions 11-21 from the 2000 Grand Prix, World U21 champion & host rider to GP Challenge
- Third Round - 1 rider from the Continental Final to 2001 Grand Prix and 4 to GP Challenge
- Third Round - 1 rider from the Intercontinental Final to 2001 Grand Prix and 7 to GP Challenge
- Final Round - 10 riders from the GP Challenge to the 2001 Grand Prix

== First round ==
=== Continental quarter finals ===
QF (30 Apr (Italy) Terenzano)
| Pos | Rider | Points |
|---|---|---|
| 1 | (Poland) Rafał Okoniewski | 13+ |
| 2 | (Poland) Adam Skórnicki | 13+ |
| 3 | (Italy) Andrea Maida | 12 |
| 4 | (Croatia) Zlatko Krznaric | 11 |
| 5 | (Italy) Alessandro Dalla Valle | 9 |
| 6 | (Hungary) Zoltán Adorján | 9 |
| 7 | (Czech Republic) Bohumil Brhel | 8 |
| 8 | (Czech Republic) Lukáš Dryml | 7 |
| 9 | (Italy) Simone Terenzani | 7 |
| 10 | (Czech Republic) Aleš Dryml Jr. | 7 |
| 11 | (Hungary) László Szatmári | 7 |
| 12 | (Russia) Rinat Mardanshin | 6 |
| 13 | (Russia) Tolgat Galeev | 3 |
| 14 | (Italy) Simone Tadiello | 3 |
| 15 | (France) Stéphane Trésarrieu | 2 |
| 16 | (France) Sebastien Trésarrieu | 2 |
| 17 | (Russia) Eduard Shajkoulin | 1 |

QF (14 May (Germany) Pfaffenhofen)
| Pos | Rider | Points |
|---|---|---|
| 1 | (Poland) Piotr Protasiewicz | 15 |
| 2 | (Germany) Joachim Kugelmann | 13 |
| 3 | (Poland) Grzegorz Walasek | 12 |
| 4 | (Hungary) Róbert Nagy | 11 |
| 5 | (Russia) Sergej Darkin | 11 |
| 6 | (Germany) Mirko Wolter | 9 |
| 7 | (Latvia) Nikolaj Kokins | 8 |
| 8 | (Czech Republic) Antonín Šváb Jr. | 8 |
| 9 | (Russia) Sergej Eroschin | 7 |
| 10 | (Czech Republic) Michal Makovský | 7 |
| 11 | (Germany) Steffen Mell | 6 |
| 12 | (Austria) Toni Pilotto | 5 |
| 13 | (Hungary) Attila Stefáni | 5 |
| 14 | (Latvia) Vladimir Voronkovs | 2 |
| 15 | (Netherlands) Erik Eijbergen | 1 |
| 16 | (Netherlands) Uilke Kooistra | 0 |
| 17 | (Germany) Stefan Bachhuber | 0 |
| 18 | (Germany) Herbert Rudolph | 0 |

QF (14 May Krško)
| Pos | Rider | Points |
|---|---|---|
| 1 | (Slovenia) Matej Ferjan | 15 |
| 2 | (Poland) Robert Sawina | 12 |
| 3 | (Italy) Armando Castagna | 10 |
| 4 | (Poland) Tomasz Bajerski | 10 |
| 5 | (Slovenia) Izak Šantej | 9 |
| 6 | (Poland) Piotr Świst | 9 |
| 7 | (Czech Republic) Adrian Rymel | 9 |
| 8 | (Slovenia) Tomas Sustersic | 8 |
| 9 | (Czech Republic) Tomáš Topinka | 8 |
| 10 | (Czech Republic) Marián Jirout | 8 |
| 11 | (Czech Republic) Pavel Ondrašík | 7 |
| 12 | (Italy) Stefano Alfonso | 5 |
| 13 | (Austria) Thomas Stadler | 4 |
| 14 | (Argentina) Emiliano Sanchez | 4 |
| 15 | (Ukraine) Vladimir Trofimov | 1 |
| 16 | (Ukraine) Volodymyr Kolodij | 1 |

== Second round ==
=== Overseas Final ===
8 riders to Intercontinental Final

=== Scandinavian Final ===
8 riders to Intercontinental Final

(18 June 2000 (Norway) Elgane)
| Pos | Rider | Points |
|---|---|---|
| 1 | (Norway) Rune Holta | 13 |
| 2 | (Norway) Lars Gunnestad | 13 |
| 3 | (Denmark) Nicki Pedersen | 12 |
| 4 | (Sweden) Stefan Andersson | 11 |
| 5 | (Sweden) Niklas Klingberg | 10 |
| 6 | (Denmark) John Jørgensen | 9 |
| 7 | (Sweden) Peter Nahlin | 9 |
| 8 | (Denmark) Bjarne Pedersen | 9 |
| 9 | (Denmark) Jesper B Jensen | 9 |
| 10 | (Finland) Kai Laukkanen | 7 |
| 11 | (Sweden) Andreas Jonsson | 6 |
| 12 | (Sweden) Claes Ivarsson | 4 |
| 13 | (Denmark) Ronni Pedersen | 3 |
| 14 | (Sweden) Peter Ingvar Karlsson | 3 |
| 15 | (Finland) Tomi Reima | 1 |
| 16 | (Norway) Björn G Hansen | 1 |

=== Continental semi finals ===
Continental semi-finals - 16 riders from to Continental final, Armando Castagna seeded to final

SF

- 22 June 2000 (Poland) Gdańsk

| Pos. | Rider | Points |
|---|---|---|
| 1 | (Poland) Piotr Protasiewicz | 11 |
| 2 | (Poland) Sebastian Ulamek | 10 |
| 3 | (Poland) Krzysztof Jabłoński | 10 |
| 4 | (Czech Republic) Antonín Šváb Jr. | 8 |
| 5 | (Poland) Adam Skórnicki | 7 |
| 6 | (Hungary) Zoltán Adorján | 6 |
| 7 | (Slovenia) Izak Šantej | 6 |
| 8 | (Latvia) Nikolaj Kokins | 6 |
| 9 | (Czech Republic) Adrian Rymel | 6 |
| 10 | (Russia) Sergej Darkin | 5 |
| 11 | (Germany) Mirko Wolter | 5 |
| 12 | (Russia) Sergej Eroshin | 5 |
| 13 | (Croatia) Zlatko Krznaric | 4 |
| 14 | (Czech Republic) Tomáš Topinka | 4 |
| 15 | (Italy) Andrea Maida | 2 |
| 16 | (Czech Republic) Michal Makovský | 1 |
| 17 | (Hungary) Sándor Tihanyi | 0 |

SF

- 22 June 2000 (Germany) Olching

| Pos. | Rider | Points |
|---|---|---|
| 1 | (Slovenia) Matej Ferjan | 12 |
| 2 | (Germany) Robert Barth | 11 |
| 3 | (Poland) Piotr Świst | 11 |
| 4 | (Hungary) Róbert Nagy | 11 |
| 5 | (Poland) Grzegorz Walasek | 11 |
| 6 | (Czech Republic) Bohumil Brhel | 9 |
| 7 | (Germany) Joachim Kugelmann | 9 |
| 8 | (Poland) Tomasz Bajerski | 9 |
| 9 | (Italy) Alessandro Dalla Valle | 7 |
| 10 | (Slovenia) Tomas Sustersic | 6 |
| 11 | (Russia) Roman Povazhny | 6 |
| 12 | (Poland) Rafał Okoniewski | 6 |
| 13 | (Czech Republic) Lukáš Dryml | 6 |
| 14 | (Czech Republic) Aleš Dryml Jr. | 3 |
| 15 | (Italy) Armando Castagna | 3 |
| 16 | (Hungary) László Szatmári | 0 |
| 17 | (Czech Republic) Pavel Ondrašík | 0 |
| 18 | (Germany) Steffen Mell | 0 |

== Third round ==
- 11 riders from positions 11-21 from the 2000 Speedway Grand Prix, World U21 champion & host rider to GP Challenge

=== Intercontinental Final ===
1 rider direct to Grand Prix, 7 riders to GP Challenge

=== Continental Final ===
- 1 rider direct to Grand Prix, 4 riders to GP Challenge
- 9 July 2000 (Italy) Lonigo

| Pos. | Rider | Points |
|---|---|---|
| 1 | (Slovenia) Matej Ferjan | 14 |
| 2 | (Poland) Piotr Protasiewicz | 14 |
| 3 | (Poland) Piotr Świst | 13 |
| 4 | (Poland) Sebastian Ułamek | 11 |
| 5 | (Poland) Grzegorz Walasek | 10 |
| 6 | (Poland) Krzysztof Jabłoński | 10 |
| 7 | (Poland) Adam Skórnicki | 8 |
| 8 | (Czech Republic) Bohumil Brhel | 7 |
| 9 | (Italy) Armando Castagna | 7 |
| 10 | (Poland) Tomasz Bajerski | 5 |
| 11 | (Hungary) Róbert Nagy | 5 |
| 12 | (Czech Republic) Antonín Šváb Jr. | 4 |
| 13 | (Slovenia) Izak Šantej | 4 |
| 14 | (Germany) Robert Barth | 3 |
| 15 | (Germany) Joachim Kugelmann | 3 |
| 16 | (Hungary) Zoltán Adorján | 2 |

== Final Round ==
=== GP Challenge ===
10 riders to 2001 Grand Prix

- 8 October 2000 (Germany) Abensberg

| Pos. | Rider | pre-event | main-event | sf | Final |
|---|---|---|---|---|---|
| 1 | (Sweden) Peter Karlsson | x | 2, 2 | 3 | 3 |
| 2 | (England) Carl Stonehewer | x | 0, 3, 3 | 3 | 2 |
| 3 | (Denmark) Nicki Pedersen | 1, 3, 3 | 3 | 2 | 1 |
| 4 | (Norway) Rune Holta | 3, 0, 2 | 1, 2, 3, 2 | 2 | 0 |
| 5 | (Sweden) Mikael Karlsson | x | 3, 3 | 1 | x |
| 6 | (Poland) Piotr Protasiewicz | 2, 0, 3 | 3, 1, 2 | 1 | x |
| 7 | (Sweden) Jimmy Nilsen | x | 2, 2 | 0 | x |
| 8 | (England) Joe Screen | x | 0, 2, 3 | 0 | x |
| 9 | (Denmark) Brian Andersen | 3, 3 | 3, 1, 1 | x | x |
| 10 | (England) Andy Smith | 3, 2 | 2, 0, 1 | x | x |
| 11 | (Sweden) Henrik Gustafsson | x | 2, 0, 0 | x | x |
| 12 | (Poland) Grzegorz Walasek | 2, 3 | 1, 3, 0 | x | x |
| 13 | (Czech Republic) Antonín Kasper Jr. | x | 0, 1 | x | x |
| 14 | (Poland) Rafał Dobrucki | x | 1, 1 | x | x |
| 15 | (Poland) Sebastian Ułamek | 2, 2 | 0 | x | x |
| 16 | (England) Gary Havelock | 1, 3, 2 | 1, 0 | x | x |
| 17 | (Poland) Piotr Świst | 3, 1, 1 | x | x | x |
| 18 | (Australia) Steve Johnston | 0, 2, 1 | x | x | x |
| 19 | (Denmark) Brian Karger | 2, 1, 0 | x | x | x |
| 20 | (Denmark) John Jørgensen | 0, 2, 0 | x | x | x |
| 21 | (Denmark) Jesper B Jensen | 0, 1 | x | x | x |
| 22 | (Sweden) Andreas Jonsson | 0, 1 | x | x | x |
| 23 | (Australia) Jason Lyons | 1, 0 | x | x | x |
| 24 | (Germany) Robert Barth | 1, 0 | x | x | x |
