= Grzegorz Walasek =

Polish speedway rider

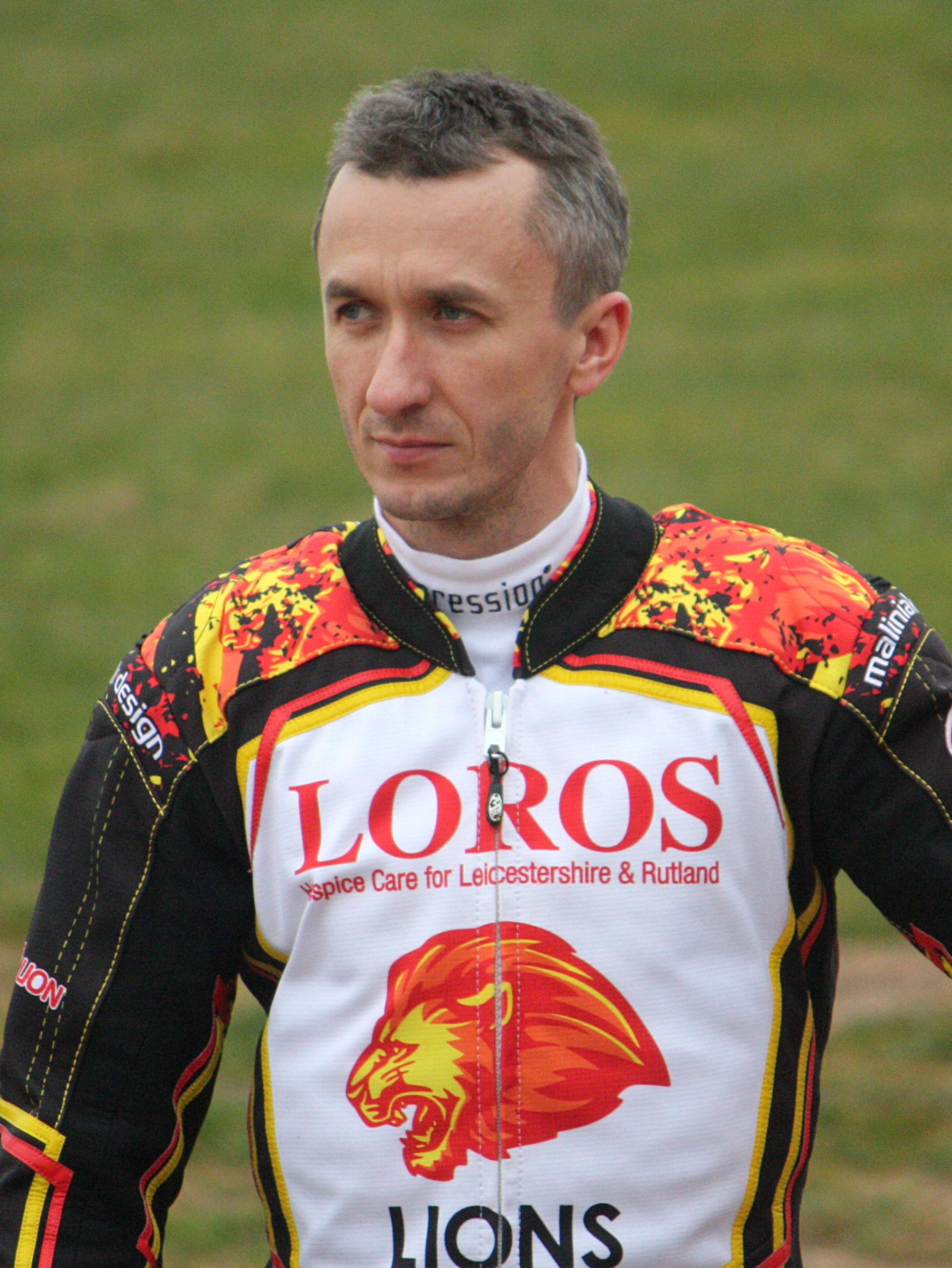
- Born: 29 August 1976 (age 50); Krosno Odrzańskie, Poland
- Nationality: Polish

Career history

Poland
- 1993–1999, 2006–2009, 2015: Zielona Góra
- 2000-2005, 2014: Częstochowa
- 2010–2011: Bydgoszcz
- 2012–2013: Rzeszów
- 2017-2018: Gorzów
- 2019-2023, 2025: Ostrów
- 2024: Rybnik

Sweden
- 1999–2002: Lejonen
- 2000, 2003: Kaparna
- 2005–2008, 2022: Piraterna
- 2009–2010: Indianerna
- 2011–2014: Hammarby
- 2014–2015: Rospiggarna

Great Britain
- 2000–2002, 2005–2006: Poole Pirates
- 2004: Arena Essex Hammers
- 2015–2016: Leicester Lions

Denmark
- 2005–2008: Slangerup
- 2010–2011: Outrup
- 2016–2017: Grindsted

Speedway Grand Prix statistics
- SGP number: 13
- Starts: 22
- Finalist: 1 times

Individual honours
- 1997: Polish Under-21 Champion
- 2004: Polish Individual Champion
- 2007: Golden Helmet Winner
- 2012: Golden Helmet of Pardubice (CZE)

Team honours
- 2001, 2002, 2006: Craven Shield
- 2003, 2009: Ekstraliga Champion
- 2003: Swedish Elitserien Champion
- 2004, 2009: European Club Champions' Cup
- 2005, 2007: Speedway World Cup
- 2000: Swedish Division One Champion

Grzegorz Walasek [ˈɡrzɛɡɔrz vaˈlasɛk] (born 29 August 1976) is a Polish motorcycle speedway rider who has competed in the Speedway Grand Prix series and earned 15 international caps for the Poland national speedway team.

== Career ==
Born in Krosno Odrzańskie, Poland, Walasek began his senior career in 1993 with ZKŻ Zielona Góra, and won the Polish Under-21 Championship in 1997. In 2000, he began riding in the UK with Poole Pirates. In 2004, he won the senior Polish individual championship. He was part of the Polish team that won the Speedway World Cup in 2005 and 2007.

Walasek rode in 22 Speedway Grand Prix, reaching one final and scoring a total of 138 points.

For his sporting achievements, Walasek received the Golden Cross of Merit in 2007.

In 2015, Walasek returned to ZKŻ Zielona Góra for a third stint, extended his contract with Rospiggarna in Sweden, and signed to ride for Leicester Lions in the Elite League.

=== World Championships ===
- Speedway Grand Prix
  - 2001 - 16th place (34 points as wild card and reserve)
  - 2002 - 21st place (25 points)
  - 2004 - 23rd place (13 points as wild card)
  - 2009 - 13th place (66 points)
- Speedway World Cup
  - 2002 - 4th place (2 points)
  - 2004 - 4th place (5 points in race-off)
  - 2005 - Winner
  - 2007 - Winner

=== European Championships ===
- Individual European Championship
  - 2006 - Silver medal
- European Pairs Championship
  - 2006 - 1st place (12+2 points in Semi-Final B)
- European Club Champions' Cup
  - 2004 - European Champion (12 points)
  - 2009 - (Poland) Toruń - European Champion (8 pts) Rivne

=== Polish Championships ===
- Individual Polish Championship
- 2004 - Polish Champion
- Individual U-21 Polish Championship
  - 1997 - Polish Champion
- Team Polish Championship (Speedway Ekstraliga)
  - 2003 - Polish Champion
  - 2004 - Bronze medal
  - 2005 - Bronze medal
- Golden Helmet
  - 2004 - Bronze medal
  - 2007 - Gold medal
- Silver Helmet (U-21)
  - 1997 - Bronze medal
- Bronze Helmet (U-19)
  - 1995 - Bronze medal

=== Speedway Grand Prix results ===
2001 Speedway Grand Prix Final Championship standings (Riding No 26)
Race no.	Grand Prix	Pos.	Pts.	Heats	Draw No
2 /6	(United Kingdom) British SGP	8th	10	(2,F,2) +1 +0)	4
3 /6	(Denmark) Danish SGP	14th	6	(3,3) (X,1)	20
4 /6	(Czech Republic) Czech Rep. SGP	6th	14	(3,2) (2,0,2) +1 +2	12
5 /6	(Poland) Polish SGP	18th	4	(0,3,1)	18

2002 Speedway Grand Prix Final Championship standings (Riding No 19)
Race no.	Grand Prix	Pos.	Pts.	Heats	Draw No
1 /10	(Norway) Norwegian SGP	12th	7	(0,3,2) (1,2,0)	19
2 /10	(Poland) Polish SGP	21st	2	(0,1)	12
3 /10	(United Kingdom) British SGP	20th	3	(2,1,0)	20
4 /10	(Slovenia) Slovenian SGP	20th	3	(1,2,0)	18
5 /10	(Sweden) Swedish SGP	16th	5	(3,3) (1,X)	20
6 /10	(Czech Republic) Czech Rep. SGP	15th	5	(3,3) (1,0)	15
7 /10	(Kalmar Union) Scandinavian SGP	injury → (25) Peter Karlsson			15
8 /10	(Europe) European SGP	injury → (25) Peter Karlsson			20
9 /10	(Denmark) Danish SGP	injury → (31) Ronni Pedersen			18
10 /10	(Australia) Australian SGP	injury → (31) Steve Johnston			21

2004 Speedway Grand Prix Final Championship standings (Riding No 23)
Race no.	Grand Prix	Pos.	Pts.	Heats	Draw No
3 /9	(Europe) European SGP	6th	13	(2,0,2) (3,3) +1	23

permanent speedway rider
wild card, track reserve or qualified reserve
rider not classified (track reserve who did not start)

== See also ==
- Poland national speedway team
- List of Speedway Grand Prix riders
