= 2002 Speedway Grand Prix of Poland =

Speedway Grand Prix event

- Venue: Polonia Stadium
- Location: Bydgoszcz, (Poland)
- Start date: 25 May 2002
- Competitors: 24

The 2002 Speedway Grand Prix of Poland was the second round of the 2002 Speedway Grand Prix season (the world championship). It took place on 25 May 2002 at the Polonia Stadium in Bydgoszcz, Poland.

It was the 9th time that a Speedway Grand Prix of Poland had been held.

The Grand Prix was by the Polish rider Tomasz Gollob (his 7th career Grand Prix win and the 4th time that Gollob had won the Polish Grand Prix).

== Grand Prix result ==
Pos.	Rider	1	2	3	4	5	6	SF1	SF2	Final	GP Points
1	(Poland) Tomasz Gollob	3	3	0	3	2		3		3	25
2	(Sweden) Tony Rickardsson	3	3	2					3	2	20
3	(England) Mark Loram	2	3	3	2			2		1	18
4	(Australia) Jason Crump	2	2	3					2	0	16
5	(Australia) Ryan Sullivan	3	2	3				1			13
6	(Australia) Leigh Adams	0	3	1	3				1		13
7	(United States) Billy Hamill	1	3	1	2				0		11
8	(Norway) Rune Holta	3	3	2	2	0	3	0			11
9	(Sweden) Andreas Jonsson	3	0	3	1	3	1				8
10	(Australia) Todd Wiltshire	1	2	0	1						8
11	(Sweden) Mikael Karlsson	0	2	3	0						7
12	(Poland) Piotr Protasiewicz	2	2	1	3	0					7
13	(Poland) Sebastian Ułamek	3	2	0	1						6
14	(England) Andy Smith	0	2	3	0	1					6
15	(England) Scott Nicholls	1	3	2	1	0					5
16	(England) Carl Stonehewer	2	0	0							5
17	(Denmark) Nicki Pedersen	2	1	1							4
18	(United States) Greg Hancock	1	2	1							4
19	(Poland) Krzysztof Cegielski	3	1	0							3
20	(Sweden) Niklas Klingberg	2	0	0							3
21	(Poland) Grzegorz Walasek	0	1								2
22	(Poland) Jarosław Hampel	0	1								2
23	(Czech Republic) Lukáš Dryml	1	0								1
24	(Slovenia) Matej Ferjan	0	0								1

== Heat by heat ==
- Heat 01 66.19 Cegieski, Loram, Nicholls, Hampel
- Heat 02 64.63 Jonsson, Protasiewicz, Hancock, Smith
- Heat 03 64.53 Gollob, Pedersen, Dryml, Ferjan
- Heat 04 65.41 Ulamek, Klingberg, Holta, Walasek
- Heat 05 64.59 Nicholls, Smith, Walasek, Dryml
- Heat 06 63.87 Holta, Hancock, Hampel, Ferjan
- Heat 07 64.93 Gollob, Protasiewicz, Cegielski, Klingberg
- Heat 08 63.75 Loram, Ulamek, Pedersen, Jonsson
- Heat 09 64.03 Rickardsson, Crump, Wiltshire, Adams
- Heat 10 64.31 Sullivan, Stonehewer, Hamill, Karlsson [E/F]
- Heat 11 64.72 Jonsson, Nicholls, Hancock, Cegielski
- Heat 12 65.25 Smith, Holta, Pedersen, Klingberg
- Heat 13 64.41 Rickardsson, Holta, M Karlsson, Gollob
- Heat 14 65.53 Loram, Wiltshire, Nicholls, Stonehewer
- Heat 15 65.32 Hamill, Crump, Protasiewicz, Smith
- Heat 16 65.50 Adams, Sullivan, Jonsson, Ulamek
- Heat 17 66.08 Protasiewicz, Karlsson, Ulamek, Stonehewer
- Heat 18 65.97 Gollob, Jonsson, Smith, Nicholls
- Heat 19 65.72 Sullivan, Rickardsson, Hamill, Wiltshire
- Heat 20 65.98 Crump, Loram, Adams, Holta
- Heat 21 66.09 Holta, Hamill, Jonsson, Protasiewicz
- Heat 22 65.91 Adams, Gollob, Wiltshire, Karlsson [F/Ex]
- Semi Finals
- Heat 23 65.89 Gollob, Loram, Sullivan, Holta
- Heat 24 65.75 Rickardsson, Crump, Adams, Hamill
- Final
- Heat 25 65.42 Gollob, Rickardsson, Loram, Crump
