= 2002 Speedway Grand Prix of Slovenia =

Speedway Grand Prix event

- Venue: Matija Gubec Stadium
- Location: Krško, (Slovenia)
- Start date: 22 June 2002
- Competitors: 24

The 2002 Speedway Grand Prix of Slovenia was the fourth round of the 2002 Speedway Grand Prix season (the world championship). It took place on 22 June 2002 at the Matija Gubec Stadium in Krško, Slovenia.

It was the first time that the Speedway Grand Prix of Slovenia had been held.

The Grand Prix was by the Australian rider Ryan Sullivan (his 2nd successive Grand Prix win and also his 2nd career Grand Prix win).

== Grand Prix result ==
Pos.	Rider	1	2	3	4	5	6	SF1	SF2	Final	GP Points
1	(Australia) Ryan Sullivan	3	3	3				3		3	25
2	(Poland) Tomasz Gollob	1	3	2					2	2	20
3	(England) Mark Loram	0	2	1	3			2		1	18
4	(Sweden) Andreas Jonsson	3	3	2	3				3	0	16
5	(Australia) Leigh Adams	2	2	0	2				1		13
6	(Sweden) Tony Rickardsson	1	1	3	2			1			13
7	(Australia) Jason Crump	2	3	2				t			11
8	(Sweden) Mikael Karlsson	3	3	1	3				0		11
9	(United States) Greg Hancock	2	2	1	3	1					8
10	(Poland) Krzysztof Cegielski	1	3	2	2	0	1				8
11	(United States) Billy Hamill	3	3	0	2	0					7
12	(Czech Republic) Lukáš Dryml	2	1	3	1	2	0				7
13	(Australia) Todd Wiltshire	0	0	1							6
14	(England) Andy Smith	1	2	2	1	1					6
15	(Norway) Rune Holta	3	2	0	ef						5
16	(Denmark) Nicki Pedersen	2	1	3	0	0					5
17	(Poland) Sebastian Ułamek	0	3	1							4
18	(England) Scott Nicholls	2	0	1							4
19	(Sweden) Niklas Klingberg	3	0	0							3
20	(Poland) Grzegorz Walasek	1	2	0							3
21	(Hungary) Sándor Tihanyi	0	1								2
22	(Slovenia) Matej Ferjan	0	1								2
23	(England) Carl Stonehewer	1	ef								1
24	(Slovenia) Izak Šantej	0	0								1

== Heat by heat ==
- Heat 01 Klingberg, Nicholls, Smith, Tihanyi
- Heat 02 Hamill, Hancock, Walasek, Santej
- Heat 03 Jonsson, Pedersen, Cegielski, Ulamek
- Heat 04 Holta, Dryml, Stonehewer, Ferjan
- Heat 05 Cegielski, Smith, Ferjan, Santej
- Heat 06 Ulamek, Walasek, Tihanyi, Stonehewer (EF)
- Heat 07 Jonsson, Hancock, Dryml, Klingberg
- Heat 08 Hamill, Holta, Pedersen, Nicholls (EX)
- Heat 09 Sullivan, Adams, Rickardsson, Loram
- Heat 10 Karlsson, Crump, Gollob, Witshire
- Heat 11 Dryml, Cegielski, Nicholls, Walasek
- Heat 12 Pedersen, Smith, Ulamek, Klingberg
- Heat 13 Sullivan, Jonsson, Smith, Wiltshire
- Heat 14 Crump, Cegielski, Rickardsson, Hamill
- Heat 15 Gollob, Adams, Hancock, Pedersen
- Heat 16 Karlsson, Loram, Dryml, Holta
- Heat 17 Hancock, Hamill, Smith, Holta (EF)
- Heat 18 Rickardsson, Dryml, Wiltshire, Pedersen
- Heat 19 Sullivan, Gollob, Loram, Cegielski
- Heat 20 Jonsson, Crump, Karlsson, Adams
- Heat 21 Loram, Adams, Hancock, Dryml
- Heat 22 Karlsson, Rickardsson, Cegielski, Hamill
- Semi Finals
- Heat 23 Sullivan, Loram, Rickardsson, Crump (T)
- Heat 24 Jonsson, Gollob, Adams, Karlsson
- Final
- Heat 25 Sullivan, Gollob, Loram, Jonsson
