= 2002 Speedway Grand Prix of Sweden =

Speedway Grand Prix event

- Venue: Stockholm Olympic Stadium
- Location: Stockholm, (Sweden)
- Start date: 6 July 2002
- Competitors: 24

The 2002 Speedway Grand Prix of Sweden was the fifth round of the 2002 Speedway Grand Prix season (the world championship). It took place on 6 July 2002 at the Stockholm Olympic Stadium in Stockholm, Sweden.

It was the 8th time that the Speedway Grand Prix of Sweden had been held.

The Grand Prix was by the Swedish rider Tony Rickardsson (his 10th career Grand Prix win).

== Grand Prix result ==
Pos.	Rider	1	2	3	4	5	6	7	SF1	SF2	Final	GP Points
1	(Sweden) Tony Rickardsson	1	3	1	3					2	3	25
2	(Czech Republic) Lukáš Dryml	2	1	3	0	2	2	2	2		2	20
3	(United States) Greg Hancock	3	3	2	2				3		1	18
4	(Australia) Jason Crump	3	2	2						3	0	16
5	(Australia) Leigh Adams	2	2	1	2					1		13
6	(England) Mark Loram	1	2	0	3				1			13
7	(Australia) Ryan Sullivan	2	3	3					0			11
8	(Sweden) Mikael Karlsson	0	3	3						0		11
9	(Poland) Tomasz Gollob	ef	0	3	1							8
10	(Sweden) Peter Karlsson	1	3	3	1	3	f					8
11	(United States) Billy Hamill	3	2	0	2							7
12	(Sweden) Andreas Jonsson	3	3	0	ef							7
13	(Norway) Rune Holta	2	1	3	1	1						6
14	(Poland) Krzysztof Cegielski	3	2	1	t							6
15	(Poland) Grzegorz Walasek	3	3	1	0							5
16	(Sweden) Niklas Klingberg	2	0	2	0	0						5
17	(Poland) Piotr Protasiewicz	1	3	1								4
18	(Denmark) Nicki Pedersen	2	0	1								4
19	(Poland) Sebastian Ułamek	0	2	0								3
20	(Sweden) Freddie Eriksson	0	2	0								3
21	(England) Andy Smith	0	1									2
22	(England) Carl Stonehewer	0	1									2
23	(Australia) Todd Wiltshire	1	t									1
24	(Slovenia) Matej Ferjan	0	0									1

== Heat by heat ==
- Heat 01 Hancock, Holta, Protasiewicz, Eriksson
- Heat 02 Cegielski, Pedersen, P Karlsson, Ulamek
- Heat 03 Hamill, Klingberg, Stonehewer (EX), Smith (EX)
- Heat 04 Walasek, Dryml, Wiltshire, Ferjan
- Heat 05 Protasiewicz, Ulamek, Stonehewer, Ferjan
- Heat 06 P Karlsson, Eriksson, Smith, Wiltshire (T)
- Heat 07 Hancock, Hamill, Dryml, Pedersen
- Heat 08 Walasek, Cegielski, Holta, Klingberg
- Heat 09 Jonsson, Sullivan, Rickardsson, M Karlsson
- Heat 10 Crump, Adams, Loram, Gollob (EF)
- Heat 11 Dryml, Klingberg, Protasiewicz, Eriksson
- Heat 12 Holta, P Karlsson, Pedersen, Ulamek
- Heat 13 Jonsson, Hancock, P Karlsson, Gollob
- Heat 14 Rickardsson, Adams, Walasek, Klingberg
- Heat 15 Sullivan, Loram, Holta, Hamill
- Heat 16 M Karlsson, Crump, Cegielski, Dryml
- Heat 17 P Karlsson, Dryml, Holta, Klingberg
- Heat 18 Gollob, Hamill, Cegielski (T), Walasek (EX)
- Heat 19 Sullivan, Crump, Adams, Jonsson (EX)
- Heat 20 M Karlsson, Hancock, Rickardsson, Loram
- Heat 21 Loram, Adams, P Karlsson (F), Hamill (G)
- Heat 22 Rickardsson, Dryml, Gollob, Jonsson (EF)
- Semi Finals
- Heat 23 Hancock, Dryml, Loram, Sullivan
- Heat 24 Crump, Rickardsson, Adams, M Karlsson (EX)
- Finals
- Heat 25 Rickardsson, Dryml, Hancock, Crump
