= Krzysztof Cegielski =

Polish speedway rider

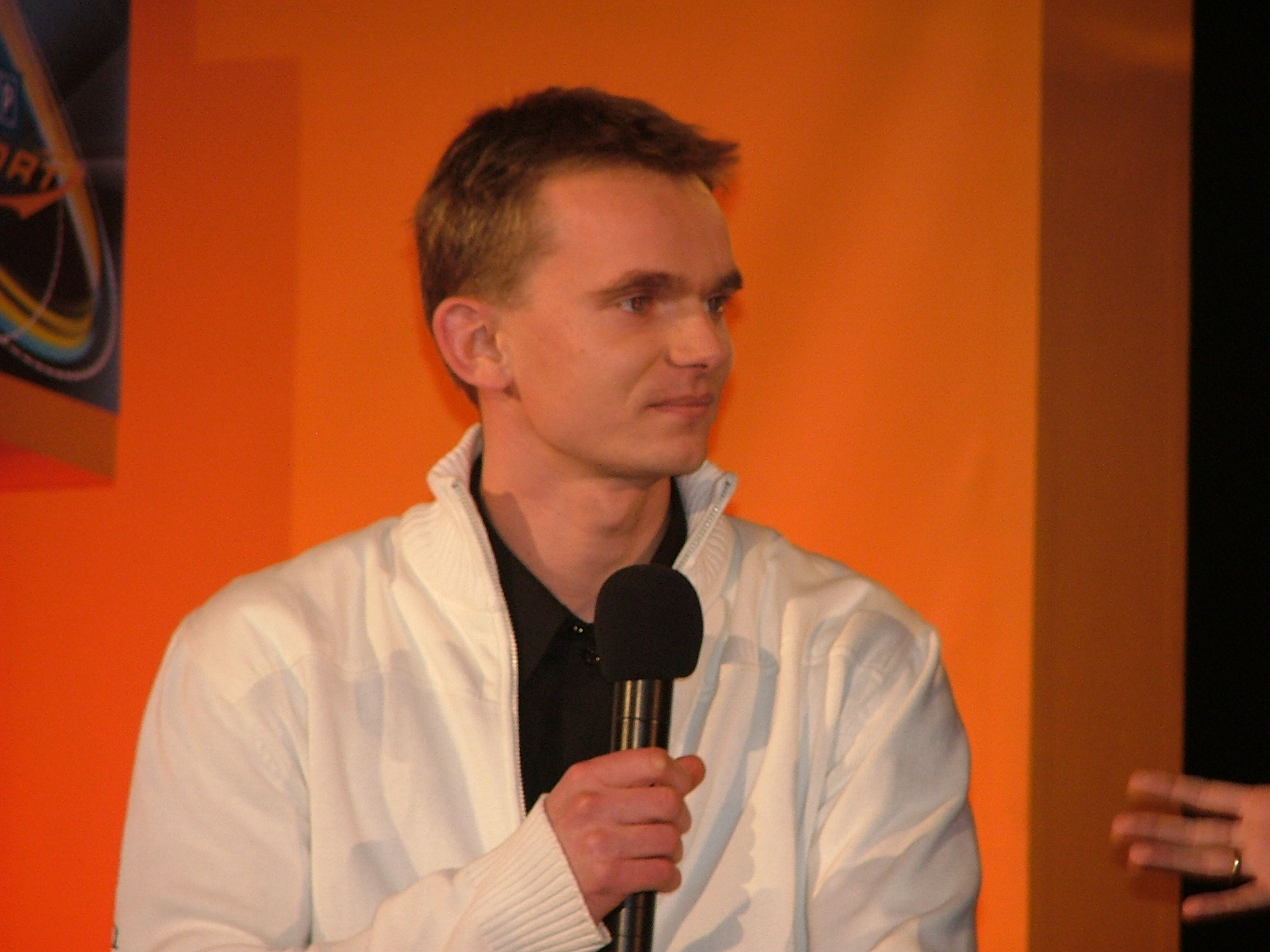
- Born: 3 September 1979 (age 46); Poland
- Nickname: Cegła (Brick)
- Nationality: Polish

Career history

Poland
- 1996-1999: Gorzów
- 2000-2001: Gdańsk
- 2002: Gniezno
- 2003: Wrocław

Great Britain
- 2001: Poole Pirates
- 2002: Eastbourne Eagles

Sweden
- 2002: Vargarna
- 2003: Vetlanda

Krzysztof Cegielski (born 3 September 1979 in Poland) is a former Polish speedway rider who was a permanent Speedway Grand Prix rider in 2002 and 2003 season. He earned five international caps for the Poland speedway team.

== Career ==
Cegielski began racing for Gorzów during the 1996 Polish speedway season. He continued to ride for them before switching to Wybrzeże Gdańsk in 2001.

It was also in 2001 that Cegielski rode for Poole Pirates in the British speedway leagues. The following season in 2002, he moved to Start Gniezno and Eastbourne Eagles respectively.

In 2003, Cegielski was involved in an on-track crash in a Swedish League. The resulting spinal cord injury left him partially paralysed, and ended his racing career. He has remained close to the speedway world, acting as a speedway manager and expert. After over a decade of determined and laborious rehabilitation, he managed to get back on his feet, and is now able to walk short distances.

== World Championship results ==
=== Speedway Grand Prix results ===
2001 Speedway Grand Prix Final Championship standings (Riding No 23)
Race no.	Grand Prix	Pos.	Pts.	Heats	Draw No
5 /6	(Poland) Polish SGP	16	5	(2,2) (0,0)	23

2002 Speedway Grand Prix Final Championship standings (Riding No 22)
Race no.	Grand Prix	Pos.	Pts.	Heats	Draw No
1 /10	(Norway) Norwegian SGP	18	4	(1,3,1)	22
2 /10	(Poland) Polish SGP	20	3	(3,1,0)	16
3 /10	(United Kingdom) British SGP	24	1	(1,X)	19
4 /10	(Slovenia) Slovenian SGP	10	8	(1,3,2) (2,0,1)	22
5 /10	(Sweden) Swedish SGP	14	6	(3,2) (1,T)	10
6 /10	(Czech Republic) Czech Rep. SGP	10	8	(3,2) (1,3,1)	13
7 /10	(Sweden) Scandinavian SGP	10	8	(3,3) (1,3,1)	10
8 /10	(Europe) European SGP	6	13	(3,1,3) (3,0,3) +1	10
9 /10	(Denmark) Danish SGP	injury → (26) Piotr Protasiewicz			6
10 /10	(Australia) Australian SGP	19	4	(2,1,1)	16

2003 Speedway Grand Prix Final Championship standings (Riding No 16)
Race no.	Grand Prix	Pos.	Pts.	Heats	Draw No
1 /9	(Europe) European SGP	10	8	(1,2,3) (3,1,1)	16
2 /9	(Sweden) Swedish SGP	11	7	(3,3) (0,2,0)	10
3 /9	(United Kingdom) British SGP	injury → (26) Peter Karlsson			11
4 /9	(Denmark) Danish SGP	injury → (26) Peter Karlsson			14
5 /9	(Slovenia) Slovenian SGP	injury → (26) Peter Karlsson			17
6 /9	(Kalmar Union) Scandinavian SGP	injury → (34) Joonas Kylmäkorpi			19
7 /9	(Czech Republic) Czech Rep. SGP	injury → (26) Peter Karlsson			21
8 /9	(Poland) Polish SGP	injury → (26) Peter Karlsson			
9 /9	(Norway) Norwegian SGP	injury → (26) Peter Karlsson			

permanent speedway rider
wild card, track reserve or qualified reserve
rider not classified (track reserve who did not start)

=== Individual World Championship (Speedway Grand Prix) ===
- 2001 - 30th place (5 points)
- 2002 - 16th place (55 points)
- 2003 - 24th place (16 points)

=== Individual U-21 World Championship ===
- 1997 - Lost in National Qualification - Semi-Final
- 1998 - Lost in National Qualification - Semi-Final
- 1999 - Lost in National Qualification - Final
- 2000 - 2nd place (11 points +3)

=== Team World Championship (Speedway World Cup) ===
- 2001 - 2nd place (11 points)
- 2002 - 4th place (9 points)

=== Other results ===
Individual European Championship

- 2001 - 3rd place (12 points)

Individual U-19 European Championship

- 1998 - 4th place (12 points +2)

Individual Polish Championship

- 2001 - 4th place (11 points)
- 2002 - 2nd place (10 points)

Individual U-21 Polish Championship

- 1998 - 9th place (9 points)
- 1999 - 2nd place (13 points +F)
- 2000 - 5th place (11 points)

Polish Pairs Championship

- 1998 - Polish Champion
- 2000 - 2nd place

Polish U-21 Pairs Championship

- 1999 - 2nd place
- 2000 - 2nd place

Team U-21 Polish Championship

- 1999 - Polish Champion with Stal Gorzów in Piła

Golden Helmet

- 2001 - 7th place (7 points)

Silver Helmet

- 1998 - 2nd place (13 points)
- 1999 - 9th place (7 points)
- 2000 - 8th place (7 points)

Bronze Helmet

- 1997 - 5th place (9 points)
- 1998 - 2nd place (13 points)

== See also ==
- List of Speedway Grand Prix riders
- Poland speedway team
