= 2002 Speedway Grand Prix of Czech Republic =

Speedway Grand Prix event

- Venue: Markéta Stadium
- Location: Prague, (Czech Republic)
- Start date: 20 July 2002
- Competitors: 24

The 2002 Speedway Grand Prix of Czech Republic was the sixth round of the 2002 Speedway Grand Prix season (the world championship). It took place on 20 July 2002 at the Markéta Stadium in Prague, Czech Republic.

It was the 6th time that the Speedway Grand Prix of Czech Republic had been held.

The Grand Prix was by Australian rider Jason Crump (his 6th career Grand Prix win).

== Grand Prix result ==
Pos.	Rider	1	2	3	4	5	6	SF1	SF2	Final	GP Points
1	(Australia) Jason Crump	3	3	3				2		3	25
2	(United States) Greg Hancock	1	2	2				3		2	20
3	(Australia) Ryan Sullivan	3	3	3					3	1	18
4	(Sweden) Tony Rickardsson	2	3	1	2				2	0	16
5	(England) Mark Loram	2	2	0	3				1		13
6	(United States) Billy Hamill	2	3	1	2	2		1			13
7	(Australia) Leigh Adams	0	2	2					0		11
8	(Czech Republic) Lukáš Dryml	0	0	2	3			0			11
9	(Poland) Tomasz Gollob	2	1	2	2	0	1				8
10	(Poland) Krzysztof Cegielski	3	2	1	3	1					8
11	(Norway) Rune Holta	2	1	3	0	3	0				7
12	(Sweden) Mikael Karlsson	1	3	1	f						7
13	(Denmark) Nicki Pedersen	3	2	0	1						6
14	(Slovenia) Matej Ferjan	0	2	2	0	1					6
15	(Sweden) Andreas Jonsson	3	0	3	1	0					5
16	(Poland) Grzegorz Walasek	3	3	1	0						5
17	(England) Scott Nicholls	1	2	1							4
18	(England) Carl Stonehewer	1	3	1							4
19	(Poland) Sebastian Ułamek	1	3	0							3
20	(Sweden) Niklas Klingberg	2	f	0							3
21	(England) Andy Smith	0	1								2
22	(Australia) Todd Wiltshire	1	1								2
23	(Czech Republic) Bohumil Brhel	0	0								1
24	(Czech Republic) Aleš Dryml Jr.	0	0								1

== Heat by heat ==
- Heat 01 Pedersen, Gollob, Nicholls, A Dryml
- Heat 02 Walasek, Hamill, Ulamek, Brhel
- Heat 03 Jonsson, Klingberg, Stonehewer, Ferjan
- Heat 04 Cegielski, Holta, Wiltshire, Smith
- Heat 05 Stonehewer, Nicholls, Smith, Brhel
- Heat 06 Ulamek, Ferjan, Wiltshire, A Dryml
- Heat 07 Hamill, Pedersen, Holta, Jonsson
- Heat 08 Walasek, Cegielski, Gollob, Klingberg (F)
- Heat 09 Crump, Rickardsson, Karlsson, Adams
- Heat 10 Sullivan, Loram, Hancock, L Dryml
- Heat 11 Holta, Ferjan, Stonehewer, Klingberg
- Heat 12 Jonsson, Gollob, Nicholls, Ulamek
- Heat 13 Crump, Gollob, Hamill, L Dryml
- Heat 14 Karlsson, Loram, Walasek, Ferjan
- Heat 15 Rickardsson, Hancock, Jonsson, Pedersen
- Heat 16 Sullivan, Adams, Cegielski, Holta
- Heat 17 Holta, Hamill, Ferjan, Jonsson
- Heat 18 Cegielski, L Dryml, Pedersen, Walasek
- Heat 19 Crump, Adams, Rickardsson, Loram
- Heat 20 Sullivan, Hancock, Karlsson, Gollob
- Heat 21 L Dryml, Rickardsson, Gollob, Holta
- Heat 22 Loram, Hamill, Cegielski, Karlsson (F)
- Heat 23 Hancock, Crump, Hamill, L Dryml
- Heat 24 Sullivan, Rickardsson, Loram, Adams
- Heat 25 Crump, Hancock, Sullivan, Rickardsson
