= 2002 Speedway Grand Prix of Norway =

Speedway Grand Prix event

- Venue: Vikingskipet
- Location: Hamar, (Norway)
- Start date: 11 May 2002
- Competitors: 24

The 2002 Speedway Grand Prix of Norway was the first round of the 2002 Speedway Grand Prix season (the world championship). It took place on 11 May 2002 at the Vikingskipet in Hamar, Norway.

It was the first time that the Speedway Grand Prix of Norway had been held.

The Grand Prix was by the Swedish rider Tony Rickardsson (his 9th career Grand Prix win).

== Grand Prix result ==
Pos.	Rider	1	2	3	4	5	6	SF1	SF2	Final	GP Points
1	(Sweden) Tony Rickardsson	3	3					3		3	25
2	(Australia) Ryan Sullivan	1	3	3					2	2	20
3	(Sweden) Mikael Karlsson	2	2	1	3			2		1	18
4	(Australia) Jason Crump	ef	2	0	2				3	0	16
5	(Australia) Leigh Adams	2	3	2					1		13
6	(England) Carl Stonehewer	1	2	3	2	0	2	1			13
7	(United States) Billy Hamill	3	3	2				0			11
8	(Australia) Todd Wiltshire	0	2	3	3				0		11
9	(United States) Greg Hancock	3	3	0	2	1					8
10	(England) Mark Loram	3	2	2	1	1					8
11	(Poland) Tomasz Gollob	1	1	3	0						7
12	(Poland) Grzegorz Walasek	0	3	2	1	2	0				7
13	(Norway) Lars Gunnestad	3	2	0	1						6
14	(Finland) Kai Laukkanen	1	2	3	0	1					6
15	(Czech Republic) Lukáš Dryml	2	3	1	0						5
16	(Sweden) Niklas Klingberg	2	1	2	0	0					5
17	(Poland) Krzysztof Cegielski	1	3	1							4
18	(England) Andy Smith	2	1	0							4
19	(Sweden) Andreas Jonsson	3	0	0							3
20	(England) Scott Nicholls	2	0	t							3
21	(Poland) Sebastian Ułamek	0	1								2
22	(Denmark) Nicki Pedersen	1	1								2
23	(Slovenia) Matej Ferjan	0	0								1
24	(Norway) Rune Holta	0	0								1

== Heat by heat ==
- Heat 01 Loram, Smith, Laukkanen, Holta
- Heat 02 Gunnestad, Klingberg, Stonehewer, Ferjan
- Heat 03 Hancock, Dryml, Cegielski, Walasek
- Heat 04 Jonsson, Nicholls, Pedersen, Ulamek
- Heat 05 Cegielski, Laukkanen, Ulamek, Ferjan
- Heat 06 Walasek, Stonehewer, Pedersen, Holta
- Heat 07 Hancock, Loram, Klingberg, Nicholls
- Heat 08 Dryml, Gunnestad, Smith, Jonsson (EX)
- Heat 09 Rickardsson, Adams, Sullivan, Wiltshire
- Heat 10 Hamill, Karlsson, Gollob, Crump (EF)
- Heat 11 Stonehewer, Klingberg, Cegielski, Jonsson
- Heat 12 Laukkanen, Walasek, Smith (F), Nicholls (T)
- Heat 13 Rickardsson, Crump, Walasek, Hancock
- Heat 14 Sullivan, Karlsson, Dryml, Klingberg
- Heat 15 Adams, Loram, Gollob, Laukkanen
- Heat 16 Hamill, Stonehewer, Wiltshire, Gunnestad
- Heat 17 Gollob, Walasek, Gunnestad, Klingberg
- Heat 18 Wiltshire, Hancock, Laukkanen, Dryml (F)
- Heat 19 Rickardsson, Adams, Karlsson, Stonehewer
- Heat 20 Sullivan, Hamill, Loram, Crump
- Heat 21 Karlsson, Crump, Hancock, Gollob
- Heat 22 Wiltshire, Stonehewer, Loram, Walasek
- Semi Finals
- Heat 23 Rickardsson, Karlsson, Stonehewer, Hamill (EX)
- Heat 24 Crump, Sullivan, Adams, Wiltshire
- Final
- Heat 25 Rickardsson, Sullivan, Karlsson, Crump (EX)
