= 2002 Speedway Grand Prix of Great Britain =

Speedway Grand Prix event

- Venue: Millennium Stadium
- Location: Cardiff, (Wales)
- Start date: 8 June 2002
- Competitors: 24

The 2002 Speedway Grand Prix of Great Britain was the third round of the 2002 Speedway Grand Prix season (the world championship). It took place on 8 June 2002 at the Millennium Stadium in Cardiff, Wales.

It was the 8th time that the Speedway Grand Prix of Great Britain had been held.

The Grand Prix was by the Australian rider Ryan Sullivan (his maiden career Grand Prix win).

== Grand Prix result ==
Pos.	Rider	1	2	3	4	5	6	SF1	SF2	Final	GP Points
1	(Australia) Ryan Sullivan	3	3	2					2	3	25
2	(Australia) Todd Wiltshire	3	3	2	1	3			3	2	20
3	(Sweden) Mikael Karlsson	3	2	3	3			2		1	18
4	(Australia) Leigh Adams	0	1	2	2			3		0	16
5	(Sweden) Tony Rickardsson	3	3	3					1		13
6	(England) Lee Richardson	2	0	3	2	1	3	1			13
7	(Australia) Jason Crump	1	3	2				0			11
8	(Poland) Tomasz Gollob	2	2	0	2				0		11
9	(England) Scott Nicholls	2	2	1	2	1					8
10	(England) Mark Loram	2	2	0	1						8
11	(United States) Billy Hamill	1	1	3	0						7
12	(Sweden) Andreas Jonsson	3	2	1	3	0					7
13	(Czech Republic) Lukáš Dryml	3	1	3	0	1					6
14	(England) Joe Screen	1	2	2	0	1					6
15	(Norway) Rune Holta	0	0	0							5
16	(Poland) Sebastian Ułamek	1	3	2	0	0					5
17	(United States) Greg Hancock	1	3	1							4
18	(England) Andy Smith	0	2	1							4
19	(Sweden) Niklas Klingberg	2	0	0							3
20	(Poland) Grzegorz Walasek	2	1	0							3
21	(England) Carl Stonehewer	0	1								2
22	(Denmark) Nicki Pedersen	0	1								2
23	(Poland) Krzysztof Cegielski	1	0								1
24	(Slovenia) Matej Ferjan	0	0								1

== Heat by heat ==
- Heat 01 Wiltshire, Richardson, Hancock, Pedersen
- Heat 02 Jonsson, Klingberg, Screen, Stonehewer
- Heat 03 Karlsson, Nicholls, Cegielski, Ferjan
- Heat 04 Dryml, Walasek, Ulamek, Smith
- Heat 05 Hancock, Smith, Stonehewer, Cegielski (EX)
- Heat 06 Ulamek, Screen, Pedersen, Ferjan
- Heat 07 Wiltshire, Karlsson, Walasek, Klingberg
- Heat 08 Jonsson, Nicholls, Dryml, Richardson
- Heat 09 Sullivan, Gollob, Crump, Holta
- Heat 10 Rickardsson, Loram, Hamill, Adams
- Heat 11 Richardson, Screen, Hancock, Walasek
- Heat 12 Dryml, Ulamek, Smith, Klingberg
- Heat 13 Sullivan, Wiltshire, Adams, Ulamek (EX)
- Heat 14 Crump, Loram, Jonsson, Screen
- Heat 15 Karlsson, Gollob, Hamill, Dryml (R)
- Heat 16 Rickardsson, Richardson, Nicholls, Holta (EX)
- Heat 17 Hamill, Adams, Screen, Holta (R)
- Heat 18 Jonsson, Nicholls, Dryml, Ulamek
- Heat 19 Karlsson, Sullivan, Richardson, Loram
- Heat 20 Rickardsson, Crump, Wiltshire, Gollob
- Heat 21 Richardson, Gollob, Nicholls, Hamill
- Heat 22 Wiltshire, Adams, Loram, Jonsson (EX)
- Semi Finals
- Heat 23 Adams, Karlsson, Richardson, Crump
- Heat 24 Wiltshire, Sullivan, Rickardsson, Gollob
- Final
- Heat 25 Sullivan, Wiltshire, Karlsson, Adams
