= 1997 Speedway World Team Cup =

38th edition of the annual motorcycle speedway World Cup competition

Seasons
- ← 1996 1998 →

The 1997 Speedway World Team Cup was the 38th edition of the FIM Speedway World Team Cup to determine the team world champions.

The final was held at the Stadion Żużlowy Centrum in Piła, Poland on 13 September. Denmark won their 11th title and Hans Nielsen won his 11th and final gold medal. Remarkably Nielsen had won his gold medals in a near twenty-year span from 1978 until 1997, cementing his place in history as arguably the best speedway rider of all time.

== First round ==
- 21 June 1997
- (Slovenia) Matija Gubec Stadium, Krško
- Belarus and the Netherlands withdrew

First	Second	Third	Fourth	Fifth
Slovenia 38; Matej Ferjan 17; Izak Šantej 14; Gerhard Lekse 7	Italy 29; Andrea Maida 16; Alessandro Dalla Valle 8 Simone Tadiello 5	Austria 24; Toni Pilotto 12; Helmut Lercher 7 Andreas Bössner 5	Croatia 16; Zlatko Krznaric 8 Krunoslav Zganec 6 Zeljko Feher 2	France 11; Christophe Dubernard 7 Jerome Georges 2 Stephane Tresarrieu 2

- Slovenia and Italy to second round

== Second round ==
- 23 August 1997
- (Hungary) Gázvezeték Street Sports Complex, Debrecen

Placing	Pair / Rider Name	Total	1	2	3	4	5	6	7	8	9	10	11	12	13	14	15	16	17	18	19	20	21	22
1	Czech Republic	27							10							20							27
1	(3) Tomas Topinka	11	2				2				2			3				0			2
1	(4) Antonín Kasper Jr.	16	3				3				3			2				2			3
1	(16) Václav Milík Sr.	0
2	Hungary	25							8							18							25
2	(11) Zoltán Adorján	10			3				3				2		-			1					1
2	(12) Laszlo Bodi	5			1				1				-		3			-					-
2	(20) Sándor Tihanyi	10											3		2			3					2
3	Slovenia	19							9							12							19
3	(7) Matej Ferjan	14		3				3			0					2				3			3
3	(8) Izak Šantej	5		2				1			1					0				1			0
3	(18) Gerhard Lekse	0
4	Norway	15							4							9							15
4	(9) Kenneth Borgenhaug	6			2			0				1		0			1					2
4	(10) Tryggve Jensen	9			0			2				3		1			3					0
4	(19) -	0
5	Ukraine	15							5							11							15
5	(13) Vladimir Kolody	5				0			0			2				3			E		0
5	(14) Igor Marko	10				3			2			0				1			3		1
5	(21) Aleksandr Lyatosinsky	0
6	Italy	14							4							10							14
6	(1) Andrea Maida	10	1			2				3			E				2			2
6	(2) Alesandro Dalla Valle	4	E			1				2			1				0			0
6	(15) Alessandro Milanese	0
7	Latvia	11							2							4							11
7	(5) Nikolay Kokin	7		1			1			1					E				1			3
7	(6) Aleksandr Biznya	4		E			0			0					1				2			1
7	(17) -	0
Placing	Pair / Rider Name	Total	1	2	3	4	5	6	7	8	9	10	11	12	13	14	15	16	17	18	19	20	21	22

m - exclusion for exceeding two minute time allowance • t - exclusion for touching the tapes • x - other exclusion • e - retired or mechanical failure • f - fell
ns - non-starter • nc - non-classify

gate A - inside	gate B	gate C	gate D - outside

- Czech Republic and Hungary to World final

== World Final ==
- 13 September 1997
- (Poland) Stadion Żużlowy Centrum, Piła

Placing	Pair / Rider Name	Total	1	2	3	4	5	6	7	8	9	10	11	12	13	14	15	16	17	18	19	20	21	22
1	Denmark	27							9							19							27
1	(1) Hans Nielsen	14	3			3				2			2				2			2
1	(2) Tommy Knudsen	13	1			2				3			3				1			3
1	(15) Jesper B. Jensen	0
2	Poland	25							7							15							25
2	(3) Tomasz Gollob	13	2				2				2			2				2			3
2	(4) Jacek Krzyzaniak	0	0				-				-			-				-			-
2	(16) Piotr Protasiewicz	12					3				3			1				3			2
3	Sweden	21							6							13							21
3	(9) Tony Rickardsson	17			2			3				3		3			3					3
3	(10) Jimmy Nilsen	3			1			0				-		-			-					2
3	(19) Peter Karlsson	1										1		E			0
4	Germany	17							8							14							17
4	(7) Robert Barth	9		3				1			E					3				E			2
4	(8) Robbie Kessler	8		2				2			1					2				1			E
4	(18) Gerd Riss	0
5	Czech Republic	16							6							12							16
5	(11) Tomas Topinka	10			3				3				1		2			1					F
5	(12) Antonín Kasper Jr.	6			0				-				0		3			0					3
5	(20) Václav Milík Sr.	0
6	Russia	10							4							7							10
6	(13) Roman Povazhny	7				F			1			2				1			2		1
6	(14) Rinat Mardanshin	3				1			2			0				0			-		-
6	(21) Sergey Yeroshin	0																	X		0
7	Hungary	9							2							4							9
7	(5) Zoltán Adorján	3		0			0			-					-				3			0
7	(6) Sándor Tihanyi	6		1			1			1					1				1			1
7	(17) Laszlo Bodi	0								0					0
Placing	Pair / Rider Name	Total	1	2	3	4	5	6	7	8	9	10	11	12	13	14	15	16	17	18	19	20	21	22

m - exclusion for exceeding two minute time allowance • t - exclusion for touching the tapes • x - other exclusion • e - retired or mechanical failure • f - fell
ns - non-starter • nc - non-classify

gate A - inside	gate B	gate C	gate D - outside

== See also ==
- 1997 Speedway Grand Prix
