= 2002 Speedway Grand Prix of Scandinavia =

Speedway Grand Prix event

- Venue: Ullevi
- Location: Gothenburg, (Sweden)
- Start date: 31 August 2002
- Competitors: 24

The 2002 Speedway Grand Prix of Scandinavia was the seventh round of the 2002 Speedway Grand Prix season (the world championship). It took place on 31 August 2002 at the Ullevi in Gothenburg, Sweden.

It was the first time that the Speedway Grand Prix of Scandinavia had been held.

The Grand Prix was by the Australian rider Leigh Adams (his maiden career Grand Prix win).

== Grand Prix result ==
Pos.	Rider	1	2	3	4	5	6	SF1	SF2	Final	GP Points
1	(Australia) Leigh Adams	1	2	2				2		3	25
2	(Sweden) Tony Rickardsson	3	3	3				3		2	20
3	(Czech Republic) Lukáš Dryml	0	2	2					3	1	18
4	(United States) Greg Hancock	3	3	3					2	0	16
5	(Sweden) Mikael Karlsson	2	1	3	0	2	3	1			13
6	(Australia) Jason Crump	1	2	1	2				1		13
7	(Australia) Ryan Sullivan	2	3	1	3				0		11
8	(Norway) Rune Holta	2	3	1	2	2	2	0			11
9	(Denmark) Nicki Pedersen	3	2	0	3	1					8
10	(Poland) Krzysztof Cegielski	3	3	1	3	1					8
11	(England) Scott Nicholls	3	2	3	0	0					7
12	(Australia) Todd Wiltshire	1	3	3	3	ef	0				7
13	(United States) Billy Hamill	2	1	1							6
14	(England) Mark Loram	0	0	1							6
15	(Sweden) Peter Karlsson	2	1	2	0	0					5
16	(Poland) Tomasz Gollob	1	3	3	1	0					5
17	(Sweden) Andreas Jonsson	2	0	1							4
18	(Sweden) Niklas Klingberg	3	0	1							4
19	(England) Carl Stonehewer	0	2	f							3
20	(Denmark) Bjarne Pedersen	1	2	0							3
21	(Poland) Sebastian Ułamek	0	1								2
22	(Sweden) David Ruud	0	1								2
23	(Slovenia) Matej Ferjan	0	0								1
24	(England) Andy Smith	1	0								1

== Heat by heat ==
- Heat 01 Nicholls, Jonsson, Gollob, Ruud
- Heat 02 Cegielski, P Karlsson, B Pedersen, Stonehewer
- Heat 03 Klingberg, M Karlsson, Smith, Ferjan
- Heat 04 N Pedersen, Holta, Wiltshire, Ulamek
- Heat 05 Gollob, Stonehewer, Ulamek, Smith
- Heat 06 Wiltshire, B Pedersen, Ruud, Ferjan
- Heat 07 Holta, Nicholls, P Karlsson, Klingberg
- Heat 08 Cegielski, N Pedersen, M Karlsson, Jonsson
- Heat 09 Rickardsson, Hamill, Crump, Dryml
- Heat 10 Hancock, Sullivan, Adams, Loram
- Heat 11 Gollob, P Karlsson, Jonsson, B Pedersen
- Heat 12 M Karlsson, Wiltshire, Klingberg, Stonehewer (F)
- Heat 13 Rickardsson, Wiltshire, Holta, Loram
- Heat 14 Sullivan, Crump, Cegielski, P Karlsson
- Heat 15 Nicholls, Adams, Hamill, M Karlsson
- Heat 16 Hancock, Dryml, Gollob, N Pedersen
- Heat 17 N Pedersen, Holta, Hamill, P Karlsson
- Heat 18 Cegielski, M Karlsson, Loram, Gollob
- Heat 19 Rickardsson, Dryml, Crump, Nicholls
- Heat 20 Hancock, Adams, Sullivan, Wiltshire (E)
- Heat 21 M Karlsson, Crump, N Pedersen, Wiltshire
- Heat 22 Sullivan, Holta, Cegielski, Nicholls
- Semi Finals
- Heat 23 Rickardsson, Adams, M Karlsson, Holta
- Heat 24 Dryml, Hancock, Crump, Sullivan
- Finals
- Heat 25 Adams, Rickardsson, Dryml, Hancock
