= 2002 Speedway Grand Prix of Europe =

Speedway Grand Prix event

- Venue: Stadion Śląski
- Location: Chorzów, (Poland)
- Start date: 14 September 2002
- Competitors: 24

The 2002 Speedway Grand Prix of Europe was the eighth round of the 2002 Speedway Grand Prix season (the world championship). It took place on 14 September 2002 at the Stadion Śląski in Chorzów, Poland.

It was the second time that the Speedway Grand Prix of Europe had been held.

The Grand Prix was by the Danish rider Nicki Pedersen (his maiden career Grand Prix win).

== Grand Prix result ==
Pos.	Rider	1	2	3	4	5	6	SF1	SF2	Final	GP Points
1	(Denmark) Nicki Pedersen	2	3	2	2				2	3	25
2	(Australia) Jason Crump	3	3	1	3			2		2	20
3	(Sweden) Mikael Karlsson	1	2	3					3	1	18
4	(Sweden) Tony Rickardsson	3	2	3				3		0	16
5	(England) Scott Nicholls	1	2	2	3	2		1			13
6	(Poland) Krzysztof Cegielski	3	1	3	3	0	3		1		13
7	(Australia) Ryan Sullivan	2	0	3	2				0		11
8	(Australia) Leigh Adams	1	1	3	2			0			11
9	(United States) Billy Hamill	2	3	1	2	1					8
10	(Czech Republic) Lukáš Dryml	0	2	0	1						8
11	(Norway) Rune Holta	0	3	0	0						7
12	(England) Mark Loram	2	2	1	2	1					7
13	(United States) Greg Hancock	2	1	1							6
14	(Sweden) Niklas Klingberg	3	0	2	0	1					6
15	(Poland) Tomasz Gollob	2	2	0	0						5
16	(Poland) Sebastian Ułamek	3	1	3	0	0					5
17	(Poland) Jarosław Hampel	0	3	1							4
18	(England) Lee Richardson	1	2								4
19	(Sweden) Andreas Jonsson	0	3	0							3
20	(Sweden) Peter Karlsson	3	0	0							3
21	(Australia) Todd Wiltshire	0	1								2
22	(England) Andy Smith	0	1								2
23	(Slovenia) Matej Ferjan	1	0								1
24	(Poland) Piotr Protasiewicz	1	0								1

== Heat by heat ==
- Heat 1 Klingberg, Pedersen, Richardson, Jonsson
- Heat 2 Cegielski, Gollob, Protasiewicz, Hampel
- Heat 3 Ulamek, Loram, Ferjan, Wiltshire
- Heat 4 P Karlsson, Hamill, Nicholls, Smith
- Heat 5 Hampel, Richardson, Smith, Ferjan
- Heat 6 Jonsson, Nicholls, Wiltshire, Protasiewicz
- Heat 7 Hamill, Gollob, Ulamek, Klingberg
- Heat 8 Pedersen, Loram, Cegielski, P Karlsson (EF)
- Heat 9 Crump, Hancock, Adams, Holta
- Heat 10 Rickardsson, Sullivan, M Karlsson, Dryml
- Heat 11 Ulamek, Nicholls, Hampel, P Karlsson
- Heat 12 Cegielski, Klingberg, Richardson (FX), Jonsson (FX)
- Heat 13 Crump, Dryml, Hamill, Klingberg
- Heat 14 Nicholls, Pedersen, Adams, Sullivan
- Heat 15 Cegielski, M Karlsson, Hancock, Gollob (EF)
- Heat 16 Holta, Rickardsson, Loram, Ulamek
- Heat 17 Sullivan, Hamill, Hancock, Ulamek
- Heat 18 Adams, Loram, Klingberg, Gollob (FR)
- Heat 19 Rickardsson, Pedersen, Crump, Cegielski
- Heat 20 M Karlsson, Nicholls, Holta (FX)], Dryml (FX)
- Heat 21 Crump, Sullivan, Dryml, Loram
- Heat 22 Cegielski, Adams, Hamill, Holta
- Semi Finals
- Heat 23 Rickardsson, Crump, Nicholls, Adams
- Heat 24 M Karlsson, Pedersen, Cegielski, Sullivan (FX)
- Finals
- Heat 25 Pedersen, Crump, M Karlsson, Rickardsson
