= 2004 Individual Speedway European Championship =

Motorcycle racing competition

Seasons
- ← 2003 2005 →

The 2004 Individual Speedway European Championship

== Qualification ==
- Qualifying Round:
  - June 13, 2004
  - (Czech Republic) Mseno
- Semi-Final A:
  - June 27, 2004
  - (Slovenia) Lendava
- Semi-Final B:
  - July 3, 2004
  - (Germany) Stralsund
- Scandinavian Final (Semi-Final C):
  - May 23, 2004
  - (Norway) Elgane

== Final ==
- September 29, 2004
- (Denmark) Holsted

Placing	Rider	Total	1	2	3	4	5	6	7	8	9	10	11	12	13	14	15	16	17	18	19	20	Pts	Pos	21
1	(Slovenia) (10) Matej Žagar	14			3			3						2			3		3				14	1	3
2	(Slovenia) (4) Matej Ferjan	14	3							3				3				2				3	14	2	2
3	(Denmark) (6) Hans N. Andersen	12		2				1			3							3			3		12	3	
4	(Denmark) (14) Niels Kristian Iversen	11				3		2					2		2							2	11	4	
5	(Poland) (13) Jacek Krzyżaniak	10				1	3							1		3					2		10	5	
6	(Poland) (3) Krzysztof Jabłoński	9	2						2				3				1				1		9	6	
7	(Russia) (16) Renat Gafurov	8				2				X	1						2			3			8	7	
8	(Poland) (11) Janusz Kołodziej	7			2				3		2					X						-	7	8	
9	(Sweden) (7) Niklas Klingberg	6		3					E					0	3					0			6	9	
10	(Sweden) (2) Freddie Eriksson	6	1					0				1				2				2			6	10	
11	(Sweden) (8) David Ruud	6		0						2			1			1			2				6	11	
12	(Poland) (12) Andrzej Huszcza	5			1					E		3			1						0		5	12	
13	(Denmark) (15) Morten Risager	4				0			1			2						1	0				4	13	
14	(Slovenia) (1) Izak Šantej	3	0				2				0				0				1				3	14	
15	(Czech Republic) (9) Richard Wolff	2			0		1						0					0		1			2	15	
16	(Germany) (5) Joachim Kugelmann	1		1			X					0					0					-	1	16	
R1	(Poland) (R1) Marcin Rempała	1																				1	1	R1	
	(R2) None	0																					0		
Placing	Rider	Total	1	2	3	4	5	6	7	8	9	10	11	12	13	14	15	16	17	18	19	20	Pts	Pos	21

m - exclusion for exceeding two minute time allowance • t - exclusion for touching the tapes • x - other exclusion • e - retired or mechanical failure • f - fell • ns - non-starter • nc - non-classify

gate A - inside	gate B	gate C	gate D - outside
