= Stadion Polonii =

Stadion Polonii may refer to:

- Stadion Polonii Bydgoszcz, a multi-purpose stadium in Bydgoszcz, Poland
- Stadion Polonii Warszawa, a multi-purpose stadium in Warsaw, Poland
- Stadion Polonii Piła, a speedway stadium in Piła, Poland
