= Jernej Kolenko =

Slovenian speedway rider

- Born: November 30, 1982 (age 43)
- Nationality: Slovenian

Career history

Poland
- 2001: Lublin
- 2006-2008: Rawicz

Great Britain
- 2002: King's Lynn Stars
- 2003: Oxford Silver Machine
- 2005: Exeter Falcons

Denmark
- 2007: Holstebro
- 2008: Slangerup

Individual honours
- 2005, 2007: Slovenian national runner-up

Jernej Kolenko (born November 30 1982) is a former Slovenian motorcycle speedway rider who rode in Speedway World Cup.

== Career ==
Kolenko medalled six times at the Slovenian Individual Speedway Championship. Although he won two silver medals and four bronze medals he never became champion of Slovenia, being denied the gold medal twice by Matej Žagar.

Kolenko represented Slovenia in the 2002 Speedway World Cup.

Kolenko signed for King's Lynn Stars for the 2002 Elite League speedway season and reached the final of the 2002 Speedway Under-21 World Championship. The following year, he joined Oxford Silver Machine for the 2003 Elite League speedway season. He returned to British speedway in 2005 after joining the Exeter Falcons.

== Speedway Grand Prix results ==
2006 Speedway Grand Prix Final Championship standings (Riding No 18)
Race no.	Grand Prix	Pos.	Pts.	Heats	Draw No
1 /10	(Slovenia) Slovenian SGP	18			18

2007 Speedway Grand Prix Final Championship standings (Riding No 17)
Race no.	Grand Prix	Pos.	Pts.	Heats	Draw No
10 /11	(Slovenia) Slovenian SGP	17			17

2008 Speedway Grand Prix Final Championship standings (Riding No 18)
Race no.	Grand Prix	Pos.	Pts.	Heats	Draw No
1 /	(Slovenia) Slovenian SGP	injury → (18) Denis Štojs			18

permanent speedway rider
wild card, track reserve or qualified reserve
rider not classified (track reserve who did not start)

== See also ==
- Slovenia national speedway team
