= 2002 Speedway Grand Prix of Australia =

Speedway Grand Prix event

- Venue: Stadium Australia
- Location: Sydney, (Australia)
- Start date: 26 October 2002
- Competitors: 24

The 2002 Speedway Grand Prix of Australia was the tenth and final round of the 2002 Speedway Grand Prix season (the world championship). It took place on 26 October 2002 at the Stadium Australia in Sydney, Australia.

It was the first time that the Speedway Grand Prix of Australia had been held and the Speedway Grand Prix would not return to Australia again until 2015.

The Grand Prix was by the American rider Greg Hancock (his 5th career Grand Prix win).

== Grand Prix result ==
Pos.	Rider	1	2	3	4	5	6	SF1	SF2	Final	GP Points
1	(United States) Greg Hancock	0	3	2					3	3	25
2	(England) Scott Nicholls	3	3	1	3	2			2	2	20
3	(Australia) Jason Crump	2	3	3				2		1	18
4	(Norway) Rune Holta	0	0	2	2			3		0	16
5	(Sweden) Mikael Karlsson	1	3	3	2	1	3		1		13
6	(Sweden) Andreas Jonsson	2	2	3	2			1			13
7	(Australia) Ryan Sullivan	1	2	1	3			t			11
8	(Czech Republic) Lukáš Dryml	3	3	3	3				0		11
9	(Sweden) Tony Rickardsson	3	2	0	1						8
10	(Poland) Tomasz Gollob	3	2	0	1						8
11	(United States) Billy Hamill	1	0	3	0						7
12	(Australia) Steve Johnston	2	1	3	0	2	0				7
13	(Slovenia) Matej Ferjan	3	0	2	1	1					6
14	(Denmark) Nicki Pedersen	2	0	1							6
15	(Australia) Leigh Adams	3	2	1	0						5
16	(Poland) Sebastian Ułamek	2	f	2	0	0					5
17	(Australia) Todd Wiltshire	1	2	1							4
18	(Poland) Krzysztof Cegielski	2	1	1							4
19	(Australia) Mick Poole	1	3	0							3
20	(Australia) Jason Lyons	0	2	0							3
21	(Czech Republic) Bohumil Brhel	1	ef								2
22	(Sweden) Niklas Klingberg	0	1								2
23	(England) Andy Smith	0	0								1
24	(England) Mark Loram	ns	ns								1

== Heat by heat ==
- Heat 1 Nicholls, Cegielski, Poole, Klingberg
- Heat 2 Dryml, Ulamek, Wiltshire, Lyons (M)
- Heat 3 Adams, Jonsson, Brhel, Smith
- Heat 4 Ferjan, Johnston, Karlsson, Loram (NS)
- Heat 5 Poole, Lyons, Brhel (EF), Loram (NS)
- Heat 6 Karlsson, Wiltshire, Klingberg, Smith
- Heat 7 Nicholls, Adams, Johnston, Ulamek (F/X)
- Heat 8 Dryml, Jonsson, Cegielski, Ferjan
- Heat 9 Rickardsson, Crump, Sullivan, Holta
- Heat 10 Gollob, Pedersen, Hamill, Hancock
- Heat 11 Johnston, Ferjan, Wiltshire, Poole
- Heat 12 Karlsson, Ulamek, Cegielski, Lyons
- Heat 13 Hancock, Rickardsson, Nicholls, Ulamek
- Heat 14 Dryml, Sullivan, Ferjan, Pedersen
- Heat 15 Crump, Karlsson, Adams, Hamill
- Heat 16 Jonsson, Gollob, Johnston (M), Holta (F/X)
- Heat 17 Nicholls, Holta, Pedersen, Adams
- Heat 18 Hamill, Johnston, Ferjan, Ulamek
- Heat 19 Crump, Hancock, Sullivan, Gollob
- Heat 20 Dryml, Jonsson, Karlsson, Rickardsson
- Heat 21 Sullivan, Nicholls, Rickardsson, Johnston
- Heat 22 Karlsson, Holta, Gollob, Hamill
- Semi-finals
- Heat 23 Holta, Crump, Jonsson, Sullivan (T)
- Heat 24 Hancock, Nicholls, Karlsson (F), Dryml (F/X)
- Final
- Heat 25 Hancock, Nicholls, Crump, Holta
