= Australian Grand Prix (disambiguation) =

Australian Grand Prix can refer to:

- Australian Grand Prix, a Formula One motor race
- Australian motorcycle Grand Prix
- Speedway Grand Prix of Australia
