= 2002 Speedway World Cup Event 2 =

Information
- Date: 5 August 2002
- City: Poole
- Event: 2 of 5 (7)

Stadium details
- Stadium: Poole Stadium

SWC Results
Winner		Sweden - 55 pts
Runner-up		Denmark - 41 pts
3rd place		Finland - 32 pts
4th place		Hungary - 19 pts

The 2002 Speedway World Cup Event 2 was the second race of the 2002 Speedway World Cup season. It took place on August 5, 2002 in the Poole Stadium in Poole, Great Britain.

== Results ==
Pos.	National team	Pts.
1	Sweden	55
2	Denmark	41
3	Finland	32
4	Hungary	19

== Heat details ==
Placing	Team / Rider Name	Total	1	2	3	4	5	6	7	8	9	10	11	12	13	14	15	16	17	18	19	20	Pts	21	22	23	24
1	Sweden	60	3	5	8	11	14	17	20	23	26	28	31	32	35	38	39	40	43	43	46	47		50	50	52	60
1	(1) Tony Rickardsson	15				3					3					3					3		12				3
1	(2) Peter Karlsson	9			3					3					3					0			9		0
1	(3) Stefan Andersson	10		2					3					1				1					7	3
1	(4) Mikael Karlsson	14	3					3					3						3				12			2
1	(5) Niklas Klingberg	7					3					2					1					1	7
2	Denmark	41	0	3	3	5	5	6	8	9	11	11	13	16	18	19	21	24	26	27	29	32		34	37	40	41
2	(1) Nicki Pedersen	9	0						2						2						2		6		3
2	(2) Ronni Pedersen	8		3				1				0				1				1			6	2
2	(3) Bjarne Pedersen	11				2				1				3					2				8			3
2	(4) Hans N. Andersen	11			0						2		2					3				3	10				1
2	(5) Charlie Gjedde	2					X					-					2					-	2
3	Finland	32	2	2	4	4	5	7	8	12	12	15	16	18	19	19	22	22	22	25	26	28		29	31	32	32
3	(1) Kaj Laukkanen	12			2			2		4J				2							1		11			1
3	(2) Kauko Nieminen	4				0			1				1					0		-			2		2
3	(3) Tomi Reima	1		0							0				1				0				1
3	(4) Toni Salmela	3	2							-						0		-					2	1
3	(5) Joonas Kylmäkorpi	12					1					3					3			3		2	12				0
4	Hungary	19	1	2	3	4	6	6	6	6	7	8	8	8	8	10	10	12	14	16	16	16		16	17	17	19
4	(1) Attila Stefani	1		1						0			0								0		1
4	(2) Sándor Tihanyi	4	1								1			0			0			2			4			0
4	(3) Laszlo Szatmari	7			1				0							2			2				5				2
4	(4) Norbert Magosi	4				1		0							0			2				0	3		1
4	(5) Csaba Hell	3					2					1					-					-	3	0
Placing	Team / Rider Name	Total	1	2	3	4	5	6	7	8	9	10	11	12	13	14	15	16	17	18	19	20	Pts	21	22	23	24

M - exclusion for exceeding two minute time allowance • T - exclusion for touching the tapes • X - other exclusion • E - retired or mechanical failure • F - fell

Helmet colours was permanent for each teams (Red, Blue, White and Yellow/Black). Colours in diagrams means gate positions:
gate A – inside	gate B	gate C	gate D – outside

== See also ==
- 2002 Speedway World Cup
- motorcycle speedway
