= 2002 Speedway Grand Prix of Denmark =

Speedway Grand Prix event

- Venue: Vojens Speedway Center
- Location: Vojens, (Denmark)
- Start date: 28 September 2002
- Competitors: 24

The 2002 Speedway Grand Prix of Denmark was the ninth round of the 2002 Speedway Grand Prix season (the world championship). It took place on 28 September 2002 at the Vojens Speedway Center in Vojens, Denmark.

It was the 8th time that the Speedway Grand Prix of Denmark had been held.

The Grand Prix was by the Swedish rider Tony Rickardsson (his 11th career Grand Prix win).

== Grand Prix result ==
| Pos. | Rider | 1 | 2 | 3 | 4 | 5 | 6 | SF1 | SF2 | Final | GP Points |
|---|---|---|---|---|---|---|---|---|---|---|---|
| 1 | (Sweden) Tony Rickardsson | 3 | 3 | 1 | 3 | | | 3 | | 3 | 25 |
| 2 | (Poland) Tomasz Gollob | 2 | 3 | 2 | 2 | 1 | 3 | 2 | | 2 | 20 |
| 3 | (United States) Billy Hamill | 3 | 2 | 3 | 2 | | | | 2 | 1 | 18 |
| 4 | (Australia) Jason Crump | 3 | 3 | 3 | | | | | 3 | 0 | 16 |
| 5 | (Australia) Ryan Sullivan | 2 | 1 | 3 | 2 | | | 1 | | | 13 |
| 6 | (United States) Greg Hancock | 3 | 0 | 2 | 1 | 3 | 2 | | 1 | | 13 |
| 7 | (Norway) Rune Holta | 3 | 3 | 0 | 2 | 3 | | | 0 | | 11 |
| 8 | (Denmark) Nicki Pedersen | 1 | 2 | 3 | | | | 0 | | | 11 |
| 9 | (England) Scott Nicholls | 2 | 2 | f | 3 | | | | | | 8 |
| 10 | (Czech Republic) Lukáš Dryml | 3 | 2 | 1 | 2 | 1 | | | | | 8 |
| 11 | (Denmark) Bjarne Pedersen | f | 3 | 2 | 3 | f | 0 | | | | 7 |
| 12 | (Australia) Leigh Adams | 0 | 2 | 0 | 0 | | | | | | 7 |
| 13 | (Sweden) Mikael Karlsson | 1 | 1 | 1 | | | | | | | 6 |
| 14 | (Poland) Piotr Protasiewicz | 0 | 0 | 1 | | | | | | | 6 |
| 15 | (England) Mark Loram | 2 | 1 | 3 | ef | ef | | | | | 5 |
| 16 | (Sweden) Peter Karlsson | 2 | 1 | 3 | 0 | 0 | | | | | 5 |
| 17 | (Poland) Sebastian Ułamek | f | 2 | 1 | | | | | | | 4 |
| 18 | (Sweden) Andreas Jonsson | 2 | ef | 0 | | | | | | | 4 |
| 19 | (Sweden) Niklas Klingberg | 1 | 2 | f | | | | | | | 3 |
| 20 | (Denmark) Ronni Pedersen | 1 | 3 | 0 | | | | | | | 3 |
| 21 | (Australia) Todd Wiltshire | 0 | 1 | | | | | | | | 2 |
| 22 | (Slovenia) Matej Ferjan | 1 | 1 | | | | | | | | 2 |
| 23 | (England) Andy Smith | 0 | 0 | | | | | | | | 1 |
| 24 | (Denmark) Hans Andersen | f | 0 | | | | | | | | 1 |

== Heat by heat ==
- Heat 1 Hamill, Jonsson, Ulamek (F), Andersen (F/X)
- Heat 2 Dryml, Gollob, R Pedersen, B Pedersen (F/X)
- Heat 3 Hancock, Loram, Ferjan, Wiltshire
- Heat 4 Holta, P Karlsson, Klingberg, Smith
- Heat 5 B Pedersen, Ulamek, Ferjan, Smith
- Heat 6 R Pedersen, Klingberg, Wiltshire, Andersen
- Heat 7 Gollob, Hamill, P Karlsson, Hancock
- Heat 8 Holta, Dryml, Loram, Jonsson (EF)
- Heat 9 Rickardsson, Nicholls, N Pedersen, Adams
- Heat 10 Crump, Sullivan, M Karlsson, Protasiewicz
- Heat 11 P Karlsson, B Pedersen, Jonsson (M), Klingberg (F/X)
- Heat 12 Loram, Hancock, Ulamek, R Pedersen
- Heat 13 Rickardsson, Gollob, Hancock, Protasiewicz
- Heat 14 B Pedersen, N Pedersen, Sullivan, Holta
- Heat 15 Hamill, Nicholls, M Karlsson, Loram (EF)
- Heat 16 Crump, Adams, Dryml, P Karlsson
- Heat 17 Hancock, Holta, M Karlsson, P Karlsson
- Heat 18 Sullivan, Dryml, Protasiewicz, Loram (EF)
- Heat 19 N Pedersen, Hamill, Rickardsson, Adams
- Heat 20 Crump, Gollob, Nicholls (F/X), B Pedersen (F/X)
- Heat 21 Rickardsson, Hancock, Dryml, B Pedersen
- Heat 22 Holta, Sullivan, Nicholls, Adams
- Semi-finals
- Heat 23 Rickardsson, Gollob, Sullivan, N Pedersen
- Heat 24 Crump, Hamill, Hancock, Holta
- Final
- Heat 25 Rickardsson, Gollob, Hamill, Crump
