= Izak Šantej =

Slovenian speedway rider

- Born: August 26, 1973 (age 53); Slovenia
- Nationality: Slovenian

Career history
- 1998-2001: Świętochłowice
- 2002: Kraków
- 2007: Poznań
- 2008: Krosno

Individual honours
- 10 times: Slovenian national runner-up

Izak Šantej (born August 26, 1973 in Slovenia) is a Slovenian motorcycle speedway rider who rode in the Speedway Grand Prix series. He is a ten times silver medal winner at Slovenian championship.

== Career ==
Šantej medalled 12 times at the Slovenian Individual Speedway Championship. Although he won ten silver medals and two bronze medals, he never became champion of Slovenia, being denied the gold medal five times by Matej Žagar and five times by Matej Ferjan.

Šantej represented Slovenia in the 2001 Speedway World Cup and 2002 Speedway World Cup.

== Family ==
Šantej and his wife, Hermina, have three children, Žan, Miha and Sara.

== Speedway Grand Prix results ==
2002 Speedway Grand Prix Final Championship standings (Riding No 23)
Race no.	Grand Prix	Pos.	Pts.	Heats	Draw No
4 /10	(Slovenia) Slovenian SGP	24	1	(0,0)	23

2003 Speedway Grand Prix Final Championship standings (Riding No 24)
Race no.	Grand Prix	Pos.	Pts.	Heats	Draw No
5 /9	(Slovenia) Slovenian SGP	17	4	(1,2,1)	24

2004 Speedway Grand Prix Final Championship standings (Riding No 24)
Race no.	Grand Prix	Pos.	Pts.	Heats	Draw No
7 /9	(Slovenia) Slovenian SGP	24	1	(0,0)	24

2005 Speedway Grand Prix Final Championship standings (Riding No 17)
Race no.	Grand Prix	Pos.	Pts.	Heats	Draw No
3 /9	(Slovenia) Slovenian SGP	17	-	-	17

2006 Speedway Grand Prix Final Championship standings (Riding No 17)
Race no.	Grand Prix	Pos.	Pts.	Heats	Draw No
1 /10	(Slovenia) Slovenian SGP	17	-	-	17

2007 Speedway Grand Prix Final Championship standings (Riding No 18)
Race no.	Grand Prix	Pos.	Pts.	Heats	Draw No
10 /11	(Slovenia) Slovenian SGP	18	-	-	18

2008 Speedway Grand Prix Final Championship standings (Riding No 17)
Race no.	Grand Prix	Pos.	Pts.	Heats	Draw No
1 /11	(Slovenia) Slovenian SGP	17	-	-	17

permanent speedway rider
wild card, track reserve or qualified reserve
rider not classified (track reserve who did not start)

== Career highlights ==
- Individual World Championship (Speedway Grand Prix):
  - 2002 - 39th place (1 point)
  - 2003 - 35th place (4 points)
  - 2004 - 41st place (1 point)
- Team World Championship (Speedway World Cup):
  - 2000 - 2nd place in Quarter-Final 2 (12 points)
  - 2001 - 12th place (5 points in Event 2)
  - 2002 - 11th place (6 points in Event 3)
  - 2003 - 9th place (4 points in Event 2)
  - 2004 - 2nd place in Qualifying Round 2 (13 points)
  - 2005 - 2nd place in Qualifying Round 2 (3 points)
  - 2006 - 2nd place in Qualifying Round 2 (8 points)
  - 2007 - 4th place in Qualifying Round 1 (8 points)
- Individual European Championship:
  - 2001 - 14th place (3 points)
  - 2004 - 14th place (3 points)
  - 2007 - 13th place in Qualifying Round 1 (4 points)
  - 2008 - 10th place in Semi-Final 1 (6 points)
- European Pairs Championship:
  - 2004 - 6th place (7 points)
  - 2005 - 3rd place (6 points)
  - 2006 - 2nd place (dit not started in Final)
  - 2007 - 4th place in Semi-Final 1 (9 points)
  - 2008 - 5th place in Semi-Final 1 (9 points)
- European Club Champions' Cup:
  - 1998 - 2nd place in Group A (12 points)
  - 1999 - 2nd place in Group (10 points)
  - 2003 - 3rd place
  - 2004 - 3rd place (13 points)
  - 2006 - 3rd place in Semi-Final 2 (5 points)
  - 2007 - 3rd place in Semi-Final 1 (14 points)
- Individual Slovenian Championship:
  - 1995 - 3rd place
  - 1997 - 2nd place
  - 1998 - 2nd place
  - 1999 - 2nd place
  - 2000 - 2nd place
  - 2001 - 2nd place
  - 2002 - 2nd place
  - 2003 - 2nd place
  - 2004 - 2nd place
  - 2006 - 2nd place
  - 2007 - 3rd place
  - 2008 - 2nd place
- Team Slovenian Championship:
  - 1993 - 2nd place (AMD Krsko)
  - 1995 - 2nd place (AMD Krsko)
  - 1996 - Slovenian Champion (AMD Krsko)
  - 1997 - 2nd place (AMD Krsko)
  - 1998 - 2nd place (AMD Krsko)
  - 1999 - 2nd place (AMD Krsko)
  - 2000 - 2nd place (AMD Krsko)
  - 2001 - 2nd place (AMD Krsko)
  - 2002 - 2nd place (AMD Krsko)
  - 2003 - 2nd place (AMD Krsko)
  - 2004 - Slovenian Champion (AMD Krsko)

== See also ==
- Slovenia national speedway team
- List of Speedway Grand Prix riders
