= 2002 Speedway Grand Prix =

World speedway championship season

Season details
- Dates: 11 May - 26 October
- Events: 10
- Cities: 10
- Countries: 8
- Riders: 22 permanents 2 wild card(s)
- Heats: 250 (in 10 events)

Winners
- Champion: SWE Tony Rickardsson
- Runner-up: AUS Jason Crump
- 3rd place: AUS Ryan Sullivan

The 2002 Speedway Grand Prix was the 57th edition of the official World Championship and the eighth season in the Speedway Grand Prix era used to determine the Speedway World Champion. The world title was won by Tony Rickardsson of Sweden.

== Event format ==
The system first used in 1998 continued to be adopted with 24 riders, divided into two classes. The eight best would be directly qualified for the "Main Event", while the sixteen others would be knocked out if they finished out of the top two in 4-man heats on two occasions - while they would go through if they finished inside the top two on two occasions. This resulted in 10 heats, where eight proceeded to the Main Event, where exactly the same system was applied to give eight riders to a semi-final.

The semi-finals were then two heats of four, where the top two qualified for a final - there was no consolation final. The 4 finalists scored 25, 20, 18 and 16 points, with 5th and 6th place getting 13, 7th and 8th 11, and after that 8, 8, 7, 7, etc. Places after 8th place were awarded according to the time a rider was knocked out and, secondly, according to position in the last heat he rode in.

== Qualification for Grand Prix ==
The 2002 season had 22 permanent riders and two wild cards at each event. The permanent riders are highlighted in the results table below.

== 2002 event schedule and winners ==
Calendar

| Date | Grand Prix | Venue | Winner | Result |
|---|---|---|---|---|
| 11 May | Norway | Vikingskipet, Hamar | (Sweden) Tony Rickardsson | 2002 Norwegian GP |
| 25 May | Poland | Polonia Stadium, Bydgoszcz | (Poland) Tomasz Gollob | 2002 Polish GP |
| 8 June | Great Britain | Millennium Stadium, Cardiff | (Australia) Ryan Sullivan | 2002 British GP |
| 22 June | Slovenia | Matija Gubec Stadium, Krško | (Australia) Ryan Sullivan | 2002 Slovenian GP |
| 6 July | Sweden | Olympiastadion, Stockholm | (Sweden) Tony Rickardsson | 2002 Swedish GP |
| 20 July | Czech Republic | Markéta Stadium, Prague | (Australia) Jason Crump | 2002 Czech Republic GP |
| 31 August | Scandinavia | Ullevi, Gothenburg | (Australia) Leigh Adams | 2002 Scandinavian GP |
| 14 September | Europe | Stadion Śląski, Chorzów | (Denmark) Nicki Pedersen | 2002 European GP |
| 28 September | Denmark | Vojens Speedway Center, Vojens | (Sweden) Tony Rickardsson | 2002 Danish GP |
| 26 October | Australia | Stadium Australia, Sydney | (United States) Greg Hancock | 2002 Australian GP |

Final 2002 standings

| Pos | Rider | Total | NOR | POL | GBR | SVN | SWE | CZE | SCA | EUR | DEN | AUS |
|---|---|---|---|---|---|---|---|---|---|---|---|---|
| 1 | (Sweden) Tony Rickardsson | 181 | 25 | 20 | 13 | 13 | 25 | 16 | 20 | 16 | 25 | 8 |
| 2 | (Australia) Jason Crump | 162 | 16 | 16 | 11 | 11 | 16 | 25 | 13 | 20 | 16 | 18 |
| 3 | (Australia) Ryan Sullivan | 158 | 20 | 13 | 25 | 25 | 11 | 18 | 11 | 11 | 13 | 11 |
| 4 | (Australia) Leigh Adams | 127 | 13 | 13 | 16 | 13 | 13 | 11 | 25 | 11 | 7 | 5 |
| 5 | (Sweden) Mikael Karlsson | 122 | 18 | 7 | 18 | 11 | 11 | 7 | 13 | 18 | 6 | 13 |
| 6 | (United States) Greg Hancock | 122 | 8 | 4 | 4 | 8 | 18 | 20 | 16 | 6 | 13 | 25 |
| 7 | (Poland) Tomasz Gollob | 117 | 7 | 25 | 11 | 20 | 8 | 8 | 5 | 5 | 20 | 8 |
| 8 | (United Kingdom) Mark Loram | 97 | 8 | 18 | 8 | 18 | 13 | 13 | 6 | 7 | 5 | 1 |
| 9 | (United States) Billy Hamill | 95 | 11 | 11 | 7 | 7 | 7 | 13 | 6 | 8 | 18 | 7 |
| 10 | (Czech Republic) Lukáš Dryml | 95 | 5 | 1 | 6 | 7 | 20 | 11 | 18 | 8 | 8 | 11 |
| 11 | (Norway) Rune Holta | 80 | 1 | 11 | 5 | 5 | 6 | 7 | 11 | 7 | 11 | 16 |
| 12 | (Denmark) Nicki Pedersen | 73 | 2 | 4 | 2 | 5 | 4 | 6 | 8 | 25 | 11 | 6 |
| 13 | (United Kingdom) Scott Nicholls | 72 | 3 | 5 | 8 | 4 | - | 4 | 7 | 13 | 8 | 20 |
| 14 | (Sweden) Andreas Jonsson | 70 | 3 | 8 | 7 | 16 | 7 | 5 | 4 | 3 | 4 | 13 |
| 15 | (Australia) Todd Wiltshire | 63 | 11 | 8 | 20 | 6 | 1 | 2 | 7 | 2 | 2 | 4 |
| 16 | (Poland) Krzysztof Cegielski | 55 | 4 | 3 | 1 | 8 | 6 | 8 | 8 | 13 | - | 4 |
| 17 | (Poland) Sebastian Ułamek | 39 | 2 | 6 | 5 | 4 | 3 | 3 | 2 | 5 | 4 | 5 |
| 18 | (Sweden) Niklas Klingberg | 37 | 5 | 3 | 3 | 3 | 5 | 3 | 4 | 6 | 3 | 2 |
| 19 | (United Kingdom) Carl Stonehewer | 30 | 13 | 5 | 2 | 1 | 2 | 4 | 3 | - | - | - |
| 20 | (United Kingdom) Andy Smith | 29 | 4 | 6 | 4 | 6 | 2 | 2 | 1 | 2 | 1 | 1 |
| 21 | (Poland) Grzegorz Walasek | 25 | 7 | 2 | 3 | 3 | 5 | 5 | - | - | - | - |
| 22 | (Slovenia) Matej Ferjan | 22 | 1 | 1 | 1 | 2 | 1 | 6 | 1 | 1 | 2 | 6 |
| 23 | (Sweden) Peter Karlsson | 21 | - | - | - | - | 8 | - | 5 | 3 | 5 | - |
| 24 | (Poland) Piotr Protasiewicz | 18 | - | 7 | - | - | 4 | - | - | 1 | 6 | - |
| 25 | (United Kingdom) Lee Richardson | 17 | - | - | 13 | - | - | - | - | 4 | - | - |
| 26 | (Denmark) Bjarne Pedersen | 10 | - | - | - | - | - | - | 3 | - | 7 | - |
| 27 | (Australia) Steve Johnston | 7 | - | - | - | - | - | - | - | - | - | 7 |
| 28 | (Norway) Lars Gunnestad | 6 | 6 | - | - | - | - | - | - | - | - | - |
| 29 | (United Kingdom) Joe Screen | 6 | - | - | 6 | - | - | - | - | - | - | - |
| 30 | (Poland) Jarosław Hampel | 6 | - | 2 | - | - | - | - | - | 4 | - | - |
| 31 | (Finland) Kaj Laukkanen | 6 | 6 | - | - | - | - | - | - | - | - | - |
| 32 | (Sweden) Freddie Eriksson | 3 | - | - | - | - | 3 | - | - | - | - | - |
| 33 | (Czech Republic) Bohumil Brhel | 3 | - | - | - | - | - | 1 | - | - | - | 2 |
| 34 | (Australia) Mick Poole | 3 | - | - | - | - | - | - | - | - | - | 3 |
| 35 | (Australia) Jason Lyons | 3 | - | - | - | - | - | - | - | - | - | 3 |
| 36 | (Denmark) Ronni Pedersen | 3 | - | - | - | - | - | - | - | - | 3 | - |
| 37 | (Hungary) Sándor Tihanyi | 2 | - | - | - | 2 | - | - | - | - | - | - |
| 38 | (Sweden) David Ruud | 2 | - | - | - | - | - | - | 2 | - | - | - |
| 39 | (Slovenia) Izak Šantej | 1 | - | - | - | 1 | - | - | - | - | - | - |
| 40 | (Denmark) Hans Andersen | 1 | - | - | - | - | - | - | - | - | 1 | - |
| 41 | (Czech Republic) Aleš Dryml | 1 | - | - | - | - | - | 1 | - | - | - | - |
