= 2000 Speedway Under-21 World Championship =

European motorcycle speedway event

World Under-21 Championship
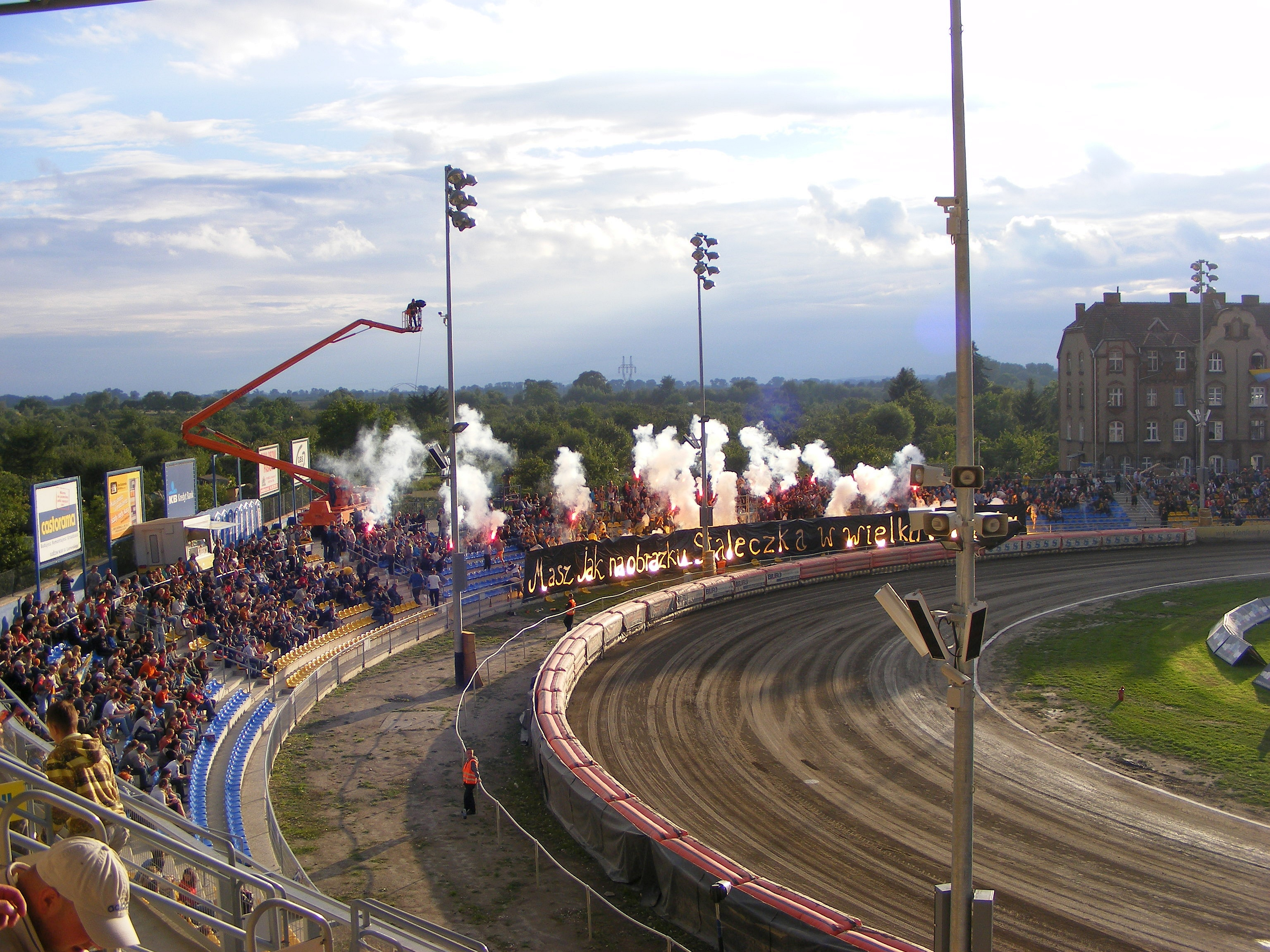
- The Edward Jancarz Stadium
- Venue: Edward Jancarz Stadium
- Location: Gorzów Wielkopolski, Poland
- Start date: 27 August 2000

The 2000 Individual Speedway Junior World Championship was the 24th edition of the World motorcycle speedway Under-21 Championships.

The event was won by Andreas Jonsson of Sweden. By winning the event he also gained qualification to the Speedway Grand Prix Challenge.

== Qualifying ==
- 1 May (Czech Republic) Mšeno Speedway Stadium, Mšeno
- 14 May (Portugal) Santarém Speedway, Santarém
- 28 May (Finland) Seinäjoki Speedway, Seinäjoki
- 4 June (Poland) Polonia Bydgoszcz Stadium, Bydgoszcz

== Semi-finals ==
- 5 August (Sweden) Norrköping Motorstadion, Norrköping
- 5 August (Germany) Rottalstadion, Pocking

== World final ==
- 27 August 2000
- (Poland) Edward Jancarz Stadium, Gorzów Wielkopolski

Placing	Rider	Total	1	2	3	4	5	6	7	8	9	10	11	12	13	14	15	16	17	18	19	20	Pts	Pos	21
1	(Sweden) (2) Andreas Jonsson	14	2					3				3				3				3			14	1	
2	(Poland) (10) Krzysztof Cegielski	11			3			2						X			3		3				11	2	3
3	(Poland) (8) Jarosław Hampel	11		3						3			2			2			1				11	3	2
4	(Czech Republic) (1) Aleš Dryml, Jr.	11	3				1				3				2				2				11	4	X
5	(Poland) (3) Rafał Okoniewski	10	1						3				1				2				3		10	5	
6	(Czech Republic) (7) Josef Franc	8		2					0					3	1					2			8	6	
7	(Sweden) (9) Emil Kramer	8			2		3						0					2		1			8	7	
8	(England) (4) Simon Stead	8	0							2				2				1				3	8	8	
9	(Poland) (15) Paweł Duszyński	7				1			1			2						3	0				7	9	
10	(Australia) (14) Travis McGowan	6				X		1					3		0							2	6	10	
11	(Denmark) (5) Mads Korneliussen	5		0			2					1					1					1	5	11	
12	(Finland) (16) Joonas Kylmäkorpi with Swedish licence	5				2				1	2						E			E			5	12	
13	(Hungary) (13) Sandor Fekete	4				3	F							1		0					0		4	13	
14	(Australia) (11) Kevin Doolan	4			1				2		0					1						0	4	14	
15	(Sweden) (6) Freddie Eriksson	3		1				0			1							0			1		3	15	
16	(England) (12) David Howe	0			X					E		F			-						-		0	16	
R1	(Denmark) (R1) Hans N. Andersen	3													3								3	R1	
R2	(Poland) (R2) Mariusz Węgrzyk	2																			2		2	R2	
Placing	Rider	Total	1	2	3	4	5	6	7	8	9	10	11	12	13	14	15	16	17	18	19	20	Pts	Pos	21

m - exclusion for exceeding two minute time allowance • t - exclusion for touching the tapes • x - other exclusion • e - retired or mechanical failure • f - fell • ns - non-starter • nc - non-classify

gate A - inside	gate B	gate C	gate D - outside
