= Slovenian Individual Speedway Championship =

Motorcycle speedway championship

- Sport: Motorcycle speedway
- Founded: 1978
- Most titles: Matej Žagar (18)

The Slovenian Individual Speedway Championship is a Motorcycle speedway championship held each year to determine the Slovenian national champion. It was first staged in 1978.

Matej Žagar holds the record, winning 18 championships.

== Winners ==
Year	Winner	2nd	3rd
1978	Stefan Kekec		
1979	Jože Mavsar		
1980	Stefan Kekec		
1981	Stefan Kekec		
1982	Stefan Kekec		
1983	Joze Zibert		
1984	Krešo Omerzel		
1985	Franc Zagar		
1986	Arthur Horvat		
1987	Arthur Horvat		
1988	Zvonko Pavlic		
1989	Martin Peterca		
1990	Gregor Pintar		
1991	Gregor Pintar	Roman Spitaler	Gerhard Lekse
1992	Gregor Pintar	Martin Peterca	Krešo Omerzel
1993	Krešo Omerzel	Martin Peterca	Gerhard Lekse
1994	Gerhard Lekse	Martin Peterca	Roman Spitaler
1995	Gregor Pintar	Martin Peterca	Izak Šantej
1996	Gregor Pintar	Krešo Omerzel	Gerhard Lekse
1997	Matej Ferjan	Izak Šantej	Gerhard Lekse
1998	Matej Ferjan	Izak Šantej	Martin Peterca
1999	Matej Ferjan	Izak Šantej	Thomas Sustersic
2000	Matej Ferjan	Izak Šantej	Thomas Sustersic
2001	Matej Ferjan	Izak Šantej	Jernej Kolenko
2002	Matej Žagar	Izak Šantej	Jernej Kolenko
2003	Matej Žagar	Izak Šantej	Jernej Kolenko
2004	Matej Žagar	Izak Šantej	Denis Štojs
2005	Matej Žagar	Jernej Kolenko	Ales Kraljic
2006	Matej Žagar	Izak Šantej	Jernej Kolenko
2007	Matej Žagar	Jernej Kolenko	Izak Šantej
2008	Matej Žagar	Izak Šantej	Denis Štojs
2009	Matej Žagar	Maks Gregorič	Aleksander Čonda
2010	Matej Žagar	Aleksander Čonda	Ales Kraljic
2011	Matej Žagar	Only Kukovic	Aleksander Čonda
2012	Matej Žagar	Maks Gregorič	Aleksander Čonda
2013	Matej Žagar	Aleksander Čonda	Matic Voldrih
2014	Matej Žagar	Maks Gregorič	Matic Voldrih
2015	Matej Žagar	Aleksander Čonda	Maks Gregoric
2016	Matej Žagar	Nick Škorja	Denis Štojs
2017	Matej Žagar	Nick Škorja	Denis Štojs
2018	Matej Žagar	Matic Ivačič	Nick Škorja
2019	Matej Žagar	Matic Ivačič	Denis Štojs
2020	Matic Ivačič	Nick Škorja	Anže Grmek
2021	Matic Ivačič	Anže Grmek	Nick Škorja
2022	Matic Ivačič	Nick Škorja	Anže Grmek
2023	Matic Ivačič	Anže Grmek	Julian Kuny

== See also ==
Slovenia national speedway team
