= Krešo Omerzel =

Slovenian speedway rider (1957–2016)

- Born: 12 March 1957; Novo Mesto, Slovenia
- Died: 25 October 2016 (aged 59); Novi Sad, Serbia
- Nickname: Kresho
- Nationality: Slovenian

Career history
- 1975: AMD Krško
- 1988: AMTK Ljubljana

Individual honours
- 1985, 1993: Slovenian champion

Team honours
- 1982, 1983, 1984 1985, 1988, 1991: National team champion

Krešo Omerzel (12 March 1957 – 25 October 2016) was a Slovenian motorcycle speedway rider and coach from Krško.

== Career ==
Omerzel's career started in year 1975 and ended in 1998. He is a two-time champion of Slovenia after winning the Slovenian Individual Speedway Championship in 1985 and 1993.

Omerzel died in 2016.

== Family ==
Omerzel was married and a father of two sons.

== Honours ==
- Slovenian Champion: 1985 and 1993
- State championship doubles: 1983 (with Žibert)
- State championship doubles: 1996 (with Šantej)
- Slovenian Club Champion: 1982 (with AMD Krško)
- Slovenian Club Champion: 1983 (with AMD Krško)
- Slovenian Club Champion: 1984 (with AMD Krško)
- Slovenian Club Champion: 1985 (with AMD Krško)
- Slovenian Club Champion: 1988 (with AMTK Ljubljana)
- Slovenian Club Champion: 1991 (with AMTK Ljubljana)
