= David Ruud =

Swedish speedway rider

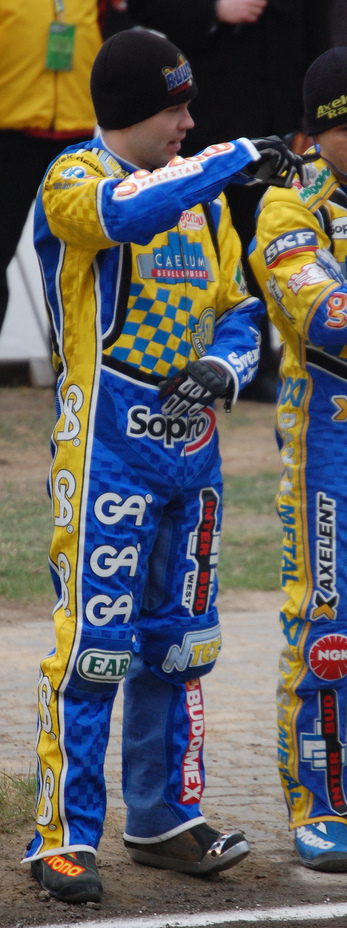
- Born: January 21, 1980 (age 46)
- Nationality: Swedish

Career history

Sweden
- 2000: Kaparna
- 2000–2002, 2008–2014: Lejonen
- 2001–2003: Västervik
- 2004–2005, 2012–2014: Vetlanda
- 2011: Gnistorna

Poland
- 2003: Częstochowa
- 2005: Piła
- 2006–2007 2009–2010: Gorzów
- 2008, 2013–2014: Ostrów
- 2011–2012: Grudziądz

Denmark
- 2008: Holstebro

Great Britain
- 2001, 2003: Poole Pirates
- 2003: Arena Essex Hammers
- 2004: Swindon Robins

Individual honours
- 2001: Swedish U21 champion

Team honours
- 2003: World Cup
- 2003: Polish league champion
- 2000: Swedish Division One Champion

David Ruud (born January 21, 1980) is a former motorcycle speedway rider from Sweden who won 2003 Speedway World Cup with Sweden and earned six caps for the Sweden national speedway team.

== Career ==
Ruud signed for Poole Pirates for the 2001 Elite League speedway season before riding for Arena Essex Hammers in 2003.

Ruud was part of the Swedish team that won the 2003 Speedway World Cup final, held on 9 August in the Speedway Center in Vojens, Denmark. The same season, Ruud won the Team Polish Championship (Speedway Ekstraliga) with Włókniarz Częstochowa during the 2003 Polish speedway season.

== Results ==
=== World Championships ===
- Individual World Championship (Speedway Grand Prix)
  - 2002 - 38th place (2 points in one event)
  - 2003 - 32nd place (4 points in one event)
- Team World Championship (Speedway World Cup)
  - 2003 - (Denmark) Vojens - World Champion (5 points)
- Individual U-21 World Championship
  - 2001 - (England) Peterborough - 7th place (8 points)

=== European Championships ===
- Individual European Championship
  - 2002 - (Poland) Rybnik - 9th place (7 points)
  - 2004 - (Denmark) Holsted - 11th place (6 points)
  - 2005 - (Italy) Lonigo - 7th place (9 points)

== See also ==
- Sweden national speedway team
- List of Speedway Grand Prix riders
