= Polonia Piła Stadium =

Speedway stadium in Piła, Poland

Stadion Polonii Piła
- Location: Bydgoska 76, 64-920 Piła, Poland
- Coordinates: 53°09′20″N 16°45′11″E
- Capacity: 12,000
- Length: 0.3488 km

The Polonia Piła Stadium (Polish: Stadion Polonii Piła) also known as Municipal Sports and Recreation Centre (Polish: Miejski Ośrodek Sportu i Rekreacji (MOSiR)) is a 12,000-capacity motorcycle speedway and association football stadium in Piła, Poland.

The venue is used by the speedway team Polonia Piła, who compete in the Team Speedway Polish Championship.

== History ==
The stadium was built in 1927 and 1928 and was called the Erika-Sportplatz. In 1956, the Polonia Piła speedway team moved to the stadium and remained there from 1956 until 1967. Only sporadic speedway meetings were held afterwards and then ceased altogether.

It was not until 1990 that work began on rebuilding the speedway track and in 1992 Polonia Piła returned for the 1992 Polish speedway season. At the same time the east stand underwent renovation.

In 1997, the venue hosted the 1997 Speedway World Team Cup final and the following year hosted the final of the 1998 Speedway Under-21 World Championship.

In 2021, it was announced with the help of government funding that a PLN 16.65 million renovation project would begin in 2022.
