= 1998 Speedway Under-21 World Championship =

European motorcycle speedway event

World Under-21 Championship
- Venue: Stadion Polonii Piła
- Location: Piła, Poland
- Start date: 1 August 1998

The 1998 Individual Speedway Junior World Championship was the 22nd edition of the World motorcycle speedway Under-21 Championships.

The final was won by Robert Dados of Poland. The success also gained him qualification to 1999 Speedway Grand Prix.

== World final ==
- 1 August 1998
- (Poland) Stadion Polonii Piła, Piła

Placing	Rider	Total	1	2	3	4	5	6	7	8	9	10	11	12	13	14	15	16	17	18	19	20	Pts	Pos	21
1	(Poland) (2) Robert Dados	14	2					3				3				3				3			14	1	3
2	(Poland) (5) Krzysztof Jabłoński	14		3			3					2					3					3	14	2	2
3	(Slovenia) (12) Matej Ferjan	12			2					3		1			3						3		12	3	
4	(Denmark) (9) Nicki Pedersen	11			3		0						3					3		2			11	4	
5	(England) (6) Leigh Lanham	9		1				2			3							2			1		9	5	
6	(England) (13) Scott Nicholls	8				3	1							2		2					F		8	6	
7	(England) (4) Lee Richardson	8	1							1				3				1				2	8	7	
8	(Poland) (7) Damian Baliński	7		2					3					1	E					1			7	8	
9	(Poland) (8) Rafał Okoniewski	7		0						2			2			1			2				7	9	
10	(Sweden) (1) Andreas Jonsson	5	3				2				F/X				-				-				5	10	
11	(Poland) (10) Robert Kościecha	5			1			F						0			1		3				5	11	
12	(Canada) (3) Krzysztof Słaboń	5	E						0				1				2				2		5	12	
13	(Sweden) (15) Kenny Olsson	3				2			1			0						0	0				3	13	
14	(England) (16) Andre Compton	3				1				0	2						0			0			3	14	
15	(Hungary) (14) Sándor Fekete	3				0		1					0		1							1	3	15	
16	(Hungary) (11) László Szatmári	0			F				-		-					-						-	0	16	
R1	(Australia) (R1) Nigel Sadler	5							2						2				1				5	R1	
R2	(Slovenia) (R2) Ales Dolinar	1									1					0						0	1	R2	
Placing	Rider	Total	1	2	3	4	5	6	7	8	9	10	11	12	13	14	15	16	17	18	19	20	Pts	Pos	21

m - exclusion for exceeding two minute time allowance • t - exclusion for touching the tapes • x - other exclusion • e - retired or mechanical failure • f - fell • ns - non-starter • nc - non-classify

gate A - inside	gate B	gate C	gate D - outside
