= Speedway Grand Prix of Australia =

World championship speedway event

- Stadium: Docklands Stadium, Melbourne, Victoria
- Years: 4 (2002, 2015-2017, 2019-date)
- Track: temporary track
- Track Length: 346 m

Last Event (season 2017)
- Date: 28 October 2017
- Referee: Carif Ackroyd
- Winner: (Australia) Jason Doyle
- 2nd place: (United Kingdom) Tai Woffinden
- 3rd place: (Poland) Bartosz Zmarzlik

The Speedway Grand Prix of Australia is a speedway event that is part of the Speedway Grand Prix Series.

The inaugural event, run on a 400 metres (440 yards) long temporary track at Stadium Australia in Sydney, was won by American rider Greg Hancock, from England's Scott Nicholls and Australian Jason Crump in 2002. The event was not retained in 2003, and it was 13 years before a Grand Prix returned to Australia.

The Speedway Grand Prix of Australian was resurrected in 2015, this time taking place at the Docklands Stadium in Melbourne. The event was once again won by Hancock.

== Winners ==
	Season	City	Stadium	Winner
1	2002	Sydney	Stadium Australia	(United States) Greg Hancock	result
2	2015	Melbourne	Docklands Stadium	(United States) Greg Hancock	result
3	2016	Melbourne	Docklands Stadium	(Australia) Chris Holder	result
4	2017	Melbourne	Docklands Stadium	(Australia) Jason Doyle	result

== Most wins ==
(United States) Greg Hancock 2 times
(Australia) Chris Holder 1 time
(Australia) Jason Doyle 1 time

== Future ==
Despite Australia being the birthplace of motorcycle speedway in 1923, and producing three World Champions since 2002 in Jason Crump (2004, 2006 and 2009), Chris Holder (2012) and Jason Doyle in 2017, as well as dual Under-21 World Champion Darcy Ward (2009, 2010), the Speedway Grand Prix of Australia had not returned to the SGP calendar as of 2014.

This changed from 2015 with Docklands Stadium in Melbourne, a 53,359 seat stadium with a retractable roof and movable seating, signing a 5-year deal to host the event. Eithad is mostly used by the Australian Football League so a temporary track some 346 metres (378 yards) long will be installed for the 2015 event which was held on 24 October (after the end of the 2015 AFL season). The Grand Prix was the 12th and final round of the 2015 Speedway Grand Prix series. The event didn't take place in 2018 because of Docklands Stadium pulling out of the contract and a replacement venue has yet to be found.

Triple World Champion Jason Crump and ten time Australian Champion Leigh Adams served as Australian SGP ambassadors in 2015.
