= Krzysztof Jabłoński =

Polish speedway rider (born 1977)

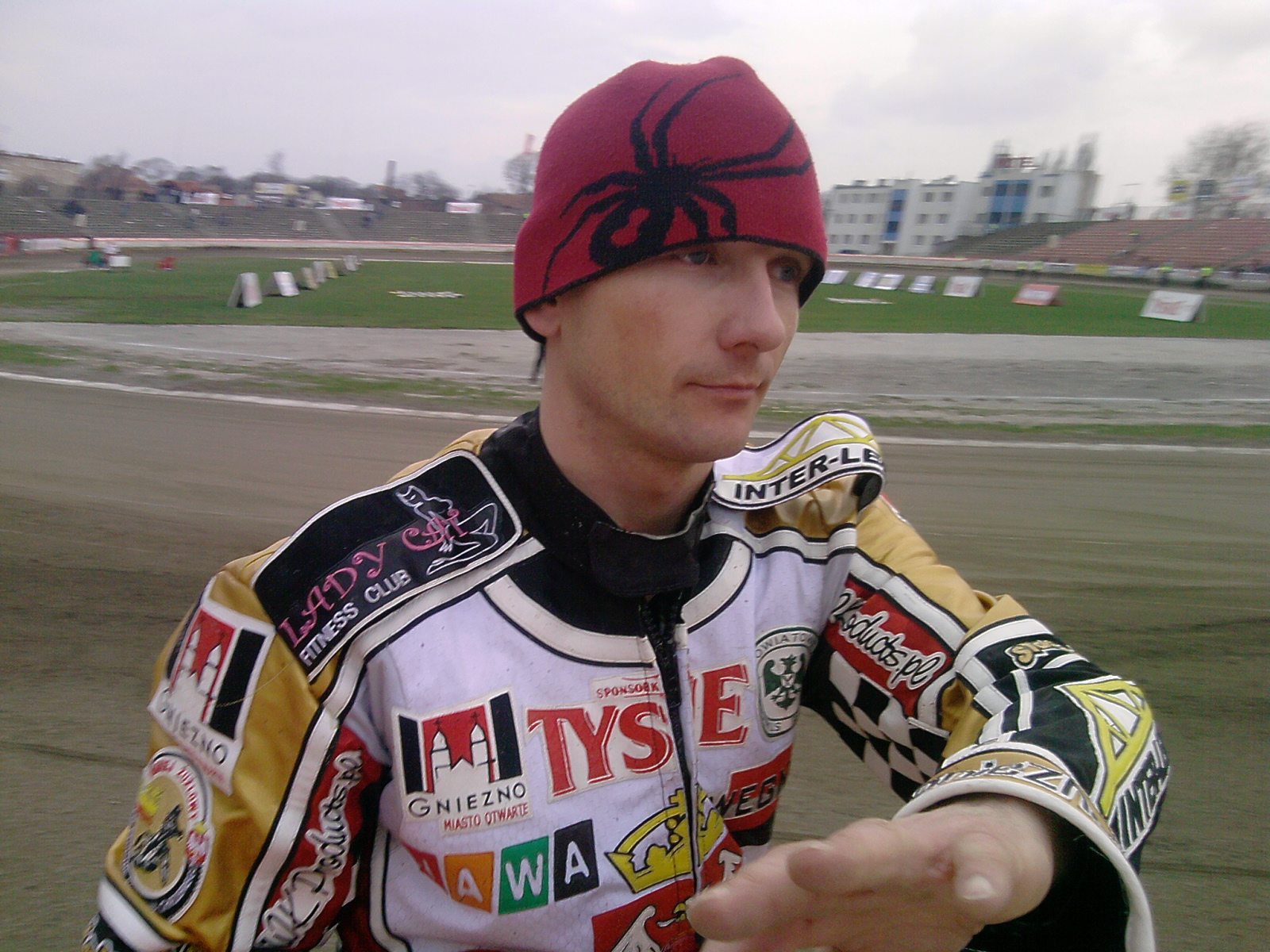
- Born: 30 September 1977 (age 49); Gniezno, Poland
- Nationality: Polish

Career history

Poland
- 1993–2000, 2002–2003, 2009–2011, 2017: Gniezno
- 2001: Piła
- 2004–2008, 2013, 2015–2016: Gdańsk
- 2012–2015: Zielona Góra

Denmark
- 2000: Brovst
- 2003–2004: Kronjylland
- 2013–2014: Outrup/Varde

Great Britain
- 2001: Wolverhampton
- 2002: Oxford
- 2008: Lakeside

Sweden
- 2000: Vargarna
- 2004: Västervik

Individual honours
- 2006: European Champion

Team honours
- 2007 - 2nd: European Pairs Championship

Krzysztof Jabłoński (born 30 September 1977 in Gniezno, Poland) is a former motorcycle speedway rider from Poland.

== Career ==
Jabłoński won European Champion titles and was a member of the Polish national team.

In Sweden, Jabłoński rode for Västervik Speedway during 2004.

In October 2008, Jabłoński joined the Lakeside Hammers speedway team in the UK, during an injury crisis during the 2008 Elite League speedway season. He previously rode in Britain for Wolverhampton Wolves in 2001 and for Oxford Cheetahs in 2002.

== Family ==
His brother, Mirosław Jabłoński (b. 1985) is also a speedway rider.

== Results ==
=== Individual U-21 World Championship ===
- 1998 - 2nd place (14 points +2)

=== Individual European Championship ===
- 2004 - 6th place (9 points)
- 2006 - European Champion (13 points +3)

=== European Pairs Championship ===
- 2007 - 2nd place (12 points)

=== Polish Pairs Speedway Championship ===
- 1998 - 3rd place

=== Polish Under-21 Pairs Championship ===
- 1998 - 2nd place

=== Polish Under-21 Team Championship ===
- 1998 - 2nd place

=== Silver Helmet (U-21) ===
- 1998 - 3rd place

== See also ==
- Poland national speedway team
