= Freddie Eriksson =

Swedish motorcycle speedway rider

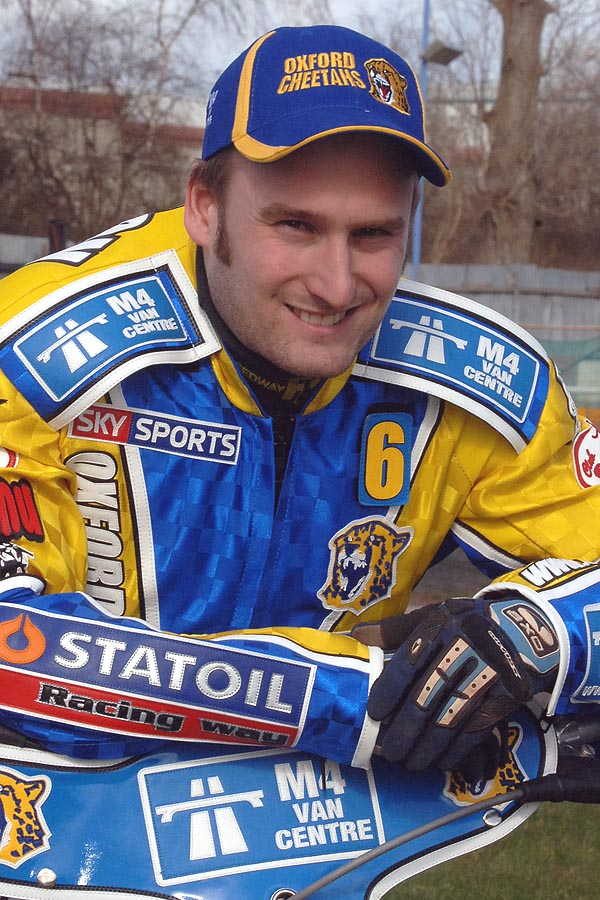
- Eriksson in 2007
- Born: 23 April 1981 (age 45); Stockholm, Sweden
- Nationality: Swedish

Career history

Sweden
- 1997–2000, 2009: Getingarna
- 1999–2003: Rospiggarna
- 2004–2008, 2013: Hammarby
- 2008, 2010: Griparna

Great Britain
- 2001, 2002: King's Lynn Stars
- 2003: Ipswich Witches
- 2005, 2006, 2007: Oxford Cheetahs
- 2008: Poole Pirates

Poland
- 2003: Gdańsk
- 2005-2010: Łódź

Denmark
- 2008: Grindsted

Individual honours
- 2002: Swedish U21 champion

Team honours
- 2008: Elite League Champion
- 2001, 2002: Elitserien

Freddie Ove Eriksson (born 23 April 1981 in Stockholm, Sweden) is a former motorcycle speedway rider from Sweden. He earned one cap for the Sweden national speedway team.

== Career ==
Eriksson began his British speedway career in 2001 with King's Lynn with whom he had two relatively successful seasons scoring over 400 points in 71 appearances. In between he became the Swedish Under-21 Speedway Champion in 2002.

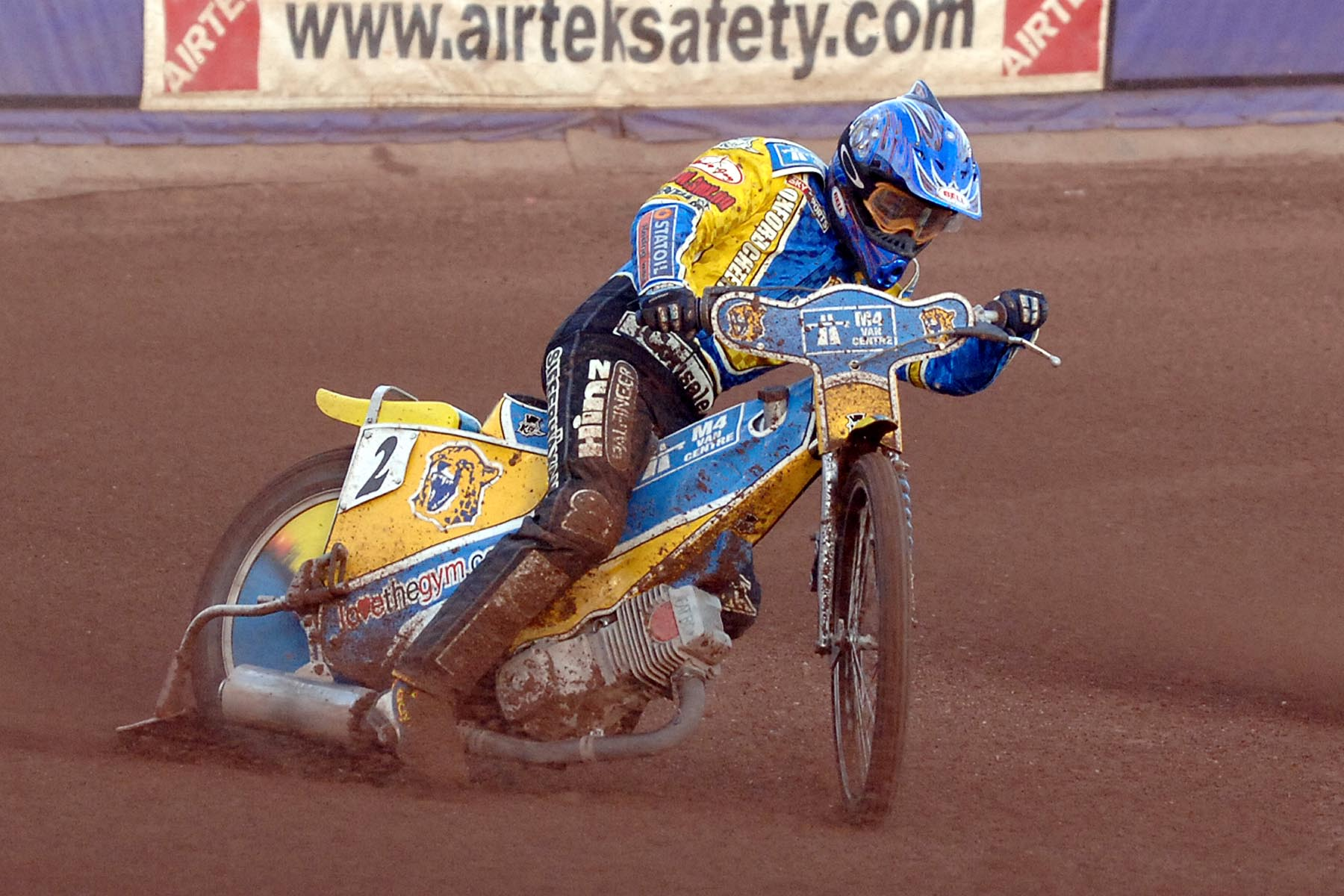
Eriksson riding for Oxford

In 2003, Eriksson joined Ipswich on loan late on in the season and made only 14 appearances. Eriksson's parent club (Oxford) recalled him for the end of the 2005 season but at the start of the 2006 season Eriksson was released after only 13 meetings. Eriksson started the 2007 season back at Oxford but once again he was unable to complete a full season in the UK after Oxford were forced to close down their Elite League team at the end of May due to financial problems.

Eriksson did not expect to ride in the British Elite League in 2008 due to losing a large amount of money when Oxford were forced to shut down. However, after Poole were unable to sign Craig Watson due to an administrative error, they signed Eriksson on loan from the British Speedway Promoters' Association (BSPA) who had ownership of his contract after Oxford closed down. He signed in January 2008 on an average of 3.06 which he obtained in 2006 as Oxford's 2007 results were expunged from the records.

On the 8 April 2008, Poole signed Eriksson on a permanent deal from the BSPA. Eriksson won the Elite League Championship with Poole but was not retained the following season.

Eriksson spent six seasons in Poland with Łódź from 2005 to 2010.

== World Final appearances ==
=== World U-21 Championship ===
- 2000 - POL Gorzów Wielkopolski - 15th
- 2001 - GBR Peterborough - 10th
- 2002 - CZE Slaný - 4th

== Speedway Grand Prix results ==
2002 Speedway Grand Prix Final Championship standings (Riding No 24)
Race no.	Grand Prix	Pos.	Pts.	Heats	Draw No
5 /10	(Sweden) Swedish SGP	20th	3	-	24

permanent speedway rider
wild card, track reserve or qualified reserve
rider not classified (track reserve who did not start)
