= 2002 Speedway World Cup =

43rd edition of the annual motorcycle speedway World Cup competition

Speedway World Cup
- Venues: Arlington Stadium; East of England Showground; Poole Stadium; Sheffield Sports Stadium
- Location: England
- Start date: 4 August
- End date: 10 August
- Nations: 12

Champions
- Australia

The 2002 Speedway World Cup (SWC) was the 2nd FIM Speedway World Cup season. The final took place on 10 August 2002 in Peterborough, England. The tournament was won by Australia (64 points) and they beat Denmark (58 pts), Sweden (54 pts), Poland (48 pts) and Czech Republic (36 pts) in the Final.

== Qualification ==
- Qualifying round
- 20 May 2002
- (Germany) Motorstadion, Abensberg

Pos.	National team	Pts.
1	Germany	49
2	Slovenia	46
3	Latvia	17
4	Austria	8

== Main tournament ==
=== Qualifying rounds ===
Main article: 2002 Speedway World Cup Event 1
- Event 1
- 4 August 2002
- (England) Owlerton Stadium, Sheffield
- only 20 heats

Pos.	National team	Pts.
1	Australia	46
2	Great Britain	42
3	Czech Republic	28
4	Germany	9

Main article: 2002 Speedway World Cup Event 3
- Event 3
- 6 August 2002
- (England) Arlington Stadium, Eastbourne

Pos.	National team	Pts.
1	Poland	57
2	United States	49
3	Russia	24
4	Slovenia	19

Main article: 2002 Speedway World Cup Event 2
- Event 2
- 5 August 2002
- (England) Wimborne Road, Poole

Pos.	National team	Pts.
1	Sweden	55
2	Denmark	41
3	Finland	32
4	Hungary	19

=== Race-off ===
- Race-Off
- 8 August 2002 (only 22 heats)
- East of England Showground, Peterborough

Pos.	National team	Pts.
1	Czech Republic	54
2	Denmark	51
3	United States	51
4	Great Britain	49
5	Finland	19

==== Heat details ====
Placing	Team / Rider Name	Total	1	2	3	4	5	6	7	8	9	10	11	12	13	14	15	16	17	18	19	20	21	22	23	24	25
1	Czech Republic	54	0	3	7	10	12	13	17	17	21	24	27	29	32	35	38	41	42	42	45	48	51	54	54	54	54
1	(1) Tomáš Topinka	10	0					1					3					3					3
1	(2) Aleš Dryml, Jr.	13		3					4					2					1					3
1	(3) Bohumil Brhel	7			4					0					3					X
1	(4) Lukáš Dryml	13				3					4					3					3
1	(5) Antonín Kasper, Jr.	11					2					3					3					3
2	Denmark	51	4	5	7	8	12	12	15	19	22	22	24	28	32	34	38	39	43	44	46	50	51	51	51	51	51
2	(1) Nicki Pedersen	15	4								3				4							4		F
2	(2) Charlie Gjedde	4		1								E				2		1
2	(3) Hans N. Andersen	10			2			0									4		4
2	(4) Ronni Pedersen	7				1			3				2							1
2	(5) Bjarne Pedersen	15					4			4				4							2		1
3	United States	51	3	7	10	10	11	15	16	18	20	24	24	27	29	30	30	38	38	41	45	47	47	51	51	51	51
3	(1) Billy Hamill	13	3									4		3						3
3	(2) Greg Hancock	22		4				4							2			8J			4
3	(3) Ryan Fisher	7			3				1							1						2	0
3	(4) Brent Werner	6				0				2							0	-						4
3	(5) Billy Janniro	3					1				2		0						X
4	Great Britain	49	1	3	4	8	11	14	14	17	18	20	24	25	26	30	32	34	37	41	42	43	47	49	49	49	49
4	(1) Gary Havelock	4	1						E								2				1
4	(2) Joe Screen	10		2						3			4									1
4	(3) Sean Wilson	5			1						1			1				2
4	(4) Carl Stonehewer	14				4						2			1				3				4
4	(5) Lee Richardson	16					3	3								4				4				2
5	Finland	19	2	2	2	4	4	6	8	9	9	10	11	11	11	11	12	12	14	16	16	16	18	19	19	19	19
5	(1) Kaj Laukkanen	5	2							1						T			2
5	(2) Tomi Reima	5		0							0						1			2			2
5	(3) Kauko Nieminen	3			E							1	1								0			1
5	(4) Joonas Kylmäkorpi	4				2		2						0				0				0
5	(5) Toni Salmela	2					0		2						0			-
Placing	Team / Rider Name	Total	1	2	3	4	5	6	7	8	9	10	11	12	13	14	15	16	17	18	19	20	21	22	23	24	25

M - exclusion for exceeding two minute time allowance • T - exclusion for touching the tapes • X - other exclusion • E - retired or mechanical failure • F - fell

Helmet colours was permanent for each teams (Red, Blue, White, Yellow/Black and Green). Colours in diagrams means gate positions:
gate A – inside	gate B	gate C	gate D	gate E – outside

=== Final ===
The 2002 Speedway World Cup Final took place on 10 August 2002 at the East of England Showground in Peterborough, England. The referee was Marek Wojaczek.

==== Result ====
Pos.	National team	Pts.
1	Australia	64
2	Denmark	58
3	Sweden	54
4	Poland	48
5	Czech Republic	36

==== Heat details ====
Placing	Team / Rider Name	Total	1	2	3	4	5	6	7	8	9	10	11	12	13	14	15	16	17	18	19	20	21	22	23	24	25
1	Australia	64	3	3	7	9	12	15	15	18	22	24	25	26	29	32	36	40	40	44	47	51	53	55	58	60	64
1	(1) Todd Wiltshire	13	3					3					1					4					2
1	(2) Jason Lyons	3		T					0					1					X					2
1	(3) Leigh Adams	17			4					3					3					4					3
1	(4) Jason Crump	14				2					4					3					3					2
1	(5) Ryan Sullivan	17					3					2					4					4					4
2	Denmark	58	2	2	4	4	6	10	14	16	16	17	23	26	30	32	34	34	36	38	40	41	44	47	51	55	58
2	(1) Nicki Pedersen	14	2							2						2			2					3			3
2	(2) Ronni Pedersen	7		X							0						2			2			3
2	(3) Charlie Gjedde	5			2							1	-								2			-
2	(4) Hans N. Andersen	12				0		4						3								1			4
2	(5) Bjarne Pedersen	20					2		4				6J		4			0								4
3	Sweden	54	1	4	7	10	14	16	19	20	22	25	27	27	29	29	30	33	36	37	37	43	44	48	49	52	54
3	(1) Tony Rickardsson	15	1								2				2							6J		4
3	(2) Niklas Klingberg	10		3								3				E		3							1
3	(3) Peter Karlsson	13			3			2									1		3				1			3
3	(4) Mikael Karlsson	11				3			3				2							1							2
3	(5) Stefan Andersson	5					4			1				0							E		-
4	Poland	48	0	4	4	8	9	9	11	15	18	22	26	30	31	32	35	36	37	37	38	40	44	46	46	47	48
4	(1) Piotr Protasiewicz	6	0						2								3				1				E
4	(2) Tomasz Gollob	17		4						4			4									2		2J		1
4	(3) Krzysztof Cegielski	9			0						3			4				1									1
4	(4) Jarosław Hampel	14				4						4			1				1				4
4	(5) Grzegorz Walasek	2					1	0								1				0				-
5	Czech Republic	36	4	6	7	8	8	9	10	10	11	11	11	13	13	17	17	19	27	30	34	34	34	34	36	36	36
5	(1) Aleš Dryml, Jr.	13	4									0		2						3	4					0
5	(2) Tomáš Topinka	3		2				1							0						-						0
5	(3) Lukáš Dryml	14			1				1							4			8J			E	0
5	(4) Bohumil Brhel	5				1				T							E	2						-	2
5	(5) Antonín Kasper, Jr.	1					0				1		0						-					0	-
Placing	Team / Rider Name	Total	1	2	3	4	5	6	7	8	9	10	11	12	13	14	15	16	17	18	19	20	21	22	23	24	25

M - exclusion for exceeding two minute time allowance • T - exclusion for touching the tapes • X - other exclusion • E - retired or mechanical failure • F - fell

Helmet colours was permanent for each teams (Red, Blue, White, Yellow/Black and Green). Colours in diagrams means gate positions:
gate A – inside	gate B	gate C	gate D	gate E – outside

== Final classification ==
Pos.	National team	Pts.
Gold	Australia	64
Silver	Denmark	58
Bronze	Sweden	54
4	Poland	48
5	Czech Republic	36
6	United States	51
7	Great Britain	49
8	Finland	19
9	Russia	24
10	Hungary	19
11	Slovenia	19
12	Germany	9
