= Niklas Klingberg =

Swedish motorcycle speedway rider (born 1973)

- Born: 6 February 1973 (age 53)
- Nationality: Swedish

Career history

Sweden
- 1989–2000: Örnarna
- 2001: Indianerna
- 2002: Masarna
- 2004: Piraterna
- 2005–2006: Vargarna

Poland
- 1998: WTS Wrocław
- 1999, 2001, 2008: GTŻ Grudziądz
- 2000: Kolejarz Opole
- 2002: Unia Leszno
- 2003, 2006–2007: Stal Gorzów Wielkopolski
- 2004: KM Ostrów Wielkopolski
- 2005: Stal Rzeszów

Great Britain
- 1994–1996, 1998: Belle Vue Aces
- 2001: King's Lynn Stars
- 2003: Oxford Cheetahs

Denmark
- 2005: Holsted

Individual honours
- 1993: Swedish U21 champion
- 2000: Intercontinental Champion
- 2002: Swedish Champion

Team honours
- 1992, 1993, 1994, 1996: Swedish Elitserien Winner

Niklas Johan Borje Klingberg (born 6 February 1973) is a Swedish former motorcycle speedway rider. He earned 11 caps for the Sweden national speedway team.

== Career ==
Klingberg was a member of Sweden team at Speedway World Cups. He was Swedish Champion in 2002.

Klingberg rode in the British leagues from 1994 to 2003, starting with Belle Vue Aces from 1994 to 1996 and again in 1998. He then rode for King's Lynn Stars in 2001 and Oxford Cheetahs in 2003.

== Career details ==
=== World Championships ===
- Individual World Championship and Speedway Grand Prix
  - 2001 - 10th place (54 pts)
  - 2002 - 18th place (37 pts)
- Team World Championship (Speedway World Team Cup and Speedway World Cup)
  - 1996 - 5th place - (14pts)
  - 2001 - (Poland) Wrocław - 3rd place (10 pts)
  - 2002 - (England) Peterborough - 3rd place (10 pts)
- Individual U-21 World Championship
  - 1991 - (England) Coventry - 7th place (8 pts)
  - 1992 - (Germany) Pfaffenhofen - 7th place (9 pts)
  - 1993 - (Czech Republic) Pardubice - 11th place (7 pts)

=== European Championships ===
- Individual European Championship
  - 2004 - (Denmark) Holsted - 9th place (6 pts)

== Family ==
Klingberg's father Börje is also a former Swedish international speedway rider.

== See also ==
- Sweden national speedway team
- List of Speedway Grand Prix riders
