= Matej Ferjan =

Slovenian-Hungarian speedway rider (1977–2011)

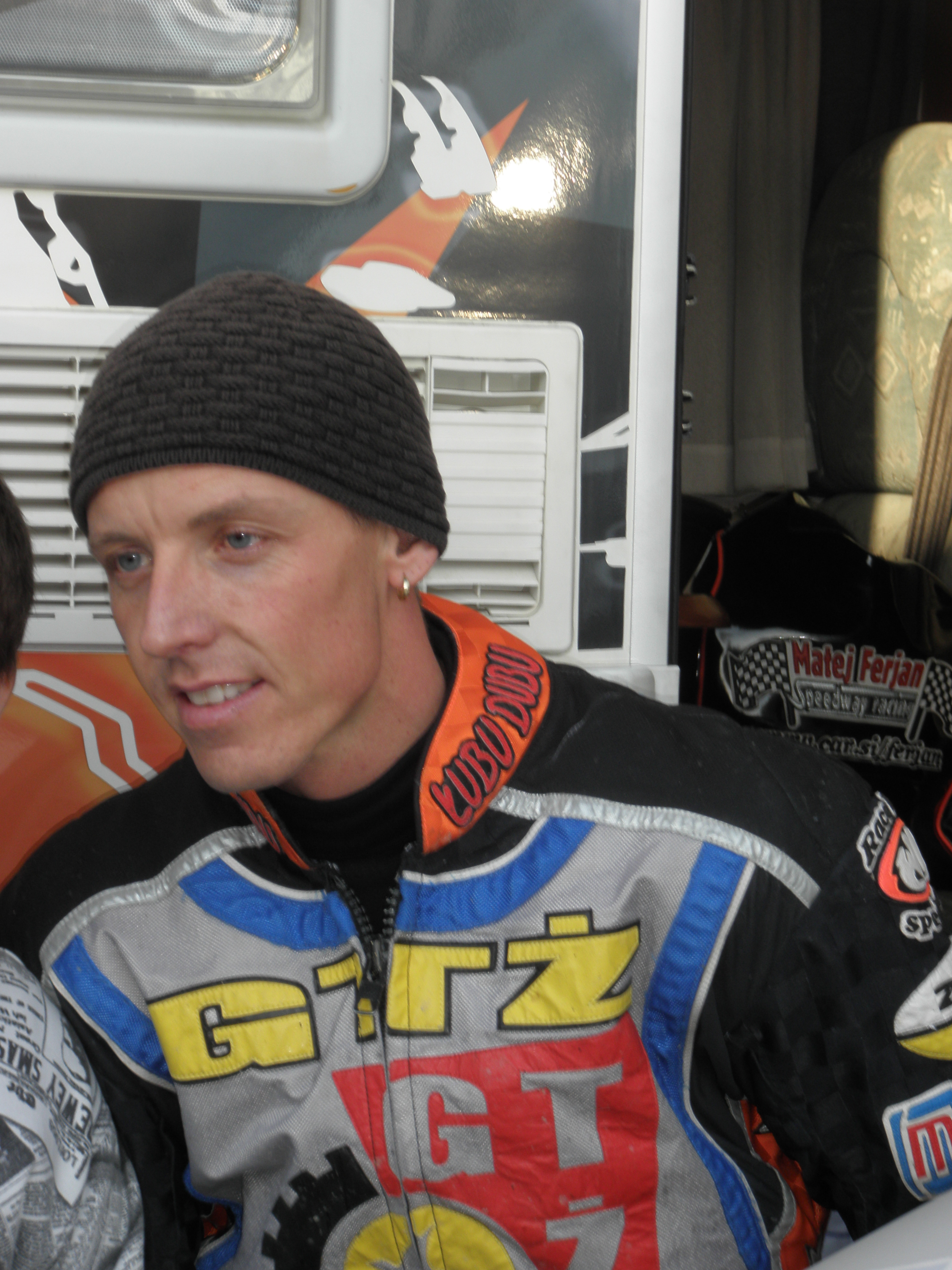
- Born: 5 January 1977; Ljubljana, Slovenia
- Died: 22 May 2011 (aged 34)
- Nationality: Slovenian

Career history

Poland
- 1998–1999: Grudziądz
- 2000: Zielona Góra
- 2001: Częstochowa
- 2002: Opole
- 2003–2004, 2006: Ostrów
- 2005: Krosno
- 2007–2008: Gorzów

Great Britain
- 1998, 2001, 2002: Belle Vue Aces
- 1999, 2004, 2005: Poole Pirates
- 2000: Ipswich Witches
- 2001: Peterborough Panthers
- 2003: Oxford Cheetahs
- 2011: Newcastle Diamonds

Denmark
- 2001: Slangerup
- 2007: Holstebro

Sweden
- 2000–2004: Västervik
- 2007: Indianerna

Individual honours
- 2000: Continental Champion
- 1997, 1998, 1999 2000, 2001: Slovenian champion
- 2003, 2004, 2006 2007, 2008, 2009: Hungarian Champion
- 2007: Criterium of Aces

Team honours
- 2004: Elite League Champion
- 2004: Elite League Knockout Cup

Matej Ferjan (5 January 1977 – 22 May 2011) was a Slovenian motorcycle speedway rider. He earned 8 caps for the Slovenia national speedway team and 2 caps for the Hungary national speedway team.

== Career ==
Ferjan was born in Ljubljana, Slovenia. He was a five-time Slovenian Individual Speedway Championship winner (1997, 1998, 1999, 2000, 2001) and a six-time Hungarian champion (2003, 2004, 2006, 2007, 2008, 2009).

In 1998, Ferjan won a third place in Individual U-21 World Championship. That same year, he made his British leagues debut with Belle Vue Aces.

On 9 July 2000, Ferjan won the Continental Final, which formed part of the 2001 Speedway Grand Prix Qualification. He then secured a permanent ride in the 2001 and 2002 Speedway Grand Prixs.

In 2004, Ferjan was second in the Individual European Championship, the same year that the BSPA blocked his transfer to Newcastle Diamonds He would however ride for Newcastle seven years later.

Ferjan was also the second non Polish rider after Rune Holta to win the Polish Criterium of Aces, winning in 2007.

== Death ==
On 22 May 2011, Ferjan was found dead in his van at the apartment block where he lived in Gorzów Wielkopolski, Poland. His cause of death has been attributed to a blood clot in his leg.

== Family ==
Ferjan had a son, Mark, born on 19 April 2004, and a daughter, Victoria.

== See also ==
- Slovenia national speedway team
- Hungary national speedway team
- List of Speedway Grand Prix riders
