= 2005 European Speedway Club Champions' Cup =

European motorcycle speedway event

European Speedway Club Champions' Cup
- Start date: 17 July
- End date: 18 September

The 2005 European Speedway Club Champions' Cup was the eighth motorcycle speedway championship for clubs competing in Europe. It was organised by the European Motorcycle Union (UEM). The competition was primarily for Eastern European teams and only featured Polish teams from three of the 'Big four' leagues, with the British, Swedish and Danish leagues choosing not to compete.

Mega-Lada Togliatti won the championship for the third time.

== Qualifying ==
- Lokomotive Daugavpils qualified for the final
- 17 July 2005
- (Ukraine) Rivne Speedway Stadium, Rivne

Pos.	Team	Pts.	Scorers
1	(Latvia) Lokomotive Daugavpils	37	Simon Vlasov 13, Kjasts Puodžuks 10, Denis Gizatullin 7, Andrejs Koroļevs 6, Denis Saifutdinov 1
2	(Ukraine) Rivne Speedway	36	Bohumil Brhel 12, Igor Marko 9, László Szatmári 6, Wołodymyr Kołodij 5, Andriy Karpov 4
3	(Hungary) Simon & Wolf Debrecen	26	Sándor Tihanyi 11, Matej Ferjan 8, Norbert Magosi 5, Tomasz Rempała 2
4	(Germany) RG Parchim/Wolfslake	21	Christian Hefenbrock 8, Mathias Schultz 5, Joachim Kugelmann 4, Daniel Rath 3, Alexander Lieschke 1

== Final ==
No representatives from Slovenia and the Czech Republic (replaced by select teams).

- 18 September 2005
- (Russia) Anatoly Stepanov Stadium, Tolyatti

Pos.	Team	Pts.	Scorers
1	(Russia) Mega-Lada Togliatti	72	Leigh Adams 20, Andreas Jonsson 20, Lee Richardson 19, Oleg Kurguskin 13, Sergey Darkin 0
2	(Latvia) Lokomotive Daugavpils	63	Simon Vlasov 21, Denis Gizatullin 15, Kjasts Puodžuks 11, Robert Mikołajczak 10, Sławomir Dudek 6
3	(Russia) Russian select team	47	Renat Gafurov 19, Vladimir Dubinin 11, Evgeny Gomozov 10, Ilya Bondarenko 7, Eduard Shaihullin 0
4	(Ukraine) Ukrainian select team	46	Igor Marko 15, László Szatmári 11, Wiktor Hajdym 11, Vladimir Trofimov 9, Andriy Karpov 0
5	(Poland) Unia Tarnów	19	Stanisław Burza 12, Grzegorz Wardzała 4, Marek Mróz 3, Kamil Zieliński 1, Grzegorz Dzik 0
