= 1998 European Speedway Club Champions' Cup =

European motorcycle speedway event

European Speedway Club Champions' Cup
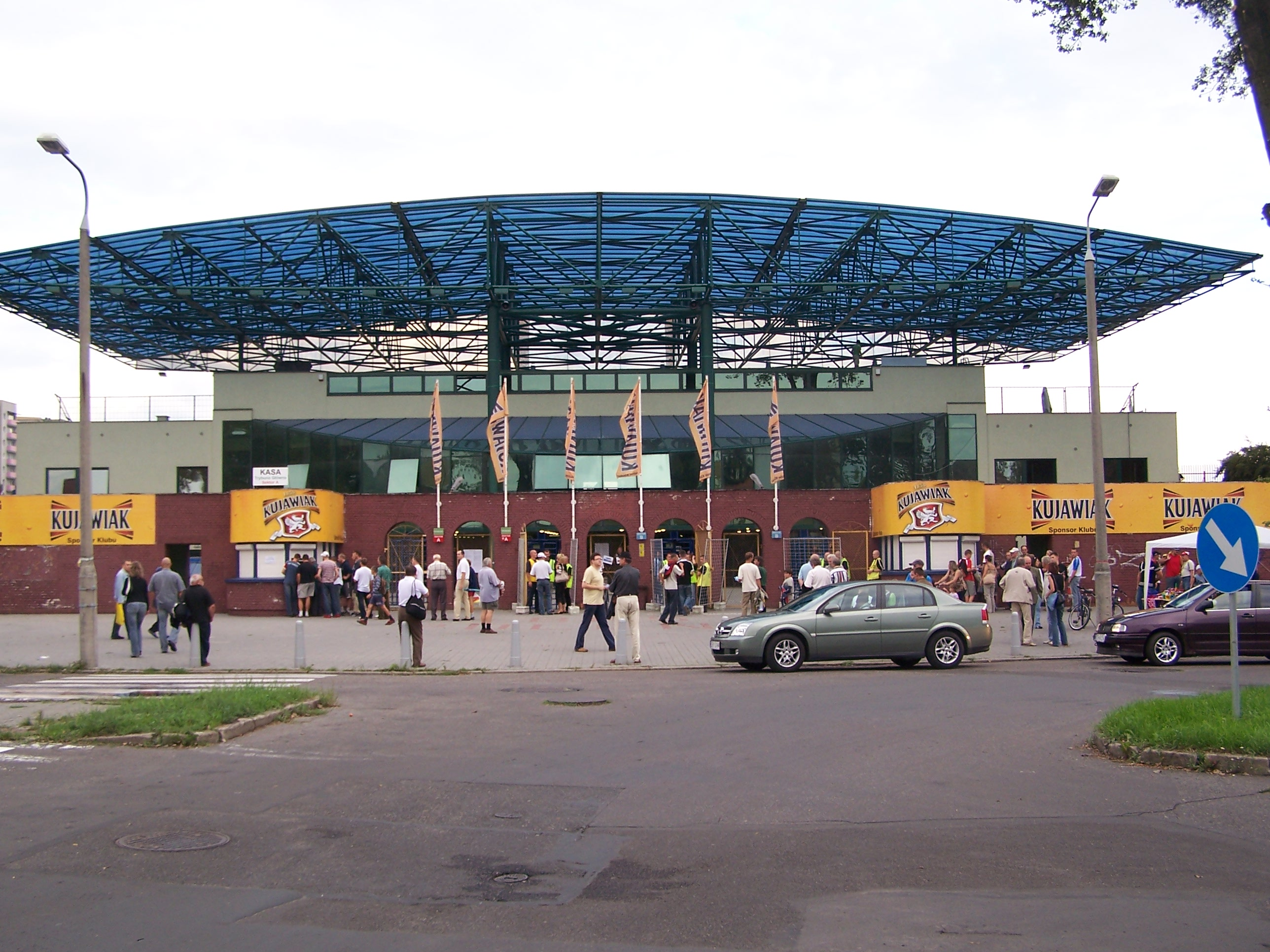
- The Polonia Bydgoszcz Stadium hosted the inaugural final
- Start date: 17 May
- End date: 1 October

The 1998 European Speedway Club Champions' Cup was the inaugural motorcycle speedway championship for clubs competing in Europe. It was organised by the European Motorcycle Union (UEM) and featured 14 countries, although it only featured Poland from three of the 'Big four' leagues, with the British, Swedish and Danish leagues choosing not to compete.

Polonia Bydgoszcz comfortably won the first championship, assisted by the fact that the final was held at their home stadium.

== Qualifying ==
=== Round 1 ===
Due to lack of an organiser for the scheduled Group C event, Bulgaria and France dropped out and Ukraine moved to round 2.

=== Round 2 ===
SC Rivne qualified for round 3

- 17 May 1998
- (Ukraine) Rivne Speedway Stadium, Rivne

Pos.	Team	Pts.	Scorers
1	(Ukraine) SC Rivne	46	Igor Marko 12, Aleksandr Lyatosinsky 12, Vladimir Trofimov 11, Vladimir Kolody 11
2	(Italy) Motoclub Olimpia	36	Stefano Alfonso 14, Armando Castagna 12, Alessandro Dalla Valle 5, Stefano Tadiello 5
3	(Hungary) Hajdu Volan SC	22	Laszlo Bodi 8, Norbert Magosi 5, Zsolt Bencze 5, Laszlo Szatmari 4
4	(Austria) SC Remus Potzneusiedl	15	Andreas Bossner 11, Sandor Tihanyi 3, Ivan Nagar 1, Tomas Stadler 0

=== Round 3 ===
Lukoil Oktyabrsky qualified for final

- 21 June 1998
- (Slovenia) Ilirija Sports Park, Ljubljana

Placing	Team / Rider name	Total	1	2	3	4	5	6	7	8	9	10	11	12	13	14	15	16	Pts	17	18	19	20
1	(Russia) Lukoil Oktyabrsky	49	3	6	7	7	10	13	16	19	21	24	27	30	32	34	37	39		42	44	46	49
1	(5) (Russia) Rinat Mardanshin	13	3					3					3					2	11			2
1	(6) (Russia) Eduard Shaihullin	0		-			-							-			-		0				-
1	(7) (Russia) Mikhail Starostin	10				X			3			3				2			8		2
1	(8) (Russia) Talgat Galeev	11			1					3	2				2				8	3
1	(18) (Russia) Roman Povazhny	15		3			3							3			3		12				3
2	(Slovenia) AMTK Ljubljana	38	2	4	7	8	9	11	11	13	16	18	20	22	25	28	29	32		32	33	36	38
2	(13) (Slovenia) Matej Ferjan	11		2					X		3							3	8			3
2	(14) (Slovenia) Jernej Kolenko	7	2							2		2					1		7	0
2	(15) (Slovenia) Izak Šantej	12			3			2						2		3			10				2
2	(16) (Slovenia) Ales Dolinar	8				1	1						2		3				7		1
2	(20) -	0																	0
3	(Ukraine) SC Rivne	19	1	1	1	3	5	5	7	7	8	9	10	10	11	11	13	13		15	18	19	19
3	(9) (Ukraine) Igor Marko	6			0		2					1						0	3		3
3	(10) (Ukraine) Aleksandr Lyatosinsky	5				2		0			1						2		5				T
3	(11) (Ukraine) Vladimir Trofimov	3		0						0			1			0			1	2
3	(12) (Ukraine) Vladimir Kolody	5	1						2					E	1				4			1
3	(19) -	0																	0
4	(Latvia) Lokomotiv Daugavpils	13	0	1	3	6	6	7	7	8	8	8	8	9	9	10	10	11		12	12	12	13
4	(1) (Latvia) Nikolay Kokin	7				3				1				1				1	6				1
4	(2) (Latvia) Vladimir Voronkov	2			2				F				-				-		2
4	(3) (Latvia) Aleksandr Biznya	2		1				1				E			0				2		0
4	(4) (Latvia) Maksim Andreev	2	0				0				0					1			1	1
4	(17) -	0																	0
Placing	Team / Rider name	Total	1	2	3	4	5	6	7	8	9	10	11	12	13	14	15	16	Pts	17	18	19	20

M - exclusion for exceeding two-minute time allowance • T - exclusion for touching the tapes • X - other exclusion • E - retired or mechanical failure • F - fell

Helmet colours were permanent for each team (Red, Blue, White and Yellow/Black). Colours in diagrams indicate gate positions:
gate A – inside	gate B	gate C	gate D – outside

== Final ==
- 23 August 1998
- (Poland) Polonia Bydgoszcz Stadium, Bydgoszcz

Placing	Team / Rider name	Total	1	2	3	4	5	6	7	8	9	10	11	12	13	14	15	16	Pts	17	18	19	20
1	(Poland) Polonia Bydgoszcz	46	3	6	6	9	12	15	16	18	21	24	25	28	28	31	34	37		38	40	43	46
1	(1) (Poland) Tomasz Gollob	14				3				2				3				3	11			3
1	(2) (Poland) Jacek Gollob	6			E				1				1				3		5	1
1	(3) (Poland) Piotr Protasiewicz	11		3				3				3			-				9		2
1	(4) (Sweden) Henrik Gustafsson	15	3				3				3					3			12				3
1	(17) (Poland) Michał Robacki	0													0				0
2	(Czech Republic) Olymp Prague	36	0	2	5	7	8	9	12	15	17	19	22	24	25	26	28	30		32	32	34	36
2	(13) (Czech Republic) Antonín Šváb Jr.	11		2					3		2							2	9				2
2	(14) (Czech Republic) Bohumil Brhel	9	0							3		2					2		7			2
2	(15) (Czech Republic) Zdeněk Schneiderwind	7			3			1						2		1			7	-
2	(16) (Czech Republic) Adrian Rymel	7				2	1						3		1				7		-
2	(20) (Czech Republic) Pavel Ondrašík	2																	0	2	0
3	(Russia) Lukoil Oktyabrsky	29	2	2	4	4	6	8	10	11	12	13	15	16	19	21	22	23		26	27	28	29
3	(9) (Russia) Rinat Mardanshin	7			2		2					1						1	6				1
3	(10) (Russia) Mikhail Starostin	5				0		2			1						1		4		1
3	(11) (Russia) Talgat Galeev	6		E						1			2			2			5			1
3	(12) (Russia) Flyur Kalimullin	0																	0
3	(19) (Poland) Sebastian Ułamek	11	2						2					1	3				8	3
4	(Germany) MSC Brokstedt	9	1	2	3	4	4	4	4	4	4	4	4	4	6	6	6	6		6	9	9	9
4	(5) (Germany) Matthias Kröger	1	1					E					0					0	1	E
4	(6) (Denmark) Frede Schött	4		1			0							0			-		1		3
4	(7) (Germany) Hartmud Balfanz	1				1			0			0				0			1			0
4	(8) (Germany) Aksel Jepsen	3			1					0	-				2				3				0
4	(18) (Germany) Stephan Katt	0									0						0		0
Placing	Team / Rider name	Total	1	2	3	4	5	6	7	8	9	10	11	12	13	14	15	16	Pts	17	18	19	20

M - exclusion for exceeding two-minute time allowance • T - exclusion for touching the tapes • X - other exclusion • E - retired or mechanical failure • F - fell

Helmet colours were permanent for each team (Red, Blue, White and Yellow/Black). Colours in diagrams indicate gate positions:
gate A – inside	gate B	gate C	gate D – outside
