= 2009 European Speedway Club Champions' Cup =

European motorcycle speedway event

European Speedway Club Champions' Cup
- Start date: 18 July
- End date: 19 September

The 2009 European Speedway Club Champions' Cup was the 12th motorcycle speedway championship for clubs competing in Europe. It was organised by the European Motorcycle Union (UEM). The competition was primarily for Eastern European teams and only featured Polish teams from three of the 'Big four' leagues, with the British, Swedish and Danish leagues choosing not to compete.

Kaskad Rivne won the championship.

== Summary ==
- Qualifying
- (Ukraine) Rivne
- 18 July 2009

Pos.	Club	Pts.
1	(Ukraine) Kaskad Rivne	50
2	(Hungary) Simon & Wolf Debrecen	32
3	(Ukraine) SKA Lviv	24
4	(Latvia) Lokomotiv Daugavpils	13

- Final
- (Poland) Toruń
- 19 September 2009

Pos.	Club	Pts.
1	(Ukraine) Kaskad Rivne	38
2	(Poland) Unibax Toruń	37
3	(Russia) Vostok Vladivostok	34
4	(Hungary) Simon & Wolf Debrecen	11

== Qualifying ==
Kaskad Rivne and Simon & Wolf Debrecen qualified for the final.

- 18 July 2009 (16:30 UTC+3)
- (Ukraine) Rivnenskyy Mototrek, Rivne
- Referee: P. Vana

Placing	Team / Rider name	Total	1	2	3	4	5	6	7	8	9	10	11	12	13	14	15	16	Pts	17	18	19	20
1	(Ukraine) Kaskad Rivne	50	0	3	4	7	10	11	14	17	20	22	25	28	31	32	35	38		41	44	47	50
1	(13) Daniel Jeleniewski	15		3					3		3							3	12			3
1	(14) Ilya Bondarenko	11	0							3		2					3		8		3
1	(15) Oleksandr Borodaj	9			1			1						3		1			6	3
1	(16) Grzegorz Walasek	15				3	3						3		3				12				3
1	(20) Wołodymir Kołodij, Sr.	0																	0
2	(Hungary) Simon & Wolf Debrecen	32	1	2	5	6	8	8	10	12	13	16	17	19	19	22	22	24		26	28	30	32
2	(9) Matej Ferjan	10			3		2					3						2	10				-
2	(10) József Tabaka	4				1		0			1						-		2		2
2	(11) Maciej Kuciapa	9		1						2			1			3			7			2
2	(12) Sándor Tihanyi	1	1						-					-	E				1	-
2	(19) Paweł Miesiąc	8							2					2			E		4	2			2
3	(Ukraine) SKA Lviv	24	2	4	6	8	8	11	12	13	13	13	13	14	16	18	20	21		22	23	24	24
3	(1) Daniil Ivanov	5				2				1				1				1	5				E
3	(2) Władimir Dubinin	6			2				1				0				2		5			1
3	(3) Grzegorz Zengota	5		2				3				Fx			-				5	-
3	(4) Andriej Karpow	5	2				0				T					2			4		1
3	(17) Kirył Cukanow	3													2				2	1
4	(Latvia) Lokomotiv Daugavpils	13	3	3	3	3	4	6	6	6	8	8	10	10	11	11	12	12		12	12	12	13
4	(5) Vjačeslavs Giruckis	8	3					2					2					0	7				1
4	(6) Leonid Paura	2		0			1							0			1		2		E
4	(7) Robert Mikołajczak	0				0			0			X				E			0	X
4	(8) Marcin Nowaczyk	3			E					0	2				1				3			E
Placing	Team / Rider name	Total	1	2	3	4	5	6	7	8	9	10	11	12	13	14	15	16	Pts	17	18	19	20

M - exclusion for exceeding two-minute time allowance • T - exclusion for touching the tapes • X - other exclusion • E - retired or mechanical failure • F - fell

Helmet colours were permanent for each team (Red, Blue, White and Yellow/Black). Colours in diagrams indicate gate positions:
gate A – inside	gate B	gate C	gate D – outside

== Final ==
- 19 September 2009 (19:00 UTC+2)
- (Poland) Toruń, MotoArena Toruń
- Referee: Frank Ziegler/ Jury President: Christer Bergstrom

Placing	Team / Rider name	Total	1	2	3	4	5	6	7	8	9	10	11	12	13	14	15	16	Pts	17	18	19	20
1	(Ukraine) Kaskad Rivne	38	2	4	5	7	10	11	13	16	17	20	21	22	25	27	29	31		33	33	36	38
1	(5) Grzegorz Walasek	8	2					1					1					2	6	2
1	(6) Rafał Dobrucki	8		2			3							1			2		8		0
1	(7) Rafał Okoniewski	11				2			2			3				2			9				2
1	(8) Krzysztof Kasprzak	11			1					3	1				3				8			3
1	(18) Oleksandr Borodai	0																	0
2	(Poland) Unibax Toruń	37	3	6	9	10	11	14	17	17	20	20	23	25	25	26	29	30		33	35	36	37
2	(9) Wiesław Jaguś	5			3		1					0						1	5		-
2	(10) Adrian Miedziński	8				1		3			-						3		7			1
2	(11) Robert Kościecha	7		3						0			-			1			4	3
2	(12) Ryan Sullivan	8	3						3					2	0				8				-
2	(19) Matěj Kůs	9									3		3						6		2		1
3	(Russia) Vostok Vladivostok	34	1	1	3	6	8	10	10	12	14	16	18	21	23	26	26	29		29	32	34	34
3	(13) Artem Laguta	8		0					0		2							3	5		3
3	(14) None	0	-							-		-					-		0	-
3	(15) Denis Gizatullin	10			2			2						3		3			10				0
3	(16) Renat Gafurov	11				3	2						2		2				9			2
3	(20) Roman Povazhny	5	1							2		2					Fx		5	M
4	(Hungary) Simon & Wolf Debrecen	11	0	1	1	1	1	1	2	3	3	4	4	4	5	5	6	6		7	8	8	11
4	(1) Matej Ferjan	2				0				1				0				0	1		1
4	(2) József Tabaka	2			0				1				0				1		2			0
4	(3) Maciej Kuciapa	6		1				0				1			1				3				3
4	(4) Paweł Miesiąc	0	0				0				R					-			0	-
4	(17) Sándor Tihanyi	1														0			0	1
Placing	Team / Rider name	Total	1	2	3	4	5	6	7	8	9	10	11	12	13	14	15	16	Pts	17	18	19	20

M - exclusion for exceeding two-minute time allowance • T - exclusion for touching the tapes • X - other exclusion • E - retired or mechanical failure • F - fell

Helmet colours were permanent for each team (Red, Blue, White and Yellow/Black). Colours in diagrams indicate gate positions:
gate A – inside	gate B	gate C	gate D – outside

== See also ==
- motorcycle speedway
