= 2000 European Speedway Club Champions' Cup =

European motorcycle speedway event

European Speedway Club Champions' Cup
- Start date: 7 May
- End date: 10 September

The 2000 European Speedway Club Champions' Cup was the third motorcycle speedway championship for clubs competing in Europe. It was organised by the European Motorcycle Union (UEM). The competition was primarily for Eastern European teams and only featured Polish teams from three of the 'Big four' leagues, with the British, Swedish and Danish leagues choosing not to compete.

Polonia Piła won the championship.

== Qualifying ==
=== Stage 1 ===
Marmande Speedway were replaced by a second team from Signal Rivne. Simon & Wolf Motor Club from Debrecen qualified for stage 2.

- 7 May 2000
- (Ukraine) Rivne Speedway Stadium, Rivne

Pos.	Team	Pts.	Scorers
1	(Hungary) Simon & Wolf Debrecen	51	Sandor Tihanyi 15, Zoltan Adorjan 14, Laszlo Szatmari 11, Zsolt Bencze 11
2	(Ukraine) Signal Rivne	41	Vladimir Kolody 13, Vladimir Trofimov 11, Aleksandr Lyatosinsky 9, Aleksander Boroday 8
3	(Netherlands) Wings 2000	19	Eddie Turksema 5, Isak Jacob Mulder 5, Wiebo Bouwmeester 5, Martin Cazemier 4
4	(Ukraine) Signal Rivne 2	7	Anatoly Zhabchik 5, Roman Lozovicky 1, Valery Polyukhovich 1, Anatoly Kunedeus 0, Yury Kolesov 0

=== Stage 2 ===
A second team from Lokomotiv Daugavpils replaced AMTK Ljubljana. The Czech team ZK Pardubice qualified for the final.

- 11 June 2000
- (Latvia) Stadium Lokomotīve, Daugavpils

Placing	Team / Rider name	Total	1	2	3	4	5	6	7	8	9	10	11	12	13	14	15	16	Pts	17	18	19	20
1	(Czech Republic) AMK Pardubice	45	1	2	5	7	10	13	16	19	22	25	27	30	33	36	39	40		41	41	44	45
1	(13) (Czech Republic) Radek Smolik	2		1					-		-							1	2	-
1	(14) (Czech Republic) Michal Makovský	13	1							3		3					3		10			3
1	(15) (Czech Republic) Marian Jirout	13			3			3						3		3			12				1
1	(16) (Czech Republic) Jaroslav Petrak	10				2	3						2		3				10		F
1	(20) (Czech Republic) Václav Milík, Sr.	7							3		3								6	1
2	(Hungary) Simon & Wolf Debrecen	36	3	6	8	9	11	13	15	16	17	18	21	23	24	24	25	27		29	31	33	36
2	(9) (Hungary) Zoltan Adorjan	10			2		2					1						2	7				3
2	(10) (Hungary) Sandor Fekete	4				1		-			1						-		2	2
2	(11) (Hungary) Laszlo Szatmari	7		3						1			3			F			7			-
2	(12) (Hungary) Zolt Bencze	8	3						2					-	1				6		2
2	(19) (Hungary) Norbert Magosi	7						2						2			1		5			2
3	(Latvia) Lokomotiv Daugavpils	35	2	4	5	8	8	9	9	11	13	15	16	17	19	21	23	26		29	32	33	35
3	(1) (Latvia) Vladimir Voronkov	11				3				2				1				3	9				2
3	(2) (Latvia) Nikolay Kokin	7			1				E				1				2		4		3
3	(3) (Latvia) Aleksandr Biznya	8		2				1				2			2				7			1
3	(4) (Latvia) Vitaly Biznya	0																	0
3	(17) (Ukraine) Igor Marko	9	2				E				2					2			6	3
4	(Latvia) Lokomotiv Daugavpils B	3	0	0	0	0	1	1	2	2	2	2	2	2	2	3	3	3		3	3	3	3
4	(5) (Latvia) Denis Popovich	0	0					F					0					-	0
4	(6) (Latvia) Leonid Paura	1		0			1							0			E		1
4	(7) (Latvia) Stanislav Paura	2				0			1			0				1			2
4	(8) (Latvia) Aleksandrs Ivanovs	0			0					0	F				-				0
4	(18) -	0																	0
Placing	Team / Rider name	Total	1	2	3	4	5	6	7	8	9	10	11	12	13	14	15	16	Pts	17	18	19	20

M - exclusion for exceeding two-minute time allowance • T - exclusion for touching the tapes • X - other exclusion • E - retired or mechanical failure • F - fell

Helmet colours were permanent for each team (Red, Blue, White and Yellow/Black). Colours in diagrams indicate gate positions:
gate A – inside	gate B	gate C	gate D – outside

== Final ==
- 10 September 2000
- (Poland) Stadion Polonii Piła, Piła

Placing	Team / Rider name	Total	1	2	3	4	5	6	7	8	9	10	11	12	13	14	15	16	Pts	17	18	19	20
1	(Poland) Polonia Pila	56	3	6	9	11	14	17	20	23	26	27	30	33	36	39	42	45		48	50	53	56
1	(1) (Poland) Jacek Gollob	13				2				3				3				3	11		2
1	(2) (Poland) Jarosław Hampel	15			3				3				3				3		12			3
1	(3) (Poland) Rafał Dobrucki	13		3				3				1			3				10	3
1	(4) (England) Chris Louis	15	3				3				3					3			12				3
1	(17) (Poland) Robert Flis	0																	0
2	(Russia) Lukoil Oktyabrsky	28	1	3	4	5	7	8	9	10	12	14	15	17	17	19	21	22		23	26	27	28
2	(13) (Russia) Michail Starostin	5		2					1		-							1	4			1
2	(14) (Russia) Rinat Mardanshin	7	1							1		2					2		6				1
2	(15) (Russia) Talgat Galeev	3			1			1						-		-			2	1
2	(16) (Russia) Eduard Shaihullin	2				1	-						1				X		2		-
2	(20) (Poland) Piotr Świst	11					2				2			2		2			8		3
3	(Germany) AC Landshut	25	2	3	3	6	6	8	10	10	11	14	16	16	17	17	17	19		21	21	23	25
3	(5) (Germany) Robert Barth	10	2					2					2					2	8			2
3	(6) (Germany) Herbert Rudolph	3		1			0							0			0		1	2
3	(7) (Germany) Matthias Kröger	10				3			2			3				E			8				2
3	(8) (Germany) Martin Smolinski	2			0					0	1				1				2		0
3	(18) -	0																	0
4	(Czech Republic) AMK Pardubice	11	0	0	2	2	3	3	3	5	5	5	5	6	8	9	10	10		10	11	11	11
4	(9) (Czech Republic) Václav Milík, Sr.	3			2		1					E						-	3				0
4	(10) (Czech Republic) Radek Smolik	1				0		-			-						1		1	0
4	(11) (Czech Republic) Marian Jirout	3		0						2			0			1			3			0
4	(12) (Czech Republic) Michal Makovský	4	0						0					1	2				3		1
4	(19) (Czech Republic) Jaroslav Petrak	0						0			X							0	0
Placing	Team / Rider name	Total	1	2	3	4	5	6	7	8	9	10	11	12	13	14	15	16	Pts	17	18	19	20

M - exclusion for exceeding two-minute time allowance • T - exclusion for touching the tapes • X - other exclusion • E - retired or mechanical failure • F - fell

Helmet colours were permanent for each team (Red, Blue, White and Yellow/Black). Colours in diagrams indicate gate positions:
gate A – inside	gate B	gate C	gate D – outside
