= Simon Vlasov =

Russian motorcycle speedway rider (born 1981)

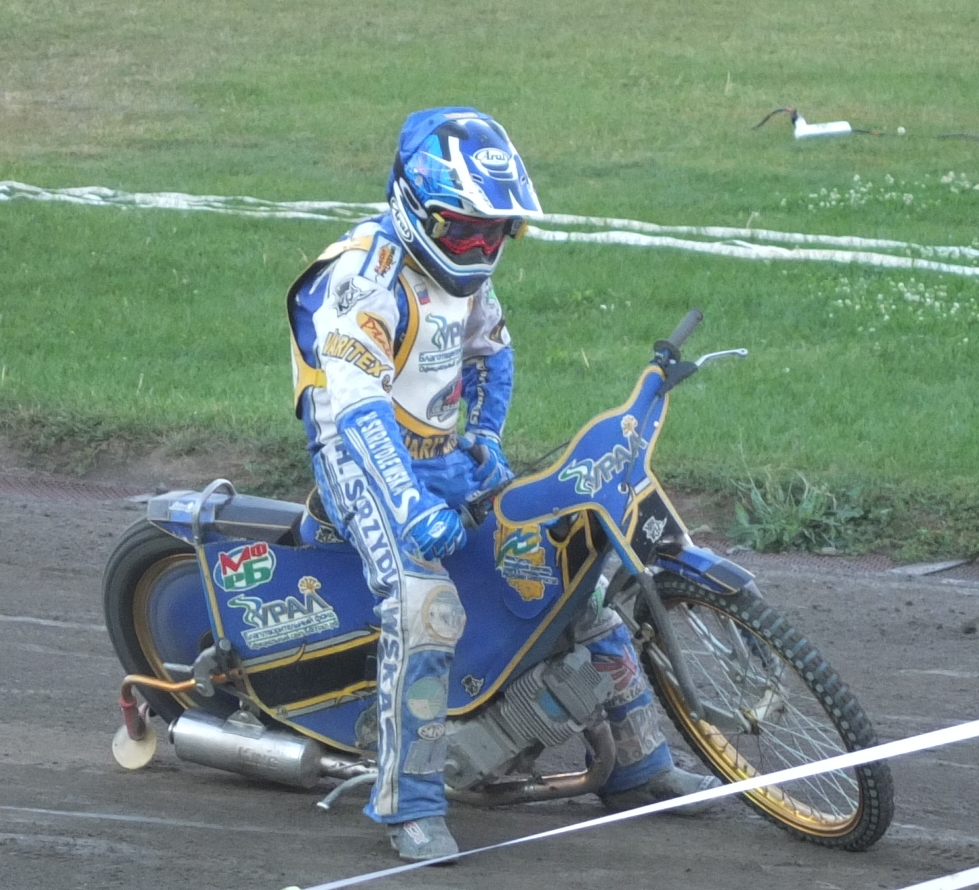
- Born: 10 January 1981 (age 45); Salavat, Soviet Union
- Nationality: Russian

Career history

Russia
- 1997, 2000, 2006, 2008, 2011–2014: Salavat
- 1999, 2007: Vladivostok
- 1998, 2001–2005, 2015–2021: Oktyabrsky
- 2009: Balakovo
- 2010: Togliatti

Poland
- 2006: Daugavpils
- 2007: Krosno
- 2008: Rawicz
- 2009: Miskolc
- 2010: Kraków

Team honours
- 2004: European Pairs Championship silver

Simon Vladimirovich Vlasov (born 10 January 1981) is a former Russian international motorcycle speedway rider.

== Career ==
Vlasov represented the Russia national speedway team at the 2003 Speedway World Cup, where the team reached the race-off event.

Vlasov won the silver medal with Renat Gafurov and Siergiej Filiushin at the 2004 European Pairs Speedway Championship in Debrecen, Hungary.

The following year, Vlasov competed for Russia in the 2005 Speedway World Cup, where the team reached Event 1 before being eliminated.

Vlasov competed in the Team Speedway Polish Championship from 2006 to 2010.
