= Denis Saifutdinov =

Russian motorcycle speedway rider (born 1981)

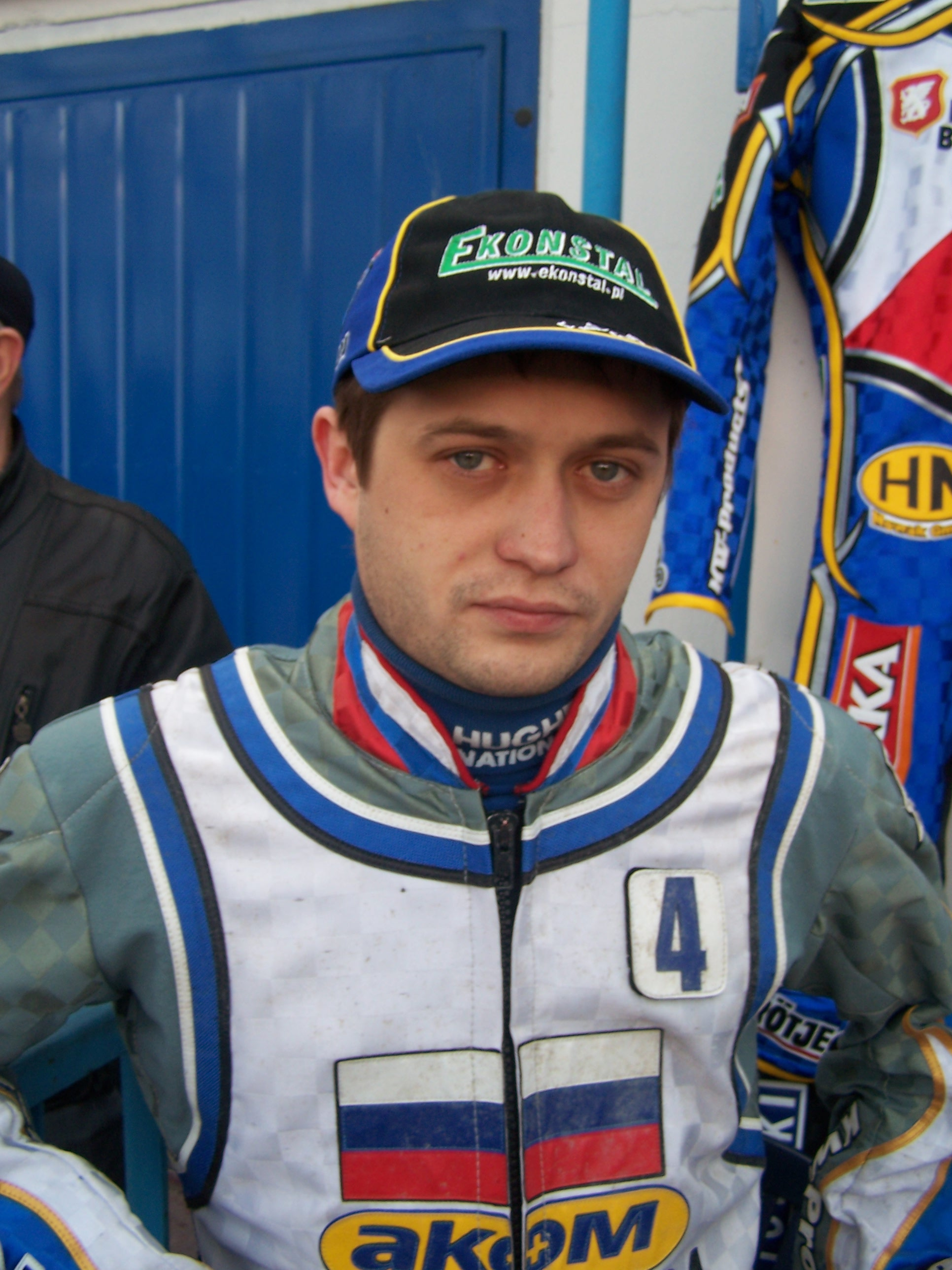
- Born: 2 June 1981 (age 45)
- Nationality: Russian

Career history

Russia
- 1996–1997, 2004, 2006, 2011–2012: Salavat
- 1998–2003: Oktyabrsky
- 2007–2008: Togliatti
- 2009–2010: Balakovo

Poland
- 2005–2006: Daugavpils
- 2008–2009: Łódź

Denis Damirovich Saifutdinov (Russian: Денис Дамирович Сайфутдинов; born 2 June 1981) is a Russian motorcycle speedway rider who rode in the 2002 Speedway World Cup for the Russia national speedway team.

== Career ==
Saifutdinov was born into a Tatar family. His parents are Damir and Tamara; his brother, Emil Saifutdinov (born 1989) is also a speedway rider.

Saifutdinov was 15th in the 2002 Individual Speedway Junior World Championship and scored two points. Also in 2002, he represented the Russian team during the World Cup, finishing third in the event 3 qualifier.

Saifutdinov spent four seasons racing in the Team Speedway Polish Championship from 2005 to 2009.

== See also ==
- Russia national speedway team
