= Eduard Shaihullin =

Russian speedway rider (1974–2020)

- Born: 20 October 1974; Soviet Union
- Died: 6 June 2020 (aged 45)
- Nationality: Russian

Career history

Russia
- 1991–2005: Oktyabrsky
- 2006–2007: Vladivostok
- 2008: Salavat

Poland
- 2001–2002: Lublin

Individual honours
- 1998, 2000: Russian championship bronze

Team honours
- 2000: European Club Champions' Cup runner-up

Eduard Musfirovich Shaihullin (20 October 1974 – 6 June 2020) was a Russian motorcycle speedway rider who was a member of Russia national speedway team at 2001 and 2002 Speedway World Cup.

== Career ==
Shaihullin spent two years racing in the Team Speedway Polish Championship from 2001 to 2002.

Shaihullin won the bronze medal at the Russian national championship in 1998 and 2000.

Shaihullin represented Russia at two Speedway World Cups in 2001, when they reached the race-off and the following year in 2002, when they were eliminated in event 3.

After his riding career, Shaihullin worked for the Oktyabrsky club and became the club's president, a role he served until the end of 2013. He died on 6 June 2020, aged 45.

== Honours ==
=== World Championships ===
- Team World Championship (Speedway World Team Cup and Speedway World Cup)
  - 2001 – (Poland) – 8th place (3 pts in Race-off)
  - 2002 – (England) – 9th place (1 pt in Event 3)

=== European Championships ===
- European Club Champions' Cup
  - 2000 – (Poland) Piła – Runner-up (2 pts)
