= 2004 European Speedway Club Champions' Cup =

European motorcycle speedway event

European Speedway Club Champions' Cup
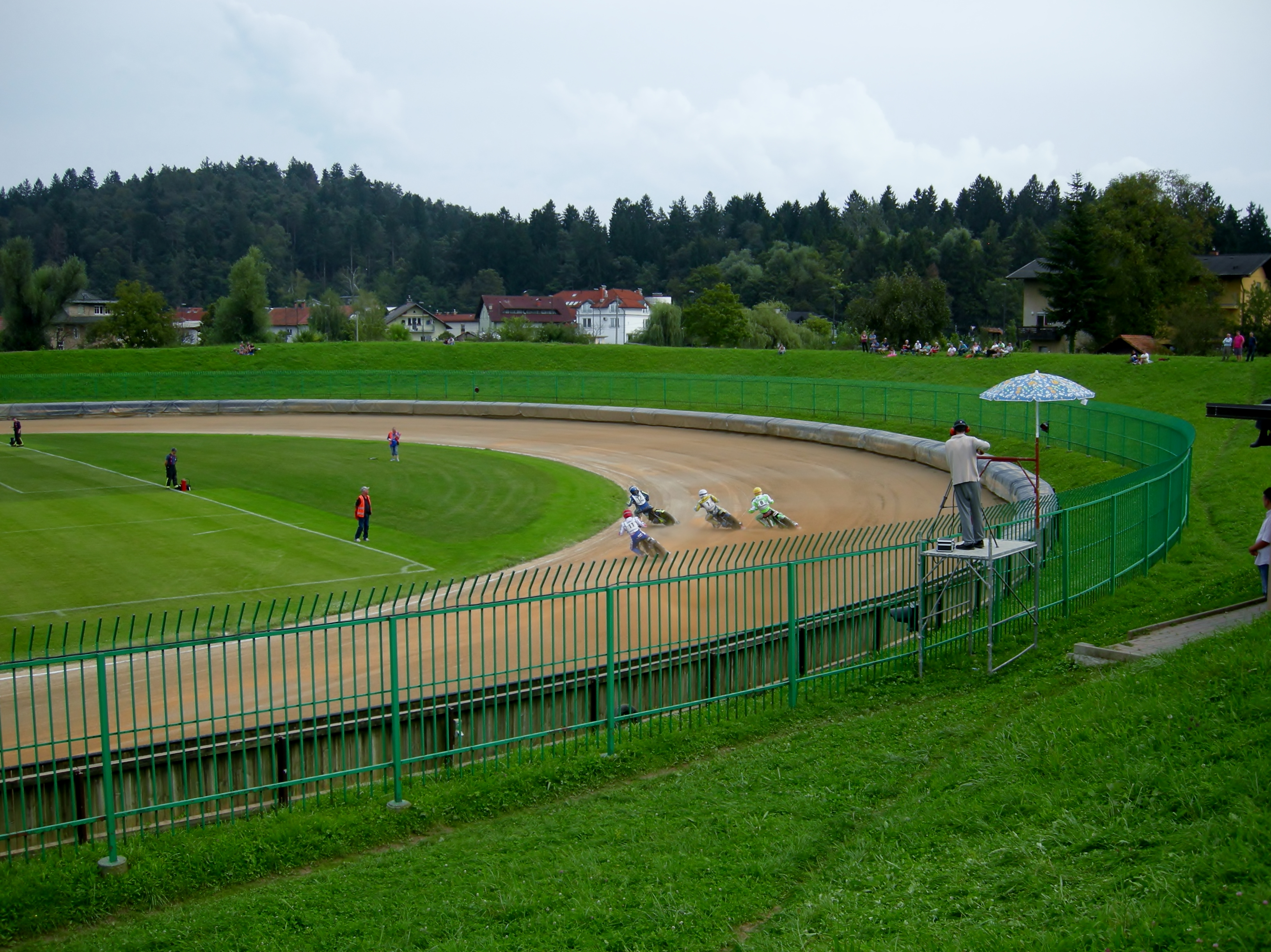
- Ilirija Sports Park in Ljubljana hosted the final.
- Start date: 22 August
- End date: 19 September

The 2004 European Speedway Club Champions' Cup was the seventh motorcycle speedway championship for clubs competing in Europe. It was organised by the European Motorcycle Union (UEM). The competition was primarily for Eastern European teams and only featured Polish teams from three of the 'Big four' leagues, with the British, Swedish and Danish leagues choosing not to compete.

Włókniarz Częstochowa won the championship.

== Qualifying ==
- 22 August 2004
- (Latvia) Latvijas Spidveja Centrs, Daugavpils
- Referee:

Placing	Helmet	Team	Points

1	(Poland) Włókniarz Częstochowa	49

Qualify to Final		Draw Color: yellow	
No	Rider Name	Pts.	Heats
13	Grzegorz Walasek	13	(3,3,1,3,3)
14	Rafał Osumek	11	(E,2,3,3,3)
15	Michał Szczepaniak	11	(1,2,3,3,2)
16	Sebastian Ułamek	14	(3,3,2,3,3)
20	Mateusz Szczepaniak	-	

2	(Latvia) Lokomotiv Daugavpils	39

		Draw Color: white	
No	Rider Name	Pts.	Heats
9	Andrejs Koroļevs	10	(3,2,2,1,2)
10	Leonid Paura	3	(1,-,-,2,-)
11	Kasts Poudzuks	10	(2,3,1,2,2)
12	Nikolaj Kokin	8	(2,2,2,-,2)
19	Adam Skórnicki	8	(1,2,2,3)

3	(Germany) MC Güstrow	27

		Draw Color: blue	
No	Rider Name	Pts.	Heats
5	Christian Hefenbrock	12	(3,3,3,2,1)
6	Danny Knakowski	2	(1,0,1,X,-)
7	Aleksander Lieschke	5	(2,1,-,1,1)
8	Roberto Diener	7	(2,1,3,1,X)
18	Michael Moller	1	(T,1)

4	(Ukraine) SK Trofimov Rivne	5

		Draw Color: red	
No	Rider Name	Pts.	Heats
1	Aleksandr Borodaj	0	(0,E,0,0,0)
2	Oleg Nemchuk	0	(E,0,0,-,F)
3	Wladimir Kolodij	1	(F,0,1,0,0)
4	Alexander Ivanov	1	(-,1,0,E,-)
17	Wladimir Trofimov	3	(1,1,1)

== Final ==
- 19 September 2003
- (Slovenia) Ilirija Sports Park, Ljubljana
- Referee:

Placing	Helmet	Team	Points

1	(Poland) Włókniarz Częstochowa	73

Winner - Gold medal		Draw Color: yellow	
No	Rider Name	Pts.	Heats
1	Grzegorz Walasek	12	(1,2,4,3,2)
2	Sebastian Ułamek	17	(4,4,3,2,4)
3	Ryan Sullivan	15	(2,4,4,1,4)
4	Rune Holta	18	(4,4,2,4,4)
5	Michał Szczepaniak	11	(4,3,0,1,3)

2	(Russia) Mega-Lada Togliatti	63

Silver medal		Draw Color: red	
No	Rider Name	Pts.	Heats
1	Leigh Adams	21	(E,2,3,4,8J,4)
2	Roman Povazhny	16	(3,2,2,2,4,3)
3	Ilya Bondarenko	10	(1,4,1,2,2)
4	Sergey Darkin	11	(1,4,2,4,F)
5	Oleg Kurguskin	5	(2,1,2,-,-)

3	(Slovenia) AMTK Ljubljana	60

Bronze medal		Draw Color: white	
No	Rider Name	Pts.	Heats
1	Izak Šantej	13	(4,2,4,3,E)
2	David Howe	2	(0,1,E,F,1)
3	Matej Žagar	20	(4,3,4,6J,3)
4	Niels Kristian Iversen	10	(0,1,4,2,3)
5	Bjarne Pedersen	15	(3,3,3,3,3)

4	(Czech Republic) Olymp Prague	42

		Draw Color: green	
No	Rider Name	Pts.	Heats
1	Richard Wolff	12	(3,2,1,3,1,2)
2	Josef Franc	10	(1,3,2,2,E,2)
3	Pavel Ondrašík	0	(0,0,0,-,-)
4	Luboš Tomíček, Jr.	8	(2,1,3,1,1)
5	Bohumil Brhel	12	(E,3,0,8J,1)

5	(Hungary) Debrecen Speedway	22

		Draw Color: blue	
No	Rider Name	Pts.	Heats
1	Sandor Tihanyi	4	(2,1,1,0,T)
2	Matej Ferjan	4	(2,E,1,1,-,-)
3	Norbert Magosi	7	(3,0,3,0,0,1)
4	Attila Stefani	6	(3,0,0,E,2,1)
5	Manuel Hauzinger	1	(E,F,1,-,E)
