= 2006 European Speedway Club Champions' Cup =

European motorcycle speedway event

European Speedway Club Champions' Cup
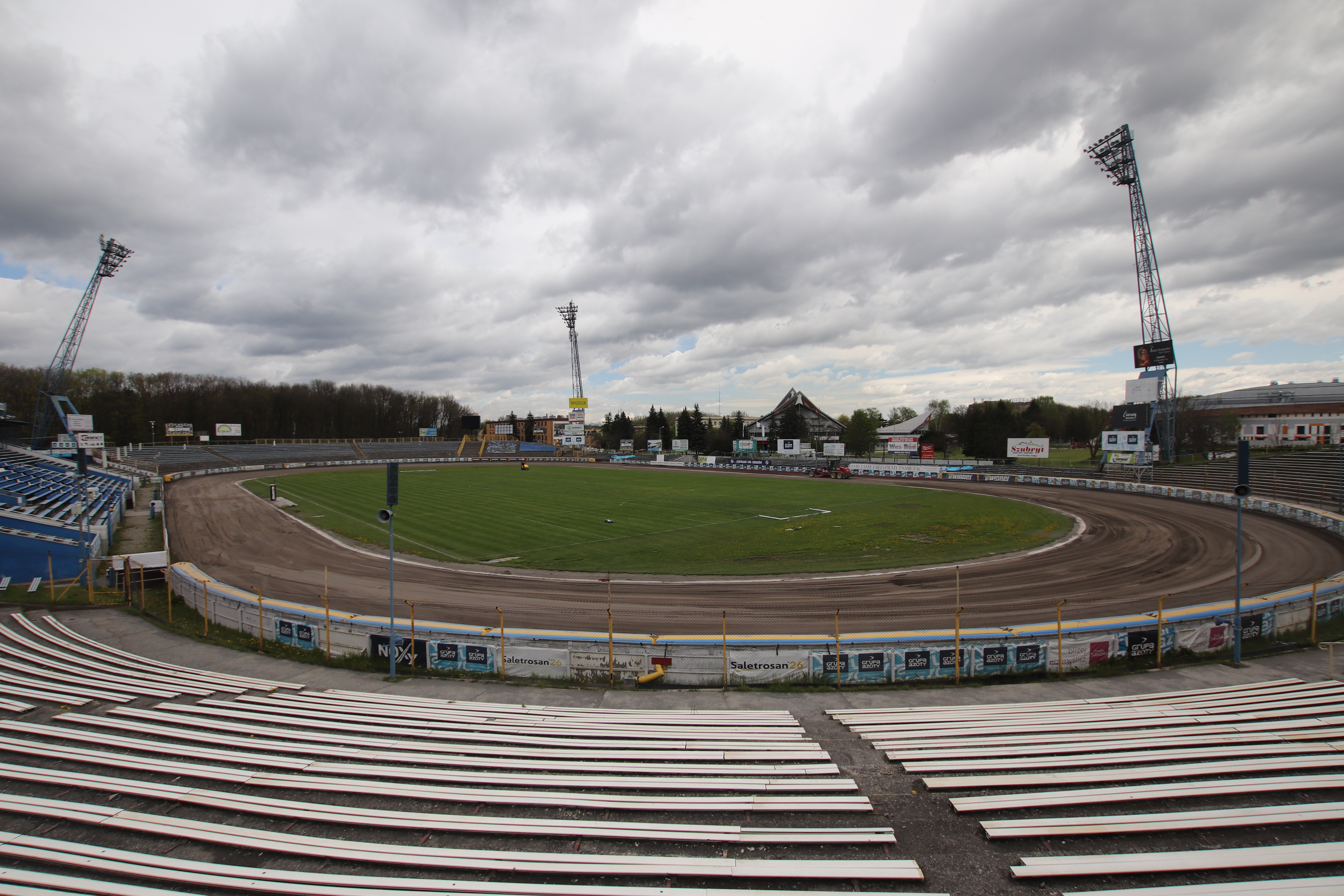
- The Swallow's Nest in Tarnów hosted the final.
- Start date: 22 July
- End date: 3 September

The 2006 European Speedway Club Champions' Cup was the ninth motorcycle speedway championship for clubs competing in Europe. It was organised by the European Motorcycle Union (UEM). The competition was primarily for Eastern European teams and only featured Polish teams from three of the 'Big four' leagues, with the British, Swedish and Danish leagues choosing not to compete.

Unia Tarnów won the championship.

== Calendar ==
Day	Venue	Winner	
Semi-finals
22 July	(Hungary) Debrecen	(Hungary) Simon&Wolf Debrecen	result
13 August	(Latvia) Daugavpils	(Latvia) Lokomotiv Daugavpils	result
Final
3 September	(Poland) Tarnów	(Poland) Unia Tarnów	result

== Semi-finals ==
=== Semi-Final 1 ===
- 22 July 2006
- (Hungary) Hajdú Volán Stadion, Debrecen
- Referee: ?

Placing	Helmet	Team	Points

1	(Hungary) Simon&Wolf Debrecen	45

Qualify to Final		Draw Color: red	
No	Rider Name	Pts.	Heats
1	(Poland) Tomasz Chrzanowski	8	(2,3,-,-,3)
2	(Poland) Maciej Kuciapa	9	(1,3,2,2,1)
3	(Hungary) Sandor Tihanyi	12	(3,2,3,3,1)
4	(Poland) Tomasz Rempała	6	(2,-,-,2,2)
17	(Slovenia) Matej Ferjan	10	(2,3,2,3)

2	(Russia) Mega-Lada Togliatti	38

Qualify to Final		Draw Color: blue	
No	Rider Name	Pts.	Heats
5	(Norway) Rune Holta	13	(2,3,3,3,2)
6	(Russia) Ilya Bondarenko	8	(3,1,2,1,1)
7	(Russia) Evgeny Gomozov	7	(1,2,1,2,1)
8	(Russia) Roman Ivanov	10	(2,2,1,3,2)
18	(Czech Republic) Bohumil Brhel	-	

3	(Slovenia) AMTK Ljubljana	34

		Draw Color: white	
No	Rider Name	Pts.	Heats
9	(Slovenia) Matej Žagar	12	(3,3,3,e,3)
10	(Slovenia) Jernej Kolenko	12	(3,1,2,3,3)
11	(Slovenia) Maks Gregorič	5	(1,e,1,1,2)
12	(Slovenia) Izak Šantej	5	(e,1,1,1,2)
19	(Slovenia) Matic Voldrih	-	

4	(Croatia) SC Unia Goričan	3

		Draw Color: yellow	
No	Rider Name	Pts.	Heats
13	(Croatia) Ivan Vargek	1	(0,0,1,f,0)
14	(Croatia) Renato Cvetko	2	(1,1,0,0,0)
15	(Croatia) Marko Vlah	0	(0,0,0,0,0)
16	(Croatia) Marko Oto	0	(0,n,n,n,n)
20	None		

=== Semi-Final 2 ===
- 13 August 2006
- (Latvia) Latvijas Spidveja Centrs, Daugavpils
- Referee: ?

Placing	Helmet	Team	Points

1	(Latvia) Lokomotiv Daugavpils	46

Qualify to Final		Draw Color: blue	
No	Rider Name	Pts.	Heats
5	(Latvia) Kasts Poudzuks	8	(x,2,3,3)
6	(Russia) Grigory Laguta	10	(2,3,2,-,3)
7	(Latvia) Maksims Bogdanovs	8	(3,-,3,2,f,)
8	(Latvia) Andrejs Koroļevs	11	(3,3,-,2,3)
18	(Russia) Sergey Darkin	9	(3,2,2,2)

2	(Germany) MSC Diedenbergen	36

		Draw Color: yellow	
No	Rider Name	Pts.	Heats
13	(Poland) Adam Skórnicki	14	(3,2,1,3,2,3)
14	(Germany) Thomas Stange	-	(-,-,-,-)
15	(Poland) Norbert Magosi	15	(2,3,3,3,2,2)
16	(Poland) Robert Mikołajczak	3	(1,1,1,-,e)
20	(Germany) Ronny Weis	4	(2,1,1,0)

3	(Ukraine) Ukraina Rivne	22

		Draw Color: white	
No	Rider Name	Pts.	Heats
9	(Poland) Piotr Dym	6	(1,2,2,e,1)
10	(Poland) Grzegorz Knapp	11	(2,1,-,3,2,3)
11	(Ukraine) Andrey Karpov	1	(1,e,0,x,t,x)
12	(Ukraine) Viktor Haydym	4	(3,1,0,-)
19	(Ukraine) Oleksandr Boroday	0	(0)

4	(Czech Republic) PSK Olymp Praha	16

		Draw Color: red	
No	Rider Name	Pts.	Heats
1	(Czech Republic) Matěj Kůs	5	(e,2,1,1,1)
2	(Czech Republic) Antonín Galliani	3	(0,-,2,1,0)
3	(Czech Republic) Richard Wolff	2	(0,0,e,1,1)
4	(Czech Republic) Pavel Ondrašík	1	(1,0,-,-)
17	(Czech Republic) Věroslav Kollert	5	(0,3,1,1)

== Final ==
- 3 September 2006 (7pm, local time)
- (Poland) The Swallow's Nest, Tarnów
- Referee: Krister Gardell
- Attendance: 5,000

Placing	Helmet	Team	Points

1	(Poland) Unia Tarnów	51

Winner - Gold medal		Draw Color: blue	
No	Rider Name	Pts.	Heats
5	(Poland) Tomasz Gollob	15	(3,3,3,3,3)
6	(Poland) Janusz Kołodziej	14	(2,3,3,3,3)
7	(Poland) Marcin Rempała	8	(0,1,2,2,3)
8	(Poland) Kamil Zieliński	-	(-,-,-,-,-)
18	(Denmark) Hans Andersen	14	(3,2,3,3,3)

2	(Russia) Mega-Lada Togliatti	36

Silver medal		Draw Color: yellow	
No	Rider Name	Pts.	Heats
13	(Australia) Leigh Adams	12	(3,3,2,2,2)
14	(Denmark) Nicki Pedersen	12	(2,3,3,2,2)
15	(Russia) Ilya Bondarenko	0	(-,-,-,-,0)
16	(Russia) Roman Ivanov	8	(3,2,0,2,1)
20	(England) Gary Havelock	4	(2,e,2,0)

3	(Hungary) Simon&Wolf Debrecen	17

Bronze medal		Draw Color: white	
No	Rider Name	Pts.	Heats
9	(Hungary) Sandor Tihanyi	1	(0,-,-,-,1)
10	(Poland) Tomasz Rempała	4	(1,2,1,0,0)
11	(Poland) Maciej Kuciapa	5	(0,1,1,3,0)
12	(Poland) Karol Baran	3	(1,2,x,t,-)
19	(Slovenia) Matej Ferjan	4	(0,1,1,2)

4	(Latvia) Lokomotiv Daugavpils	16

		Draw Color: red	
No	Rider Name	Pts.	Heats
1	(Latvia) Kasts Poudzuks	4	(2,0,1,0,1)
2	(Russia) Grigory Laguta	5	(1,0,2,1,1)
3	(Latvia) Andrejs Koroļevs	3	(1,1,0,1,0)
4	(Latvia) Maksims Bogdanovs	4	(0,1,0,1,2)
17	None		
