= 2002 Speedway World Cup Event 3 =

Information
- Date: 6 August 2002
- City: Eastbourne
- Event: 3 of 5 (8)

Stadium details
- Stadium: Arlington Stadium

SWC Results
| Winner | | Poland - 57 pts |
| Runner-up | | United States - 49 pts |
| 3rd place | | Russia - 24 pts |
| 4th place | | Slovenia - 19 pts |

The 2002 Speedway World Cup Event 3 was the third race of the 2002 Speedway World Cup season. It took place on August 6, 2002 in the Arlington Stadium in Eastbourne, Great Britain.

== Results ==
| Pos. | National team | Pts. |
|---|---|---|
| 1 | Poland | 57 |
| 2 | United States | 49 |
| 3 | Russia | 24 |
| 4 | Slovenia | 19 |

== Heat details ==
| Placing | Team / Rider Name | Total | 1 | 2 | 3 | 4 | 5 | 6 | 7 | 8 | 9 | 10 | 11 | 12 | 13 | 14 | 15 | 16 | 17 | 18 | 19 | 20 | Pts | 21 | 22 | 23 | 24 |
| 1 | Poland | 66 | 2 | 5 | 8 | 10 | 13 | 16 | 19 | 22 | 25 | 28 | 31 | 33 | 34 | 36 | 38 | 41 | 41 | 44 | 44 | 45 | | 48 | 51 | 54 | 66 |
| 1 | (1) Tomasz Gollob | 7 | | | | 2 | | | | | 3 | | | | | 2 | | | | | X | | 7 |
| 1 | (2) Piotr Protasiewicz | 13 | | | 3 | | | | | 3 | | | | | 1 | | | | | 3 | | | 10 | | | 3 |
| 1 | (3) Jarosław Hampel | 14 | | 3 | | | | | 3 | | | | | 2 | | | | 3 | | | | | 11 | | | | 3 |
| 1 | (4) Krzysztof Cegielski | 11 | 2 | | | | | 3 | | | | | 3 | | | | | | T | | | | 8 | 3 |
| 1 | (5) Grzegorz Walasek | 12 | | | | | 3 | | | | | 3 | | | | | 2 | | | | | 1 | 9 | | 3 |
| 2 | United States | 49 | 3 | 4 | 6 | 9 | 11 | 11 | 13 | 15 | 16 | 17 | 21 | 24 | 27 | 30 | 33 | 33 | 36 | 37 | 40 | 43 | | 45 | 47 | 47 | 49 |
| 2 | (1) Greg Hancock | 17 | 3 | | | | | | 2 | | | | 4J | | 3 | | | | | | 3 | | 15 | | | | 2 |
| 2 | (2) Brent Werner | 7 | | 1 | | | | 0 | | | | | | | | 3 | | | | 1 | | | 5 | 2 |
| 2 | (3) Billy Hamill | 11 | | | | 3 | | | | 2 | | | | 3 | | | | | 3 | | | | 11 | | | X |
| 2 | (4) Ryan Fisher | 3 | | | 2 | | | | | | 1 | | - | | | | | X | | | | | 3 |
| 2 | (5) Billy Janniro | 11 | | | | | 2 | | | | | 1 | | | | | 3 | | | | | 3 | 9 | | 2 |
| 3 | Russia | 24 | 1 | 3 | 4 | 4 | 5 | 9 | 10 | 10 | 12 | 12 | 12 | 12 | 12 | 13 | 13 | 15 | 17 | 17 | 19 | 19 | | 20 | 21 | 23 | 24 |
| 3 | (1) Roman Povazhny | 8 | | | 1 | | | 4J | | | | | | 0 | | | | | | | 2 | | 7 | | | | 1 |
| 3 | (2) Sergey Kuzin | 2 | | | | 0 | | | 1 | | | | M | | | | | | | 0 | | | 1 | 1 |
| 3 | (3) Sergey Darkin | 8 | | 2 | | | | | | | 2 | | | | 0 | | 0 | | 2 | | | | 6 | | | 2 |
| 3 | (4) Denis Saifutdinov | 5 | 1 | | | | | | | 0 | | | | | | 1 | | 2 | | | | 0 | 4 | | 1 |
| 3 | (5) Eduard Shaihullin | 1 | | | | | 1 | | | | | 0 | | | | | - | | | | | - | 1 |
| 4 | Slovenia | 19 | 0 | 0 | 0 | 1 | 1 | 2 | 2 | 3 | 3 | 5 | 6 | 7 | 9 | 9 | 10 | 11 | 12 | 16 | 17 | 19 | | 19 | 19 | 19 | 19 |
| 4 | (1) Denis Štojs | 1 | | 0 | | | | | | - | | | - | | | | | | | | 1 | | 1 |
| 4 | (2) Matej Žagar | 5 | 0 | | | | | | | | 0 | | | 1 | | | | | | 4J | | | 5 | | F |
| 4 | (3) Ales Dolinar | 1 | | | 0 | | | | X | | | | | | | 0 | | | 1 | | | | 1 | 0 |
| 4 | (4) Izak Šantej | 6 | | | | 1 | | 1 | | | | | 1 | | 2 | | | 1 | | | | | 6 | | | | 0 |
| 4 | (5) Jernej Kolenko | 6 | | | | | 0 | | | 1 | | 2 | | | | | 1 | | | | | 2 | 6 | | | X |
| Placing | Team / Rider Name | Total | 1 | 2 | 3 | 4 | 5 | 6 | 7 | 8 | 9 | 10 | 11 | 12 | 13 | 14 | 15 | 16 | 17 | 18 | 19 | 20 | Pts | 21 | 22 | 23 | 24 |

M - exclusion for exceeding two minute time allowance • T - exclusion for touching the tapes • X - other exclusion • E - retired or mechanical failure • F - fell

Helmet colours was permanent for each teams (Red, Blue, White and Yellow/Black). Colours in diagrams means gate positions:
| gate A – inside | gate B | gate C | gate D – outside |

== See also ==
- 2002 Speedway World Cup
- motorcycle speedway
