= Aleš Dolinar =

Slovenian speedway rider

- Born: June 1, 1979 (age 47)
- Nationality: Slovenia

Career history
- 1998-2003: AMTK Ljubljana
- 2000: OAMTC ZV Wiener Neustadt

Aleš Dolinar (born 1 June 1979) is a Slovenian motorcycle speedway rider who was a member of Slovenia team.

== Career ==
Dolinar represented Slovenia at the 2002 Speedway World Cup, and 2003 Speedway World Cup.

== Honours ==
=== World Championships ===
- Team World Championship (Speedway World Team Cup and Speedway World Cup)
  - 2001 - started in Qualification only
  - 2002 - (England) - 11th place (1 pt in Event 3)
  - 2003 - (Denmark) - 9th place (4 pts in Event 2)
- Individual U-21 World Championship
  - 1998 - (Poland) Piła - 18th place (1 pt)

=== European Championships ===
- Individual U-19 European Championship
  - 1998 - (Slovenia) Krško - 6th place (9 pts)
- European Club Champions' Cup
  - 1998 - 2nd place in Group A
  - 1999 - started in Group B only
  - 2003 - (Hungary) Debrecen - 3rd place

== See also ==
- Slovenia national speedway team
