= Ilya Bondarenko (speedway rider) =

Russian motorcycle speedway rider

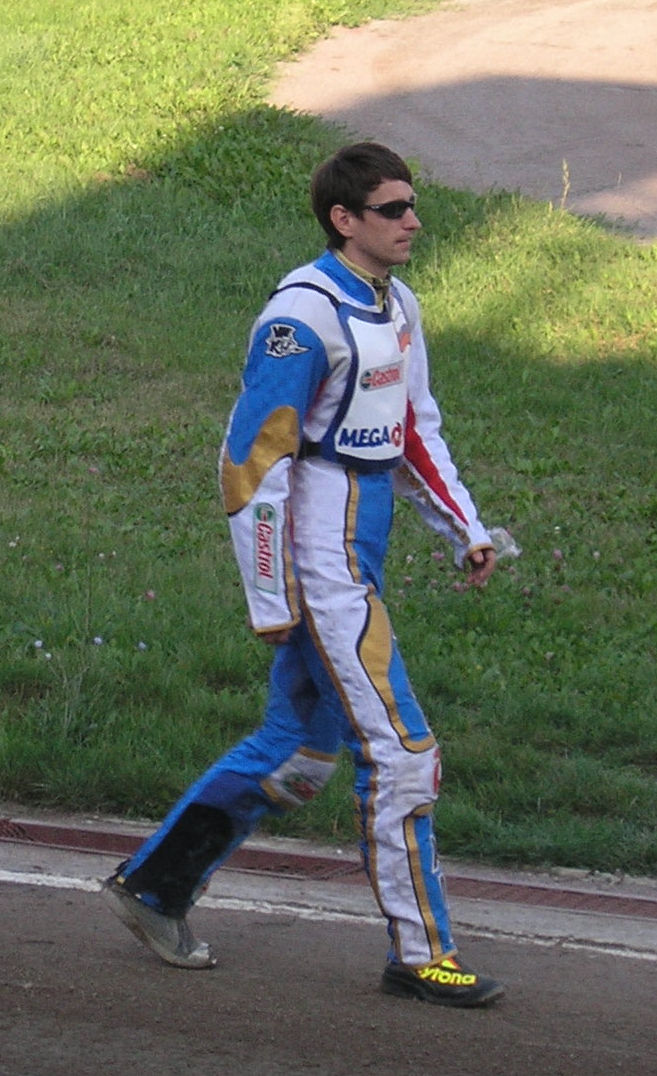
- Born: 16 February 1982 (age 44); Togliatti, Soviet Union
- Nationality: Russian

Career history

Russia
- 1998, 2020: Vladivostok
- 1999–2009, 2014: Togliatti
- 2010: Oktyabrsky

Poland
- 1998: Daugavpils
- 1999–2014: Rivne
- 1999–2014: Opole

Great Britain
- 2011: Leicester Lions

Individual honours
- 2004, 2009: Russian championship bronze

Team honours
- 2001–2008 (x8): Russian Team Speedway Championship

Ilya Nikolaevich Bondarenko (Russian: Иль́я Никола́евич Бондаре́нко) is a former Russian motorcycle speedway rider. He earned three caps for the Russia national speedway team.

== Biography ==
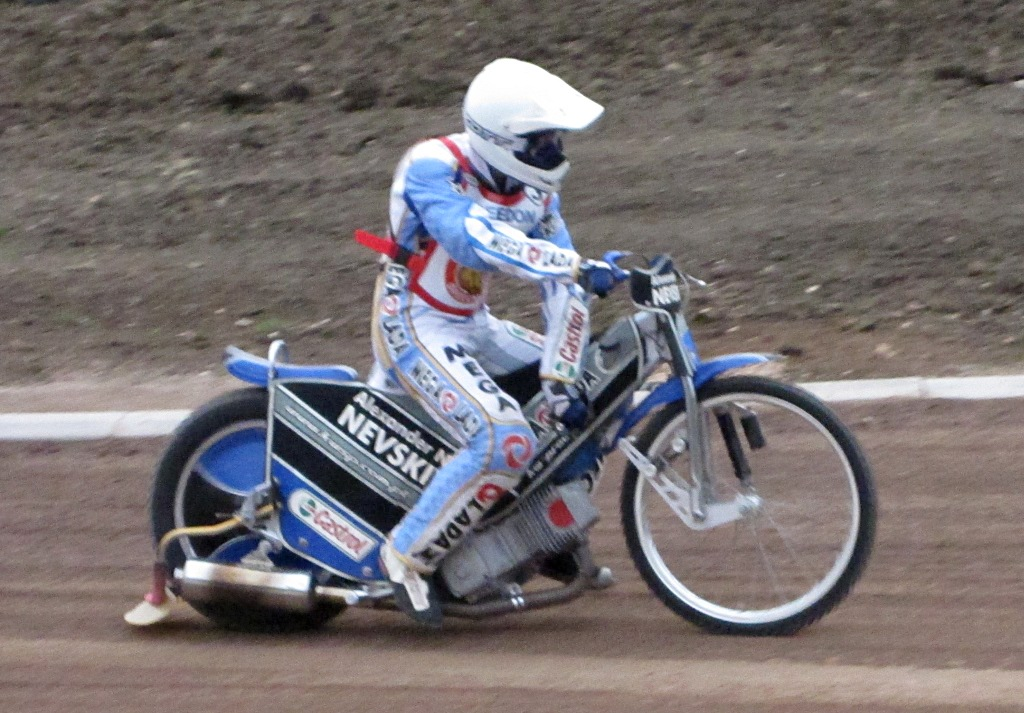
Riding for Leicester Lions, March 2011

Born 16 February 1982 in Togliatti, his brother Pavel is also a former speedway rider, and their uncle Anatoly Bondarenko was twice world ice speedway champion.

Bondarenko was a three-time youth champion of Russia in team and individual competition during 1997, 1998 and 1999 and first represented Russia in 2006.

Bondarenko was part of the Mega-Lada Togliatti team that dominated the Russian Team Speedway Championship from 2001 until 2008, winning eight consecutive league titles with the club. Bondarenko also spent four years racing in the Team Speedway Polish Championship from 2007 to 2010.

Bondarenko was twice the bronze medalist of the Russian Individual Speedway Championship in 2004 and 2009.

In 2011, Bondarenko rode for Leicester Lions in the British Premier League, where he spent the 2011 Premier League speedway season with fellow Russian Sergey Darkin.

== See also ==
- Russia national speedway team
