= Army Sports Club Stadium (Lviv) =

Stadium in Lviv, Ukraine

SKA Stadium
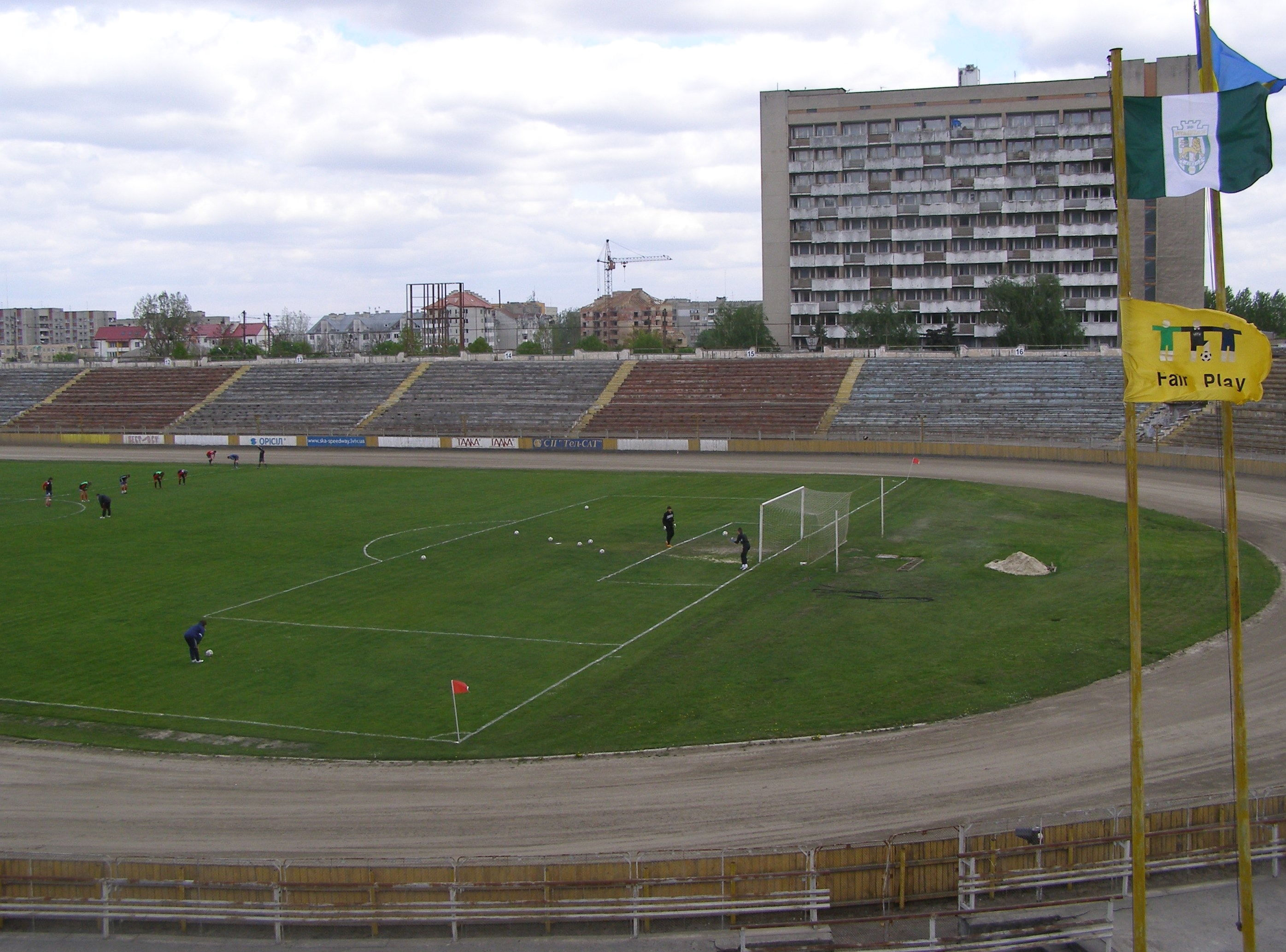
- Interactive map of SKA Stadium
- Location: Lviv, Ukraine
- Coordinates: 49°51′10″N 24°0′49.40″E
- Owner: Ukrainian Ministry of Defense (1991–present); Carpathian Military District (1944–1991); Polish Armed Forces (1920s-1939)
- Capacity: 23,040 (football)
- Surface: Grass

Construction
- Opened: late 19th century

Tenants
- SKA; Karpaty-2; SKA-Orbita

The SKA Stadium or Stadion SKA (Ukrainian: Стадіон «СКА») is a multi-purpose stadium in Lviv, Ukraine. It is located in the Lviv neighborhood Klepariv, which was a suburb that is now part of the city center. The stadium is part of a bigger sports complex for summer sports, which belongs to the Ukrainian Ministry of Defense. The stadium is used often for football matches, and was the home of Karpaty Lviv reserve teams and FC Lviv. The stadium holds 23,040 spectators.

== History ==
The sports complex appeared here sometime in the late 19th century, which belonged to the Austria-Hungary military. Following the World War I, during the interbellum Poland in 1928-1935, the complex was transformed into a sports park of the 26th Infantry Regiment of the Polish Armed Forces. (The 26th Infantry Regiment was part of the 5th Infantry Division).

After World War II, the stadium was used by the local Soviet military football team since 1949. In 1955-1967, the stadium was rebuilt and expanded. Another reconstruction took place in the late 1970s and early 1980s.

== Speedway ==
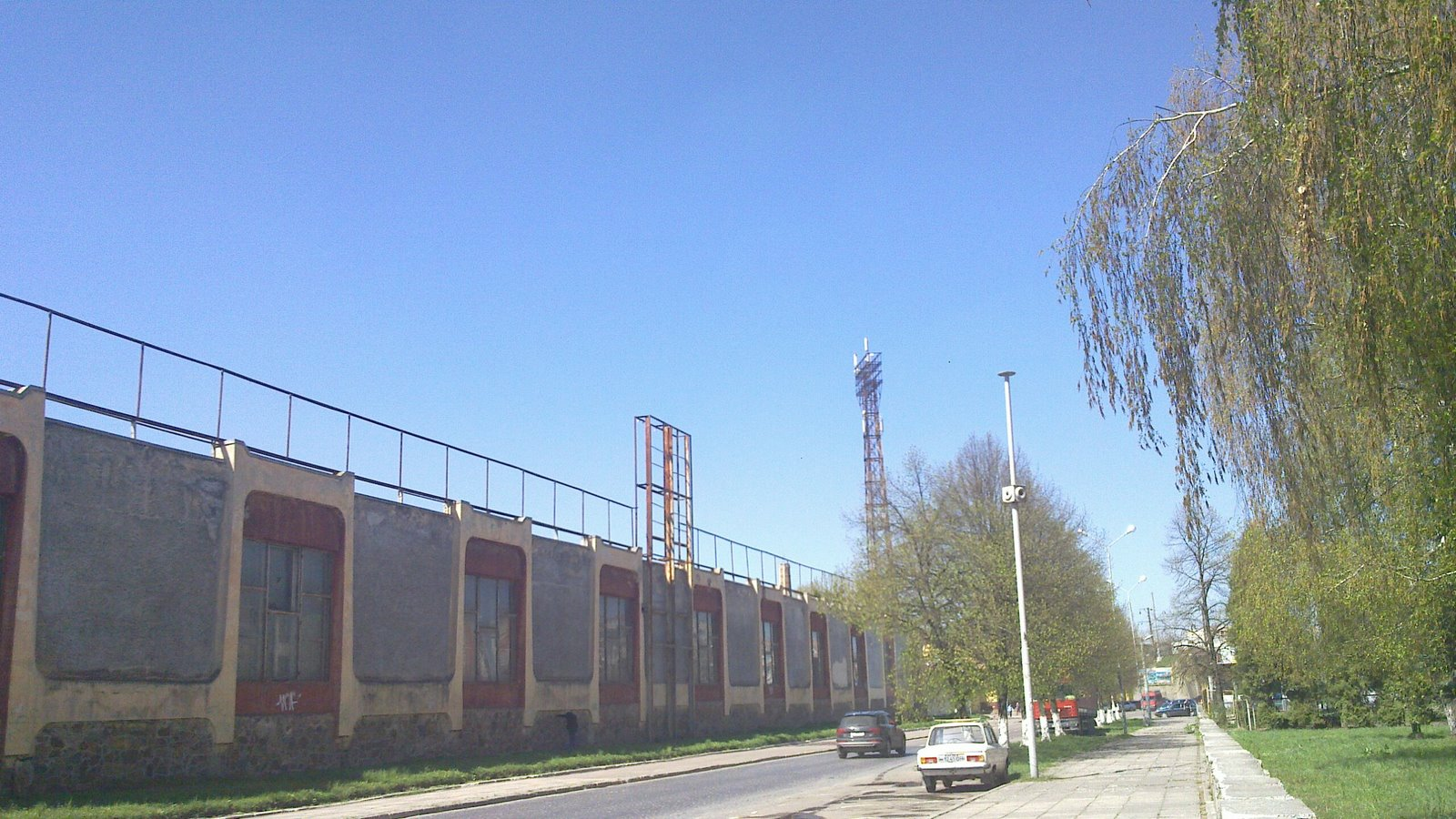
Exterior of the stadium

The venue has hosted motorcycle speedway and the speedway team known as SKA-Speedway Lviv from 1961 to 1966 and again from 1988 to 2010. It also hosted rounds of the 1964 Speedway World Team Cup and the 1966 Speedway World Team Cup.

The speedway team SKA Speedway Lviv competed in the European Speedway Club Champions' Cup in 2003 and 2009. They also competed in the Team Speedway Polish Championship in 2004.
