= 1999 European Speedway Club Champions' Cup =

European motorcycle speedway event

European Speedway Club Champions' Cup
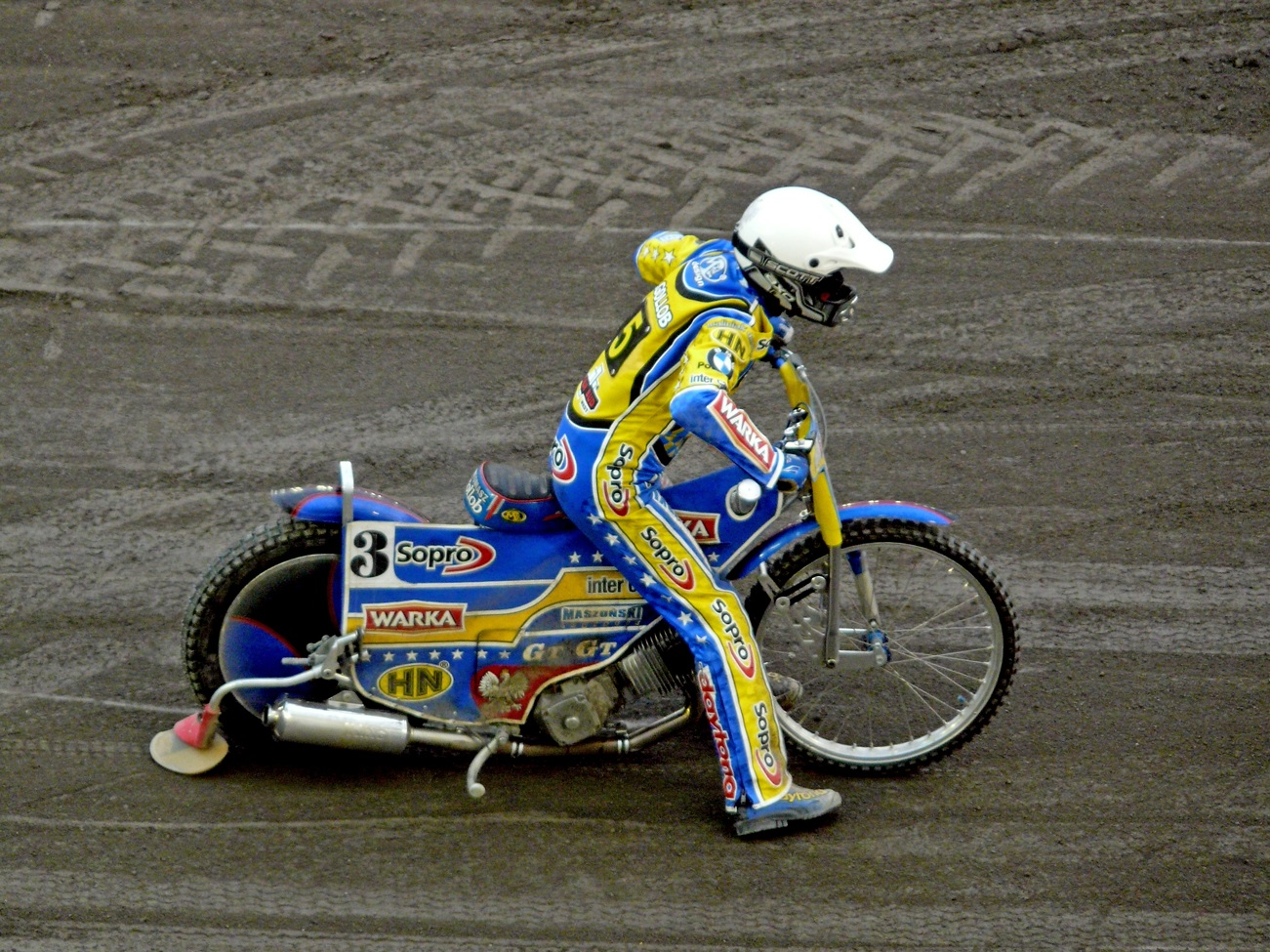
- Tomasz Gollob helped Polonia Bydgoszcz successfully defend their title, scoring a maximum in the final.
- Start date: 27 June
- End date: 11 September

The 1999 European Speedway Club Champions' Cup was the second motorcycle speedway championship for clubs competing in Europe. It was organised by the European Motorcycle Union (UEM). The competition was primarily for Eastern European teams and only featured Polish teams from three of the 'Big four' leagues, with the British, Swedish and Danish leagues choosing not to compete.

Polonia Bydgoszcz from Poland successfully defended their title.

== Qualifying ==
Moto Club Lonigo qualified for stage 2 but were replaced by AMTK Ljubljana

=== Stage 1 ===
- 27 June 1999
- (Portugal) Santarém Speedway, Santarém

Placing	Team / Rider name	Total	1	2	3	4	5	6	7	8	9	10	11	12	13	14	15	16	Pts	17	18	19	20
1	(Italy) Moto Club Lonigo	47	3	6	7	10	12	15	18	20	23	23	25	27	30	32	35	38		40	42	45	47
1	(13) (Italy) Armando Castagna	14		3					3		3							3	12				2
1	(14) (Italy) Andrea Maida	10	3							2		F					3		8	2
1	(15) (Italy) Stefano Alfonso	11			1			3						2		2			8			3
1	(16) (Italy) Alessandro Milanese	12				3	2						2		3				10		2
1	(20) -	0																	0
2	(Slovenia) AMTK Ljubljana	45	2	4	7	7	10	10	11	14	16	19	22	25	27	30	32	34		37	40	42	45
2	(9) (Slovenia) Ales Dolinar	13			3		3					3						2	11			2
2	(10) (Slovenia) Martin Peterca	7				0		-			2						2		4	3
2	(11) (Slovenia) Matej Ferjan	14		2						3			3			3			11				3
2	(12) (Slovenia) Tomas Sustersic	11	2						1					3	2				8		3
2	(19) (Slovenia) Jernej Kolenko	0						E											0
3	(France) SC Marmande	15	1	2	4	5	5	7	9	9	9	10	11	12	12	12	13	13		14	14	14	15
3	(5) (France) Christophe Dubernard	3	1					2					-					0	3			0
3	(6) (France) Stéphane Trésarrieu	3		1			0							1			1		3		0
3	(7) (France) Jeremy Barraud	3				1			-			1				0			2	1
3	(8) (France) Jerome Georges	2			2					0	0				0				2				-
3	(18) (France) Sebastien Trésarrieu	4							2				1						3				1
4	(Netherlands) Wing's 99	13	0	0	0	2	3	4	4	5	6	8	8	8	9	10	10	11		11	12	13	13
4	(1) (Netherlands) Maik Groen	5				2				1				0				1	4			1
4	(2) (Netherlands) Henk Bos	0			0				0				0				0		0	0
4	(3) (Netherlands) Emiel Groen	4		0				1				2			1				4				0
4	(4) (Netherlands) Jim Groen	4	0				1				1					1			3		1
4	(17) -	0																	0
Placing	Team / Rider name	Total	1	2	3	4	5	6	7	8	9	10	11	12	13	14	15	16	Pts	17	18	19	20

M - exclusion for exceeding two-minute time allowance • T - exclusion for touching the tapes • X - other exclusion • E - retired or mechanical failure • F - fell

Helmet colours were permanent for each team (Red, Blue, White and Yellow/Black). Colours in diagrams indicate gate positions:
gate A – inside	gate B	gate C	gate D – outside

=== Stage 2 ===
Mega-Lada Togliatti qualified for the final

- 11 July 1999
- (Ukraine) Rivne Speedway Stadium, Rivne

Placing	Team / Rider name	Total	1	2	3	4	5	6	7	8	9	10	11	12	13	14	15	16	Pts	17	18	19	20
1	(Russia) Mega-Lada Togliatti	49	3	3	3	6	9	12	15	17	20	23	26	28	29	32	35	38		41	44	46	49
1	(5) (Russia) Roman Povazhny	15	3					3					3					3	12				3
1	(6) (Russia) Sergey Yeroshin	11		F			3							2			3		8		3
1	(7) (Russia) Sergey Darkin	12				3			3			3				3			12			-
1	(8) (Russia) Sergey Kuzin	9			F					2	3				1				6	3
1	(18) (Russia) Sergey Chekmarev	2																	0			2
2	(Slovenia) AMTK Ljubljana	33	1	2	3	5	7	8	9	10	12	13	15	18	21	23	23	25		27	29	32	33
2	(13) (Slovenia) Matej Ferjan	8		1					1		2							2	6		2
2	(14) (Slovenia) Martin Peterca	5	1							1		1					0		3	2
2	(15) (Slovenia) Izak Šantej	10			1			1						3		2			7			3
2	(16) (Slovenia) Tomas Sustersic	10				2	2						2		3				9				1
2	(20) -	0																	0
3	(Latvia) Lokomotiv Daugavpils	27	2	5	7	8	8	10	12	15	16	16	17	18	20	20	22	23		24	25	25	27
3	(9) (Latvia) Vitaly Biznya	3			2		F					-						-	2	1
3	(10) (Latvia) Aleksandr Biznya	7				1		2			1						2		6		1
3	(11) (Latvia) Vladimir Voronkov	7		3						3			1			-			7			-
3	(12) (Latvia) Nikolay Kokin	9	2						2					1	2				7				2
3	(19) (Latvia) Maksim Andreev	1										F						1	1			F
4	(Ukraine) SC Rivne	9	0	2	5	5	5	5	5	5	5	7	7	7	7	7	8	8		8	8	9	9
4	(1) (Ukraine) Igor Borisenko	0				X				X				X				X	0		F
4	(2) (Ukraine) Igor Marko	4			3				F				0				1		4				F
4	(3) (Ukraine) Vladimir Kolody	5		2				0				2			0				4			1
4	(4) (Ukraine) Anatoly Zhabchik	0	0				-				X					F			0	-
4	(17) -	0																	0
Placing	Team / Rider name	Total	1	2	3	4	5	6	7	8	9	10	11	12	13	14	15	16	Pts	17	18	19	20

M - exclusion for exceeding two-minute time allowance • T - exclusion for touching the tapes • X - other exclusion • E - retired or mechanical failure • F - fell

Helmet colours were permanent for each team (Red, Blue, White and Yellow/Black). Colours in diagrams indicate gate positions:
gate A – inside	gate B	gate C	gate D – outside

== Final ==
- 11 September 1999
- (Germany) Rhein-Main Arena, Diedenbergen

Placing	Team / Rider name	Total	1	2	3	4	5	6	7	8	9	10	11	12	13	14	15	16	Pts	17	18	19	20
1	(Poland) Polonia Bydgoszcz	50	2	5	8	11	13	16	19	22	24	27	30	33	36	38	41	44		44	47	48	50
1	(1) (Poland) Tomasz Gollob	15				3				3				3				3	12		3
1	(2) (Poland) Piotr Protasiewicz	13			3				3				3				3		12			1
1	(3) (Sweden) Henrik Gustafsson	14		3				3				3			3				12				2
1	(4) (Australia) Shane Parker	8	2				2				2					2			8	E
1	(17) -	0																	0
2	(Germany) MSC Diedenbergen	27	1	1	3	5	5	7	9	10	10	12	14	15	15	18	19	20		21	21	24	27
2	(13) (Germany) Gerd Riss	0		0					-		-							-	0	-
2	(14) (Denmark) Brian Karger	8	1							1		2					1		5			3
2	(15) (United Kingdom) Chris Louis	11			2			2						1		3			8				3
2	(16) (Germany) Robbie Kessler	4				2	0						2		0				4		0
2	(20) (Czech Republic) Aleš Dryml Jr.	4							2		T							1	3	1
3	(Russia) Mega-Lada Togliatti	23	0	2	3	3	4	4	4	6	9	9	10	12	13	13	15	15		18	20	22	23
3	(5) (Russia) Roman Povazhny	1	E					F					1					0	1		-
3	(6) (Russia) Sergey Darkin	8		2			1							2			2		7				1
3	(7) (Russia) Sergey Yeroshin	3				E			-			E				-			0	3
3	(8) (Russia) Oleg Kurguskin	9			1					2	3				1				7			2
3	(18) (Russia) Sergey Kuzin	2							0							0			0		2
4	(Czech Republic) Olymp Prague	20	3	4	4	5	8	9	10	10	11	12	12	12	14	15	15	17		19	20	20	20
4	(9) (Czech Republic) Antonín Kasper Jr.	6			0		3					1						2	6			0
4	(10) (Czech Republic) Zdeněk Schneiderwind	3				1		1			1						E		3		-
4	(11) (Czech Republic) Pavel Ondrašík	4		1						0			0			1			2	2
4	(12) (Czech Republic) Antonín Šváb Jr.	6	3						1					0	2				6				0
4	(19) (Czech Republic) Adrian Rymel	1																	0		1
Placing	Team / Rider name	Total	1	2	3	4	5	6	7	8	9	10	11	12	13	14	15	16	Pts	17	18	19	20

M - exclusion for exceeding two-minute time allowance • T - exclusion for touching the tapes • X - other exclusion • E - retired or mechanical failure • F - fell

Helmet colours were permanent for each team (Red, Blue, White and Yellow/Black). Colours in diagrams indicate gate positions:
gate A – inside	gate B	gate C	gate D – outside
