= Lviv Speedway =

Ukrainian motorcycle speedway team

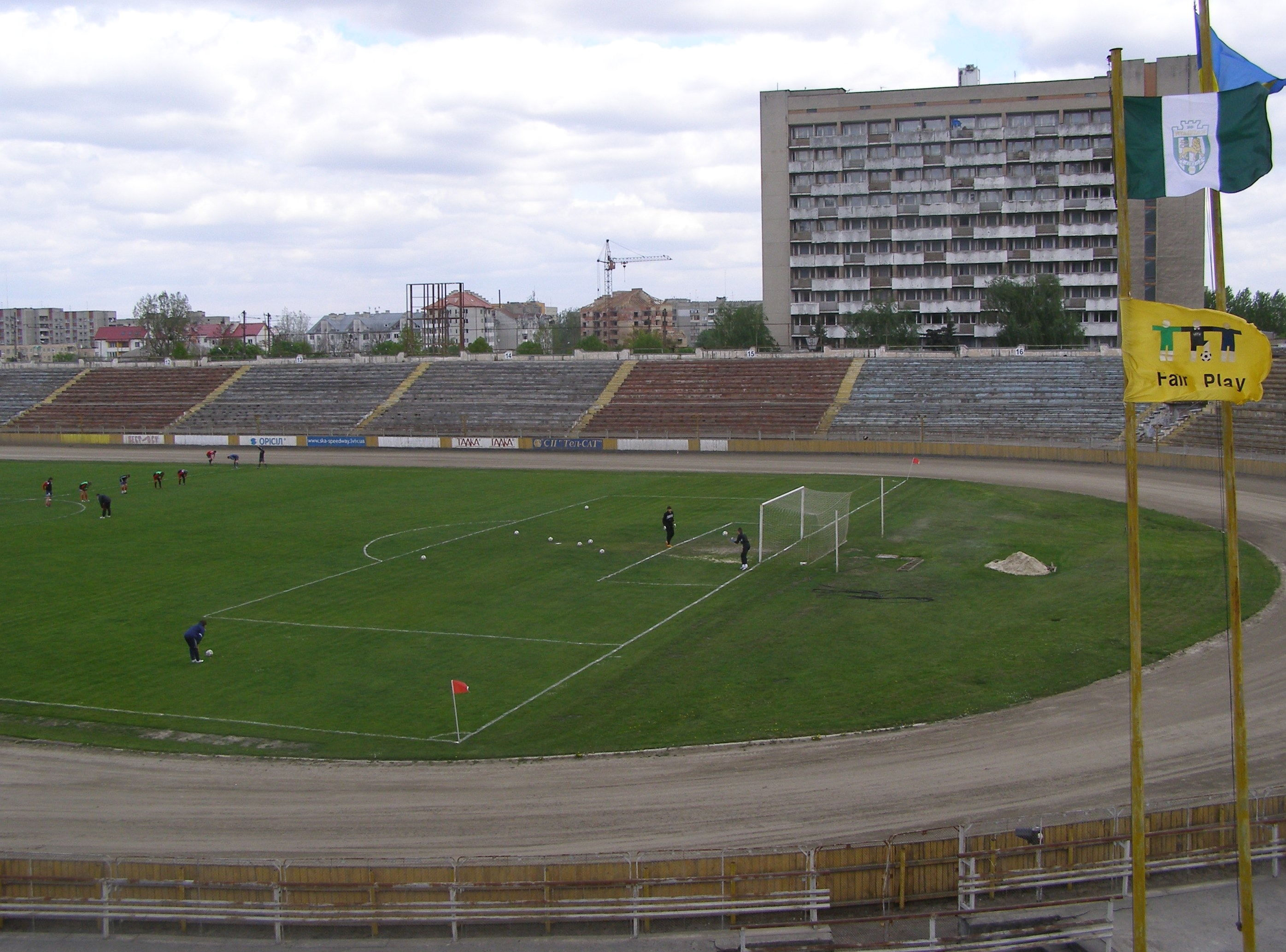
- The SKA Stadium

Club information
- Track address: SKA Stadium; Kleparivska St, 39А, Lviv, Lviv Oblast
- Country: Ukraine
- Founded: 1960

Club facts
- Track record time: 67.07 sec
- Track record date: 9 September 1990
- Track record holder: Dean Standing

Major team honours
Soviet Union champions	1963, 1991
Soviet Union silver medal	1962, 1966, 1990

Lviv Speedway is a Ukrainian motorcycle speedway team based in Lviv.

== Stadium ==
SKA Stadium or Army Sports Club Stadium (Lviv) is located at Kleparivska St, 39А, Lviv, Lviv Oblast, Ukraine, 79000. It has a capacity of 23,040.

== History ==
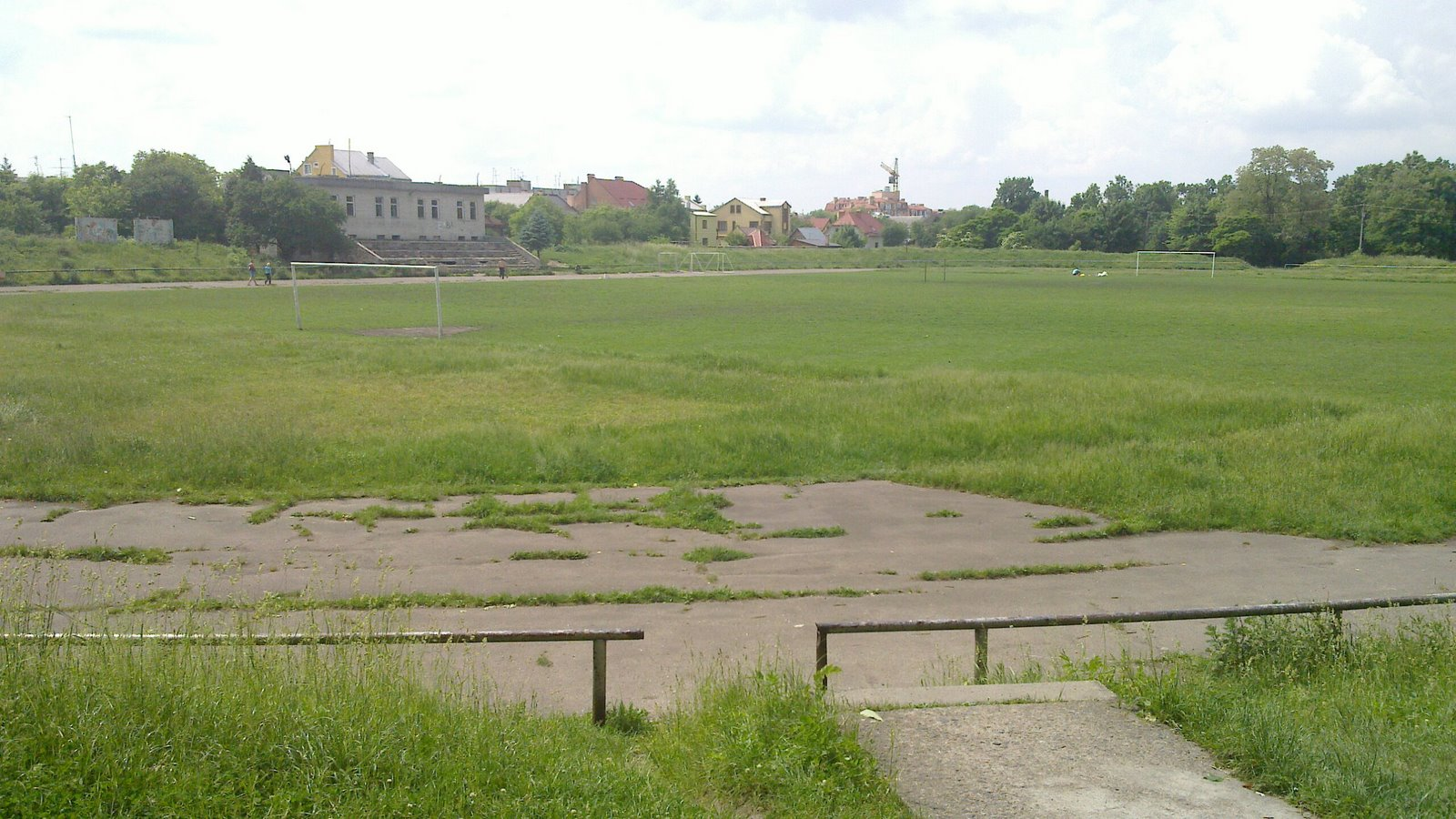
The Silmash Stadium hosted Lviv speedway in 1967 and 1968

The club was founded in 1960 under the leadership of motorcycle sports coach Volodymyr Bondarchuk and they began league speedway in 1962, as part of the inaugural Soviet Union Championship and won the silver medal during the first year of competition. During the first year of league competition, the team used the name Karpaty Lviv, from the regional toponym Karpaty (Carpathian Mountains). However the following season in 1963, the club had four teams, three of them taking on the SKA Lviv name, which was a multi purpose sports club and SKA Lviv I, won the championship of the Soviet Union. The team were prominent again from 1964 to 1966, winning bronze and silver medals respectively.

The team did not compete in the league for several years and were forced to relocate to the Silmash Stadium on Sulymy St, before returning as Karpaty Lviv from 1972 to 1975 and then underwent a longer break from the league.

SKA Lviv were revived in 1988, on the initiative of Serhiy Latosinsky the Ukraine national speedway team coach.

During the fall of Real socialism in the Eastern Bloc countries, Lviv speedway returned to the top, winning the 1991 championship of the Soviet Union. Following the dissolution of the Soviet Union the team were left in limbo due to the lack of a serious team competition in Ukraine, although they did race in the now defunct European Speedway Club Champions' Cup in 2003 and 2009. The SKA-Speedway Lviv team joined the Team Speedway Polish Championship during the 2004 Polish speedway season but only spent the one season in 2.Liga.

A team from Lviv have not raced in recent years and following the Russian invasion of Ukraine in February 2022, the future of the club is unknown.

== Results ==
Champions' Cup competition

- 2003 - 7th place
- 2009 - 6th place

Polish Speedway Championship

- 2004 - 4th in 2.Liga
