= 2003 Speedway World Cup Event 2 =

Information
- Date: 4 August 2003
- City: Outrup
- Event: 2 of 5 (12)

SWC Results
Winner		Australia - 62 pts
Runner-up		Great Britain - 60 pts
3rd place		Slovenia - 28 pts
4th place		Italy - 6 pts

The 2003 Speedway World Cup Event 2 was the second race of the 2003 Speedway World Cup season. It took place on August 4, 2003 in Outrup, Denmark.

== Results ==
Pos.	National team	Pts.
1	Australia	62
2	Great Britain	60
3	Slovenia	28
4	Italy	6

== Heat details ==
Placing	Team / Rider name	Total	1	2	3	4	5	6	7	8	9	10	11	12	13	14	15	16	17	18	19	20	21	22	23	24	25
1	Australia	62	1	3	6	9	12	15	18	21	23	25	28	31	33	35	38	40	43	46	49	49	51	53	56	59	62
1	(1) Todd Wiltshire	7	1								2				2							0		2
1	(2) Ryan Sullivan	11		2								2				2		2							3
1	(3) Leigh Adams	15			3			3									3		3							3
1	(4) Jason Crump	15				3			3				3							3							3
1	(5) Jason Lyons	14					3			3				3							3		2
2	Great Britain	60	2	5	7	9	11	13	15	17	20	23	25	27	30	33	35	36	38	40	42	48	51	54	56	58	60
2	(1) Scott Nicholls	11	2							2						3			2								2
2	(2) Lee Richardson	19		3							3						2			2		6J	3
2	(3) David Norris	12			2							3	2								2			3
2	(4) Gary Havelock	8				2		2						2								-			2
2	(5) Dean Barker	10					2		2						3			1								2
Placing	Team / Rider name	Total	1	2	3	4	5	6	7	8	9	10	11	12	13	14	15	16	17	18	19	20	21	22	23	24	25
3	Slovenia	28	3	4	4	5	6	7	7	8	9	10	11	12	13	13	13	16	17	18	19	23	24	25	26	27	28
3	(1) Matej Žagar	13	3					1					1					3				4J	1
3	(2) Izak Šantej	4		1					0					1					1					1
3	(3) Jernej Kolenko	5			0					1					1					1					1		1
3	(4) Ales Dolinar	4				1					1					0					1					1
3	(5) Denis Štojs	2					1					1					0					-					-
4	Italy	6	0	0	1	1	1	1	2	2	2	2	2	2	2	3	4	4	4	4	4	6	6	6	6	6	6
4	(1) Andrea Maida	2	0						1								1				0				0
4	(2) Simone Terenzani	0		0						0			0									-				-
4	(3) Christian Miotello	3			1						0			0				0				2J					0
4	(4) Daniele Tessari	0				E						0			0				0				0
4	(5) Simone Muratelli	1					0	0								1				0				0		0
Placing	Team / Rider name	Total	1	2	3	4	5	6	7	8	9	10	11	12	13	14	15	16	17	18	19	20	21	22	23	24	25

M - exclusion for exceeding two minute time allowance • T - exclusion for touching the tapes • X - other exclusion • E - retired or mechanical failure • F - fell

Helmet colours were permanent for each team (red, blue, white and yellow/black). Colours in tables show gate positions:
gate A – inside	gate B	gate C	gate D – outside

== See also ==
- 2003 Speedway World Cup
- motorcycle speedway
