= Ufa Speedway =

Motorcycle speedway in Ufa, Russia

Club information
- Country: Russia
- League: Soviet Union/Russian championship

Major team honours
Soviet Union champions (x11)	1962, 1964, 1967–1970, 1979, 1981–1983, 1988
Russian champions (x1)	1993

Ufa Speedway is a former motorcycle speedway team called Bashkiria Ufa, a former stadium known as the Trud Stadium and a current multi-purpose venue known as the Stroitel Stadium (Ufa).

== Trud Stadium ==
The Stadium was built in 1937 and was located on Ulitsa Lenina, which today is the current site of the Ufa Arena. It took on the name Trud, (Trud Sports Society of the Soviet Union).

The stadium had a gym, a football pitch, stands with 5,000 seats, a 400 metres cinder track for motorcycle racing, wrestling and weightlifting halls; one basketball court, two volleyball courts, two city and two hockey courts, a mini-football court, two rehabilitation centres.

The venue held association football national championship matches from 1963 to 1967 but the main pastime was speedway and ice speedway. Meetings included the Soviet Union ice championships in 1961, 1962, 1966 and 1988 and the Russian ice Championships in 1962, 1969 and 1970. Following the dissolution of the Soviet Union the stadium ran into disrepair before eventually being demolished in 2005, making way for a new multi-purpose arena known as the Ufa Arena.

== Bashkiria Ufa speedway team ==
During the inaugural season of the Soviet Union Championship in 1962, Ufa had no less than four teams competing in the league championship. Bashkiria Ufa (Bashkiria meaning Bashkortostan) won the championship and became the first champions of the Soviet Union. Other teams known as the Rockets, Comets and Meteors also participated in that first season.

The following season in 1963, there were five teams including a team called Devon Ufa/Oktyabrskya, a collaboration between the two Bashkortostan cities of Oktyabrsky and Ufa. In 1964, teams from Ufa filled the first two places in the Championship standings and Bashkiria Ufa dominated Soviet speedway from 1967 to 1970, winning four consecutive league titles.

Withe the emergence of several other clubs, particularly Turbina Balakovo, the dominance was ended but Bashkiria Ufa still went on to win five more titles before the dissolution of the Soviet Union.

The team then raced in the Russian Team Speedway Championship from 1993, winning the title and creating the distinction, whereby they won both the very first league championships of both the Soviet Union and Russia. Unfortunately, the success quickly evaporated and within just five years the team were disbanded after the 1998 season.
