= Turbina Balakovo =

Russian motorcycle speedway team

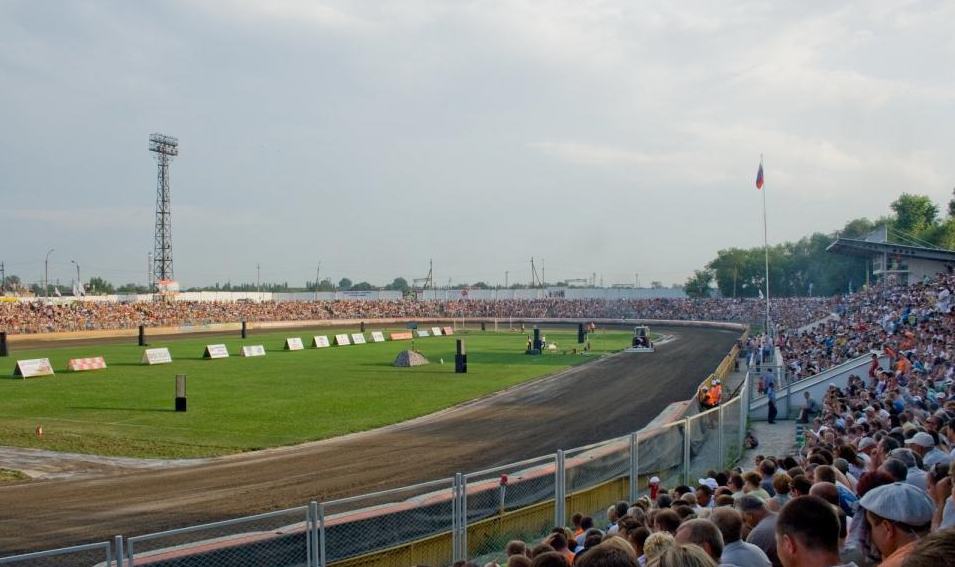
- Trud Stadium

Club information
- Track address: Trud Stadium; Sovetskaya Ulitsa, Balakovo, Saratov Oblast
- Country: Russia
- League: Russian championship
- Website: https://turbinabalakovo.ru/

Club facts
- Track size: 380m

Major team honours
Soviet Union champions (x8)	1973–1978, 1984, 1989
Russian champions (x4)	2009, 2011–2012, 20120
European Champions' Cup winners (x1)	2010

Turbina Balakovo is a Russian motorcycle speedway team based in Balakovo and who race in the Russian Speedway Championship.

== Stadium ==
The Trud Stadium, opened in 1963 and has a track circumference is 380 metres.

== History ==
The club began league speedway in 1964, shortly after the opening of the new stadium. The team raced as Kord Balakovo in the Soviet Union Championship, finishing runner-up in 1968 behind Bashkiria Ufa. The name Kord was taken from the Balakovo fiber materials plant, who manufactured many chemical products and launched the Kord-1 products in December 1962 and was unrelated to either the sports club of the same name and nearby Kord stadium.

The club ran two teams during 1967, with the second team going by the name Chemists Balakovo, also related to the chemical plant. From 1968 to 1971 the second team were known as Turbina Balakovo, named after the Saratov Hydroelectric Station that was in the process of construction at the time.

Following the completion of the station, the club ran just one team as Turbina Balakovo and proceeded to enjoy significant success. They won the Soviet Championship for six consecutive years from 1973 until 1978 and managed two more wins before the dissolution of the Soviet Union.

Following the dissolution, the team struggled to compete with Mega-Lada Togliatti and Lukoil Oktyabrsky but from 2007, performances improved and the team won the Russian Team Speedway Championship four times from 2009 to 2020.

Additionally, the team competed in the defunct European Speedway Club Champions' Cup and won the event in 2010.
