= Russian Team Speedway Championship =

Russian national team speedway competition

- Sport: Motorcycle speedway
- Founded: 1962

The Russian Team Speedway Championships is an annual motorcycle speedway event held each year and organised by the Motorcycle Federation of Russia to determine the champions of Russia.

From 1962 until 1992 the competition was for teams in the Soviet Union but then following the dissolution of the Soviet Union it became the Russian Championship. However, due to the lack of team competitions in the former Soviet Republics, several teams continued to participate in the league, most notably Lokomotiv Daugavpils of Latvia and the Rivne club of Ukraine.

From 2017 only four teams have competed in the highest division of the championship.

From 2022, the competition was somewhat isolated following the Fédération Internationale de Motocyclisme ban on Russian and Belarusian motorcycle riders, teams, officials, and competitions as a result of the 2022 Russian invasion of Ukraine.

== Past winners ==
=== Soviet Union (1962-1992) ===
Year	Winners	Runner-up	3rd place
1962	Bashkiria Ufa	Karpaty Lviv	Raduga Rivne
1963	SKA Lviv	Bashkiria Ufa	Syrena Moscow
1964	Bashkiria Ufa	Ufa Ufa	SKA Lviv
1965 not completed
1966	Neva Leningrad	SKA Lviv	Raduga Rivne
1967	Bashkiria Ufa	Salavat	Neva Leningrad
1968	Bashkiria Ufa	Kord Balakovo	Neva Leningrad
1969	Bashkiria Ufa	Vostok Vladivostok	Kord Balakovo
1970	Bashkiria Ufa	Lokomotiv Daugavpils	Siberia Novosibirsk
1971	Neva Leningrad	Lokomotiv Daugavpils	Siberia Novosibirsk
1972	Vostok Vladivostok	Turbina Balakovo	Siberia Novosibirsk
1973	Turbina Balakovo	Vostok Vladivostok	Siberia Novosibirsk
1974	Turbina Balakovo	Vostok Vladivostok	Bashkiria Ufa
1975	Turbina Balakovo	Bashkiria Ufa	Zhiguli Togliatti
1976	Turbina Balakovo	Bashkiria Ufa	Siberia Novosibirsk
1977	Turbina Balakovo	Kirovets Novosibirsk	Bashkiria Ufa
1978	Turbina Balakovo	Kirovets Novosibirsk	Bashkiria Ufa
1979	Bashkiria Ufa	Siberia Novosibirsk	Turbina Balakovo
1980	Siberia Novosibirsk	Bashkiria Ufa	Turbina Balakovo
1981	Bashkiria Ufa	Siberia Novosibirsk	Turbina Balakovo
1982	Bashkiria Ufa	Siberia Novosibirsk	Neftyanik Oktyabrsky
1983	Bashkiria Ufa	Neftyanik Oktyabrsky	Barricade Leningrad
1984	Turbina Balakovo	Bashkiria Ufa	Siberia Novosibirsk
1985	Signal Rivne	Turbina Balakovo	Bashkiria Ufa
1986	Signal Rivne	Zhiguli Togliatti	Kuzbass Kemerovo
1987	Signal Rivne	Turbina Balakovo	Kuzbass Kemerovo
1988	Bashkiria Ufa	Kuzbass Kemerovo	Turbina Balakovo
1989	Turbina Balakovo	Vostok Vladivostok	Bashkiria Ufa
1990	Vostok Vladivostok	SKA Lviv	Turbina Balakovo
1991	SKA Lviv	Turbina Balakovo	Vostok Vladivostok
1992	Fantastic Rivne	Turbina Balakovo	Vostok Vladivostok

=== Russia ===
Year	Winners	Runner-up	3rd place
1993	Bashkiria Ufa	Stroitel Oktyabrsky	Monolith Cherkessk
1994	Zhiguli Togliatti	Stroitel Oktyabrsky	Salavat
1995	Mega-Lada Togliatti	Lukoil Ufa	Lokomotiv Daugavpils
1996	Mega-Lada Togliatti	Vostok Vladivostok	Lokomotiv Daugavpils
1997	Lukoil Oktyabrsky	Mega-Lada Togliatti	Vostok Vladivostok
1998	Mega-Lada Togliatti	Lukoil Oktyabrsky	Vostok Vladivostok
1999	Lukoil Oktyabrsky	Mega-Lada Togliatti	Vostok Vladivostok
2000	Lukoil Oktyabrsky	Mega-Lada Togliatti	Vostok Vladivostok
2001	Mega-Lada Togliatti	Lukoil Oktyabrsky	Lokomotiv Daugavpils
2002	Mega-Lada Togliatti	Lukoil Oktyabrsky	Lokomotiv Daugavpils
2003	Mega-Lada Togliatti	Lukoil Oktyabrsky	Vostok Vladivostok
2004	Mega-Lada Togliatti	Lukoil Oktyabrsky	Salavat
2005	Mega-Lada Togliatti	Lukoil Oktyabrsky	Vostok Vladivostok
2006	Mega-Lada Togliatti	Lukoil Oktyabrsky	Vostok Vladivostok
2007	Mega-Lada Togliatti	Turbina Balakovo	Vostok Vladivostok
2008	Mega-Lada Togliatti	Vostok Vladivostok	Turbina Balakovo
2009	Turbina Balakovo	Vostok Vladivostok	Mega-Lada Togliatti
2010	Vostok Vladivostok	Turbina Balakovo	Mega-Lada Togliatti
2011	Turbina Balakovo	Vostok Vladivostok	Mega-Lada Togliatti
2012	Turbina Balakovo	Mega-Lada Togliatti	Vostok Vladivostok
2013	Mega-Lada Togliatti	Vostok Vladivostok	Turbina Balakovo
2014	Mega-Lada Togliatti	Vostok Vladivostok	Turbina Balakovo
2015	Vostok Vladivostok	Turbina Balakovo	Mega-Lada Togliatti
2016	Vostok Vladivostok	Turbina Balakovo	Mega-Lada Togliatti
2017	Mega-Lada Togliatti	Turbina Balakovo	Vostok Vladivostok
2018	Vostok Vladivostok	Turbina Balakovo	Mega-Lada Togliatti
2019	Vostok Vladivostok	Mega-Lada Togliatti	Turbina Balakovo
2020	Turbina Balakovo	Mega-Lada Togliatti	Vostok Vladivostok
2021	Mega-Lada Togliatti	Turbina Balakovo	Vostok Vladivostok
2022	Vostok Vladivostok	Turbina Balakovo	Mega-Lada Togliatti
2023	Mega-Lada Togliatti	Vostok Vladivostok	Turbina Balakovo

== See also ==
- Soviet Union national speedway team
- Russia national speedway team
- Russian Individual Speedway Championship
