= Vladimir Trofimov =

Soviet speedway rider

- Born: 28 January 1962 (age 64); Leningrad, Soviet Union
- Nationality: Soviet/Ukrainian

Career history

Soviet Union
- 1980–2012: Rivne

Individual honours
- 1988: Soviet Union national champion
- 1982, 1989, 1992, 2004: Ukraine national champion

Vladimir Trofimov (born 28 January 1962) is a former international motorcycle speedway rider from the Soviet Union and later Ukraine. He was the champion of the Soviet Union in 1988 and represented both the Soviet Union and Ukraine national teams.

== Speedway career ==
Trofimov was born in Leningrad, Soviet Union and pursued a career in speedway because his father Viktor Trofimov was an international rider. It was during the late 1960s that his father began riding in Ukraine for the Rivne Speedway team who competed in Soviet team championship.

Based in Ukraine, Trofimov also began riding for the team in 1980 and continued to ride for them up to the dissolution of the Soviet Union. Following the dissolution the family remained in Ukraine and Trofimov represented the Ukraine national speedway team. Trofimov's son Viktor Jr. would also represent the Ukraine national team before taking out a Polish licence.

Trofimov reached the finals of the 1982 Individual Speedway Junior European Championship and the 1983 Individual Speedway Junior European Championship

Trofimov was the Soviet Union Individual Speedway champion in 1988 and became the Soviet team captain. He was also a four-time champion of Ukraine, winning the national championship in 1982, 1989, 1992 and 2004.

Trofimov would continue to ride for Rivne until the age of 50 in 2012, spending a remarkable 32 years at the club. Additionally, during the later stages of his career he became a Speedway longtrack and grasstrack rider and competed in the 1997 Individual Long Track World Championship.

Trofimov later became the president of the Rivne Speedway team.

== World Final Appearances ==
=== Individual World Championship ===
- 1987 - (Netherlands) Amsterdam, Olympic Stadium - reserve - did not ride
