= Rivne Speedway =

Ukrainian motorcycle speedway team

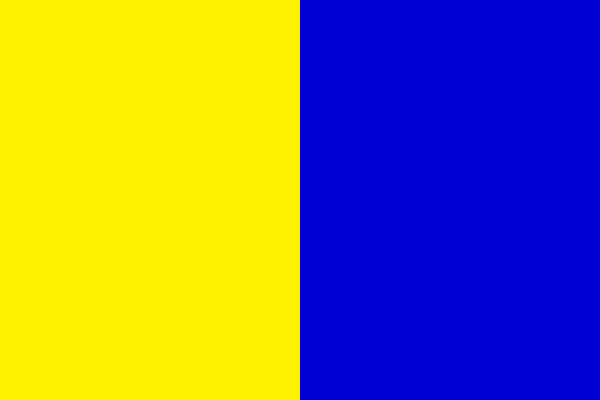

Club information
- Track address: Rivne Speedway Stadium; Volodymyr Stelmakh St, 3 Rivne, Rivne Oblast
- Country: Ukraine
- Founded: 1959

Club facts
- Track size: 360 metres
- Track record time: 65.18 sec
- Track record date: 2019
- Track record holder: Jan Kvěch

Major team honours
Soviet Union champions	1985, 1986, 1987, 1992
Soviet Union bronze medal	1962, 1966
European Club Champions	2009

Rivne Speedway or Rivne City Sports and Technical Club, is a Ukrainian motorcycle speedway team based in Rivne.

== Stadium ==
Rivne Speedway Stadium is located at Volodymyr Stelmakh St, 3, in Rivne. Its capacity is 15,000 and the track is 360 metres in circumference.

== History ==
The club began league speedway in 1962, as part of the inaugural Soviet Union Championship and won the bronze medal during the first year of competition. During the initial 18 years of league competition, the team used the name Raduga Rivne, the origins of which were either a name chosen by the Soviet authorities to promote companies (which was common practice for sports teams at the time) or simply the name chosen by the club translating as Rainbow. However, the team won another bronze medal during that period in 1966.

The team did not compete in the league during 1979 but returned in 1980, racing as Signal Rivne. The stadium that the club were based at underwent a significant reconstruction in 1983, which propelled the team to success, helping them win the championship of the Soviet Union for three consecutive years from 1985 to 1987.

It was not until the fall of Real socialism in the Eastern Bloc countries, that clubs began to choose names of their own, Signal Rivne became Fantastic Rivne and they won the final championship under the Soviet Union flag.

Following the dissolution of the Soviet Union the team were left in limbo due to the lack of a serious team competition in Ukraine but did race in the now defunct European Speedway Club Champions' Cup under various names. It was not until 2003 that they were accepted into the Russian Team Speedway Championship, competing as Ukraine Rivne until the end of the 2006 season. The team withdrew from the Russian leagues to join the Team Speedway Polish Championship but struggled financially to survive in the 2.Liga. They did however win the 2009 European Speedway Club Champions' Cup.

Since 2011, the team have sporadically raced, participating in events such as the Speedway Friendship Cup, featuring clubs from Europe.

Following the Russian invasion of Ukraine in February 2022, the future of the club is unknown.

== Results ==
Champions' Cup competition

- 1998 - 6th place (as SC Rivne)
- 1999 - 7th place (as SC Rivne)
- 2000 - 7th place (as Signal Rivne)
- 2001 - 6th place (as Tekhnik Rivne)
- 2004 - 8th place (as SK Trofimov)
- 2005 - 6th place (as SK Rivne)
- 2006 - =6th place (as Ukraina Rivne)
- 2007 - =9th place (as Ukraina Rivne)
- 2009 - champions (as Kaskad Rivne)

Polish Speedway Championship

- 2005 - 3rd in 2.Liga
- 2006 - 5th in 2.Liga
- 2008 - 3rd in 2.Liga
- 2011 - 6th in 2.Liga
