= Salavat Speedway =

Motorcycle speedway in Salavat, Russia

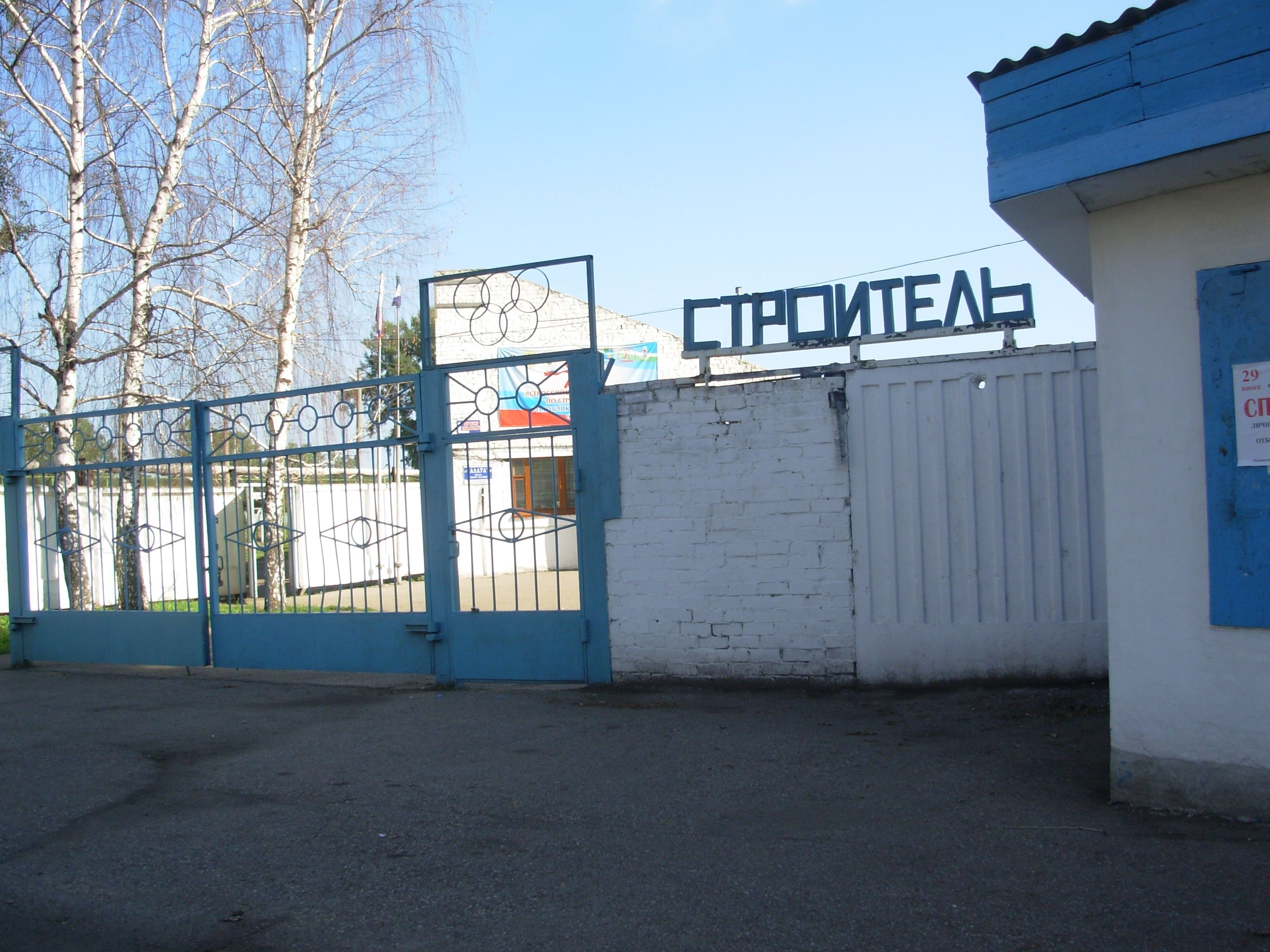
- Stroitel Stadium entrance

Club information
- Country: Russia
- League: Russian championship

Major team honours
Soviet Union championship silver medal	1967
Russian championship bronze medal	1994, 2004

Salavat Speedway is a motorcycle speedway team and a multi-purpose venue known as the Stroitel Stadium.

== Stroitel Stadium ==
The Stroitel Stadium is located on Ulitsa Revolyutsionnaya, 3, in the Central Park of Culture and Recreation, which is on the eastern edge of the city and also incorporates the 50th Anniversary of October Stadium. The Stroitel stadium was constructed in 1959 and hosts football and athletics, in addition to speedway. In winter, the football field is flooded and an ice skating rink is in operation.

The stadium has also hosted ice speedway and in particular held the final of the 1968 Individual Ice Speedway World Championship on the 20 and 21 February 1968, won by Gabdrakhman Kadyrov of the Soviet Union.

In 2008, a major renovation of the stadium was carried out and in 2011, the stadium hosted the Russian Archery Championship. Outside of the stadium there is a monument statue in memory of speedway rider Alexander Baskakov, who died following an operation after a crash on the track in 1990.

== Salavat speedway team ==
The speedway team were founded in 1963 and competed in the second edition of the Soviet Union Championship. In 1967, the team won the bronze medal in the championship.

Following the dissolution of the Soviet Union the team raced in the Russian Team Speedway Championship, winning the bronze medal again in 1994 and 2004 respectively.

During the 2014 championships, the team were unable to complete their fixtures dur to financial issues and withdrew from the league but have since returned but now race in the lower division.
