= European Speedway Club Champions' Cup =

Annual motorcycle speedway event

- UEM logo
- Sport: Motorcycle speedway
- Most titles: Mega-Lada Togliatti (4)

The European Speedway Club Champions' Cup was an annual speedway event held in different countries and organised by the European Motorcycle Union (UEM) from 1998 to 2011.

The competition involved mainly Eastern European countries. Only Poland from the 'Big four' leagues entered teams to compete in the competition, with the British, Swedish and Danish leagues choosing not to compete.

== Previous winners ==
Year	Venue	Winners	Runner-up	3rd place	Ref
1998	(Poland) Bydgoszcz	(Poland) Polonia Bydgoszcz	(Czech Republic) Olymp Prague	(Russia) Lukoil Oktyabrsky	
1999	(Germany) Diedenbergen	(Poland) Polonia Bydgoszcz	(Germany) MSC Diedenbergen	(Russia) Mega-Lada Togliatti	
2000	(Poland) Piła	(Poland) Polonia Piła	(Russia) Lukoil Oktyabrsky	(Germany) AC Landshut	
2001	(Latvia) Daugavpils	(Poland) Polonia Bydgoszcz	(Russia) Lukoil Oktyabrsky	(Latvia) Lokomotiv Daugavpils	
2002	(Czech Republic) Pardubice	(Russia) Mega-Lada Togliatti	(Czech Republic) AMK Pardubice	(Poland) Apator Toruń	
2003	(Hungary) Debrecen	(Russia) Mega-Lada Togliatti	(Hungary) Hajdu Volan Debrecen	(Slovenia) AMTK Ljubljana	
2004	(Slovenia) Ljubljana	(Poland) Włókniarz Częstochowa	(Russia) Mega-Lada Togliatti	(Slovenia) AMTK Ljubljana	
2005	(Russia) Tolyatti	(Russia) Mega-Lada Togliatti	(Latvia) Lokomotiv Daugavpils	(Russia) Russian Reserve Team	
2006	(Poland) Tarnów	(Poland) Unia Tarnów	(Russia) Mega-Lada Togliatti	(Hungary) Simon&Wolf Debrecen	
2007	(Hungary) Miskolc	(Hungary) Speedway Miskolc	(Poland) Atlas Wrocław	(Russia) Mega-Lada Togliatti	
2008	(Czech Republic) Slaný	(Russia) Mega-Lada Togliatti	(Hungary) Simon&Wolf Debrecen	(Czech Republic) AK Slaný	
2009	(Poland) Toruń	(Ukraine) Kaskad Rivne	(Poland) Unibax Toruń	(Russia) Vostok Vladivostok	
2010	(Hungary) Miskolc	(Russia) Turbina Balakovo	(Hungary) Speedway Miskolc	(Poland) Falubaz Zielona Góra	
2011	(Russia) Balakovo	(Russia) Vostok Vladivostok	(Ukraine) Shakhtar Chervonograd	(Latvia) Lokomotiv Daugavpils	

== Medals classification ==
Pos	Country	Total	Gold	Silver	Bronze
1.	Russia	15	6	4	5
2.	Poland	10	6	2	2
3.	Hungary	5	1	3	1
4.	Ukraine	1	1	1	
5.	Czech Republic	3		2	1
6.	Latvia	3		1	2
	Germany	2		1	1
8.	Slovenia	2			2

== See also ==
- Motorcycle speedway
