= Mega-Lada Togliatti =

Russian motorcycle speedway team

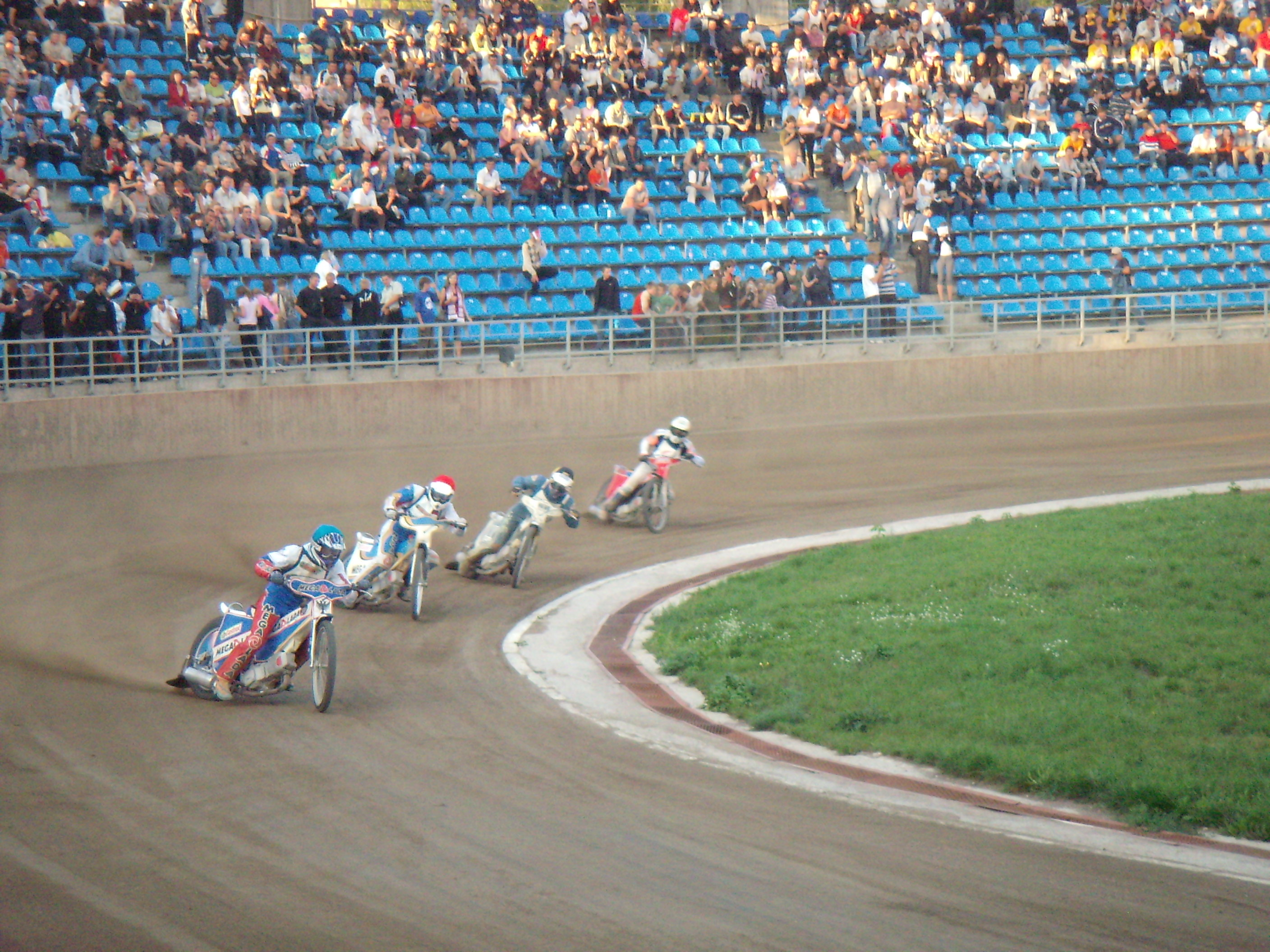
- Mega-Lada Togliatti competing in a match during 2007

Club information
- Track address: Anatoly Stepanov Stadium; Ulitsa Rodiny, 40, Tolyatti, Samara Oblast
- Country: Russia
- Founded: 1967
- League: Russian championship

Club facts
- Track size: 353 metres

Major team honours
Russian champions (x17)	1994–1996, 2001–2008, 2013–2014, 2017, 2021, 2023
European Champions' Cup winners (x4)	2002, 2003, 2005, 2008.

Mega-Lada Togliatti is a Russian motorcycle speedway team based in Tolyatti and who race in the Russian Speedway Championship.

== Stadium ==
The Anatoly Stepanov Stadium, formerly the Stroitel Stadium is located at Ulitsa Rodiny, 40 in Tolyatti. Its capacity is 15,000 seats and has a track circumference of 353 metres.

== History ==
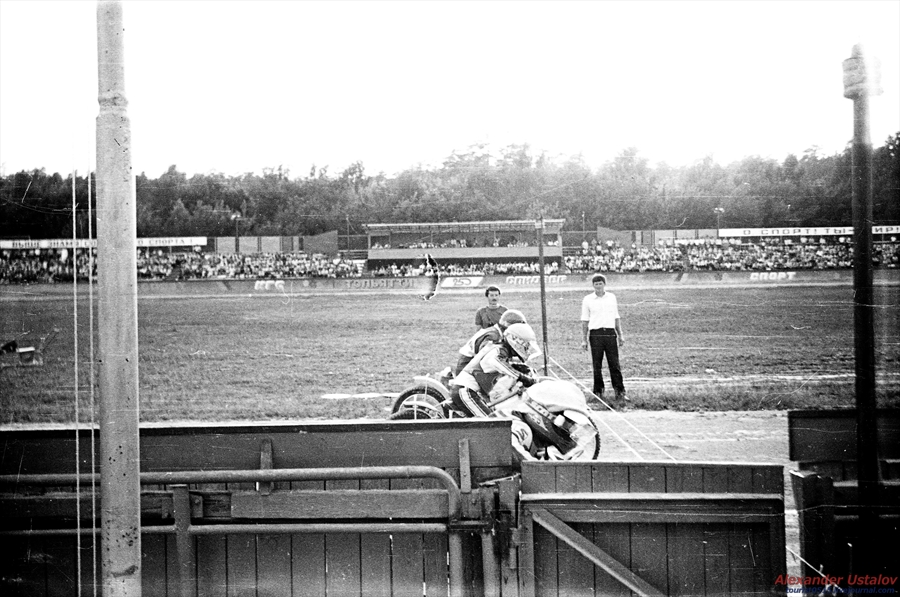
A race start at the stadium during 1986

The club began league speedway in 1967, as part of the Soviet Union Championship and raced as Zhiguli Togliatti from 1967 to 1992. The team's best league season was in 1986 after they finished runner-up behind Signal Rivne. The name Zhiguli was a brand of car manufactured by AvtoVAZ at the time.

Following the dissolution of the Soviet Union the team raced in the Russian Team Speedway Championship. In 1995, a name change came as a result of the AvtoVAz company making the Lada brand of car. They were known as Mega-Lada Togliatti and would become the most successful club in Russia, winning a record 17 championships from 1994 to 2023.

Additionally, the team competed in the defunct European Speedway Club Champions' Cup and won the event four times in 2002, 2003, 2005 and 2008.

== Champions' Cup record ==
- 1999 - 3rd place
- 2002 - champions
- 2003 - champions
- 2004 - 2nd place
- 2005 - champions
- 2006 - 2nd place
- 2007 - 3rd place
- 2008 - champions
