= Rivne Speedway Stadium =

Stadium in Rivne, Ukraine

- Location: Volodymyr Stelmakh St, 3, Rivne, Rivne Oblast, Ukraine, 33000
- Coordinates: 50°36′19″N 26°16′39″E
- Capacity: 15,000
- Opened: 24 May 1959

Oval
- Length: 0.36 km (0.22 mi)
- Race lap record: 65.18 sec (Jan Kvěch, 2019)

Rivne Speedway Stadium or Rivenenskyy Mototrek is a motorcycle speedway stadium in the south east of Rivne. It is located on the Volodymyr Stelmakh Street. The speedway club Rivne Speedway are based at the track.

== History ==
The stadium opened on 24 May 1959 as the Rivne Technical Sports Stadium. Yuri Korkhov, the head of DOSAAF at the time, was instrumental in overseeing the project after 20 hectares of land were identified for the build.

In September 1974, a major renovation took place and in 1983, following several requests from the speedway management to Moscow, a complete reconstruction of the Rivne stadium took place. The new track propelled the speedway team to success, helping them win the championship of the Soviet Union for three consecutive years from 1985 to 1987.

The venue has hosted significant speedway events including a qualifying round of the Speedway World Championship in 1962 and 1991.

The team Rivne Speedway raced in the Team Speedway Polish Championship in 2005, 2006 and 2008 and the stadium has continued to hold various international meetings.

== Major meetings ==
- 1962 World Championship qualifier
- 1986 Individual Speedway Junior European Championship
- 1991 World Championship qualifier
- 2006 European Pairs Speedway Championship
- 2012 European Pairs Speedway Championship
- 2019 Individual Speedway Junior European Championship

== Track records ==
- 18 September 1983 Viktor Kuznetsov 73.2 sec
- 18 September 1983 Viktor Kuznetsov 73.0 sec
- 22 October 1983 Airat Faizullin 72.9 sec
- 22 October 1983 Mikhail Starostin 72.8 sec
- 23 October 1983 Vladimir Smirnov 72.5 sec
- 23 October 1983 Mikhail Starostin 72.4 sec
- 22 July 1984 Jiří Štancl 71.8 sec
- 22 July 1984 Zenon Plech 70.4 sec
- 13 June 1987 Zaytun Gafurov 69.0 sec
- 11 August 1991 Roman Matoušek 68.4 sec
- 11 August 1991 Mikael Blixt 68.2 sec
- 11 August 1991 Jimmy Nilsen 67.4 sec
- 11 August 1991 Billy Hamill 66.6 sec
- 6 May 2009 Simon Vlasov 66.42 sec
- 12 May 2009 Vladimir Dubinin 66.31 sec
- 22 September 2012 Andrey Karpov 65.88 sec
- 2019 Jan Kvěch 65.18 sec
