= Vladivostok Speedway =

Motorcycle speedway in Vladivostok, Russia

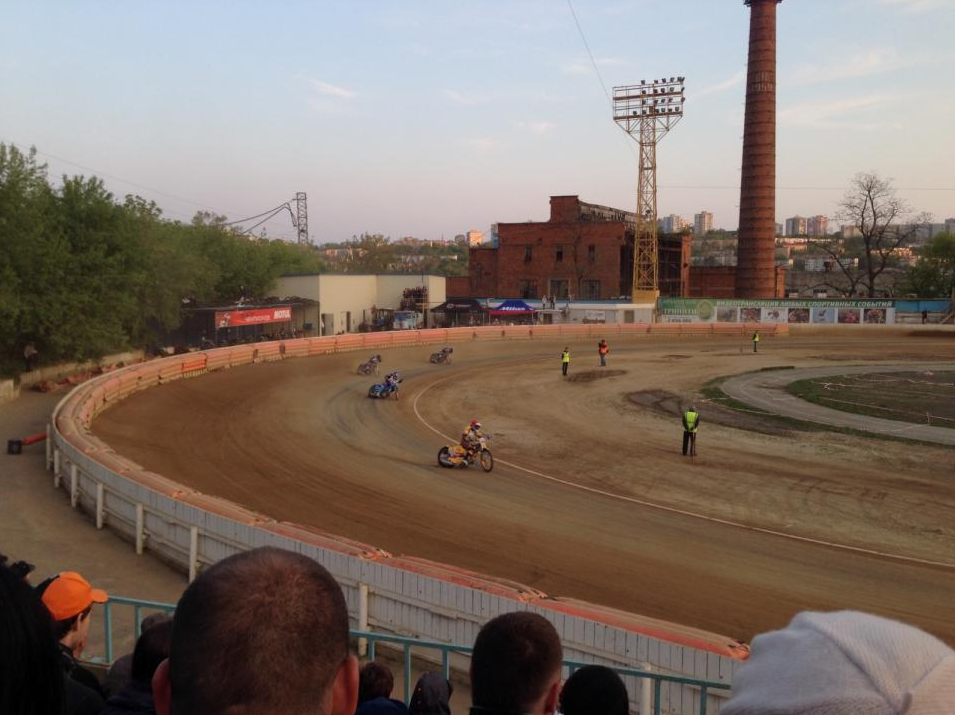
- The team racing at the Avangard Stadium

Club information
- Country: Russia
- League: Russian championship

Major team honours
| Soviet Union champions (x2) | 1972, 1990 |
| Russian champions (x6) | 2010, 2015–2016, 2018–2019, 2022 |
| European Champions' Cup winners (x1) | 2011 |

Vladivostok Speedway is a motorcycle speedway team called Vostok Vladivostok and the multi-purpose Avangard Stadium that hosts speedway.

== Avangard Stadium ==
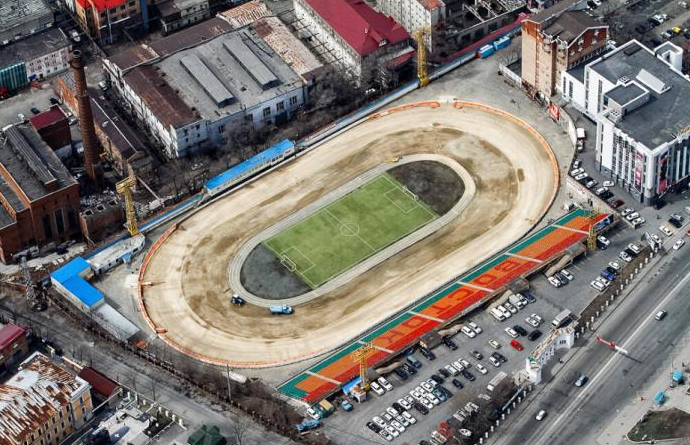
Aerial view of the Avangard Stadium

The Avangard Stadium is located on Ulitsa Kapitana Shefnera, 2, which is just north of the Zolotoy Rog. The stadium was constructed between 1960 and 1962 but was not used for speedway from 1986 to 1998. It re-opened for speedway in 1999 on a restored track.

In 2020, the stadium owners announced plans for a two-stage renovation, starting with the removal of administrative buildings. In June 2021, an athletics track was added in addition to football and basketball facilities inside the speedway track. Other improvements included the construction of a new administration building with an amenity complex and motorcycle maintenance area. The speedway track received new lighting and fencing. The second stage increased seating to 7,000 spectators, with a canopy above. While the renovation took place the speedway was held at the Sergei Petrovich Shevchenko Stadium in Ussuriysk.

== Vostok Vladivostok ==
The speedway team known as Vostok Vladivostok were founded in 1960 by three motorcycle riders Rudolf Bogdanov, Viktor Uspensky and Vadim Kharamonov. The team competed in the inaugural 1962 Soviet Union Championship and won the league title in 1972 and 1990.

Following the dissolution of the Soviet Union the team raced in the Russian Team Speedway Championship winning the Championships six times from 2010 to 2022.

Additionally, the team were the last winners of the defunct European Speedway Club Champions' Cup in 2011.
