= Oktyabrsky Speedway =

Motorcycle speedway in Oktyabrsky, Russia

Coordinates: 54.48772°N 53.45229°E

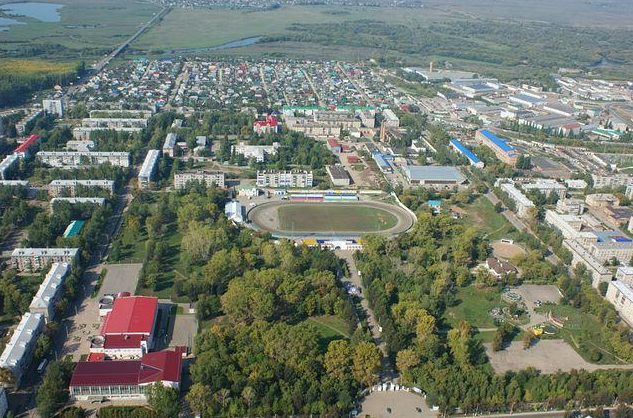
- aerial view of the Netfyanik Stadium

Club information
- Track address: Neftyanik Stadium; Gorodskoy Park; Komsomol'skaya Ulitsa, 206; Oktyabrsky, Bashkortostan
- Country: Russia
- Founded: 1963
- League: Russian championship

Major team honours
| Russian league champions (x3) | 1997, 1999, 2000 |

Oktyabrsky Speedway is a motorcycle speedway team based in Oktyabrsky, Bashkortostan and who race in the Russian Speedway Championship.

== Stadium ==
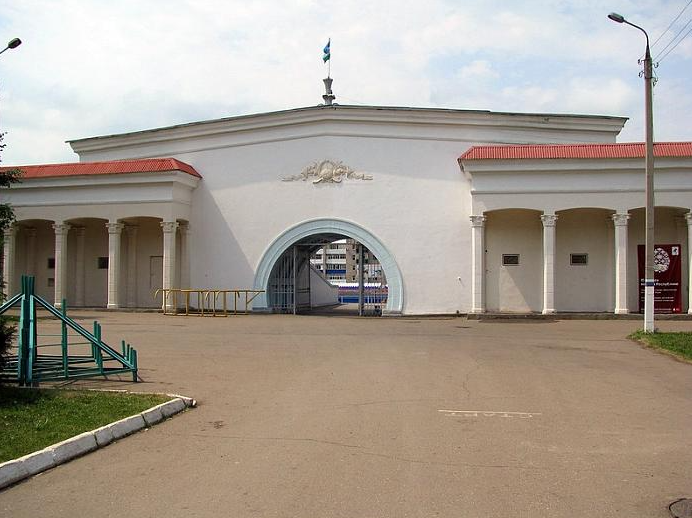
Stadium entrance

The Neftyanik Stadium, has a capacity of 7,000 spectators and opened on 25 August 1962. It is located at Gorodskoy Park on Komsomol'skaya Ulitsa, 206.

== History ==
The club began life in 1963 as a collaboration between the two Bashkortostan cities of Oktyabrsky and Ufa. The team known as Devon Ufa Oktyabrsky was formed by R. Yulbarisov, M. Vorsin and U. Gilyazetdinov and competed in the second season of the Soviet Union Championship. However, after just one season the team folded before returning in 1970. Headed by Yuri Gavrilovich Khramov the new team raced as Burovik (Drillers) Oktyabrsky for two years (the name was due to the nearby Volga-Ural oil and natural-gas region and finance from the Tuymazaburneft trust). From 1972 the team raced as Neftyanik Oktyabrsky. The team later received finance from the Bashneft association. Neftyanik Oktyabrsky secured their first notable success in 1982, when winning the bronze medal and fared better the following season by winning the silver medal in 1983.

The team were known as Stroitel Oktyabrsky just before the dissolution of the Soviet Union and afterwards until 1995 and twice won the silver medal in 1993 and 1994. In 1996, a major sponsor was secured and the team's fortunes changed significantly. The PJSC Lukoil Oil Company (known as Lukoil) became principal sponsors and the team adopted the name Lukoil Oktyabrsky. The team won the Russian Team Speedway Championship three times from in 1997, 1999 and 2000 and only Mega-Lada Togliatti stopped them from winning many more.

Additionally, the team competed in the defunct European Speedway Club Champions' Cup and finished runner-up in the event in 2000 and 2001.

From 2008, the club suffered problems with Lukoil terminating their sponsorship and racing as SK Oktyabrsky financial issues resulted in the team disbanding in 2013. However, the Oktyabrsky Sports and Technical Club was created and by 2017 had returned to racing. In 2019, another name change was orchestrated, this time to STK Bashkiria (based on the region Bashkortostan). From 2019 to 2023, the team have finished fourth out of four every year in the championship.
