= Gázvezeték Street Sports Complex =

Stadium in Debrecen, Hungary

- Location: Gázvezeték u., 4030, Debrecen, Hungary
- Coordinates: 47°30′41″N 21°37′09″E
- Capacity: 7,000

Gázvezeték Street Sports Complex (Hungarian: Gázvezeték utcai Sporttelep) is a motorcycle speedway track, located in Debrecen. The stadium has been known by various other names including the Hajdú Volán Stadion and more recently the Perényi Pál Salakmotor Stadion.

The stadium is located on Gázvezeték Street in the south of Debrecen.

The venue hosts the speedway team Debrecen Speedway team, who compete in the Hungarian Team Speedway Championship. The team have been known by various names, clubs or promotions over the years, including Debrecen S.C, Hajdú Volán SC, Simon & Wolf SC and since 2019, the Speedwaywolf Debrecen team.

The sports complex has hosted a large number of major events, including eight rounds of the Speedway World Team Cup and the Speedway World Cup in 1973, 1975, 1981, 1983, 1986, 1991, 1997 and 2001 respectively. It has also staged rounds of the Speedway World Pairs Championship in 1972 and 1978 and the Continental Speedway final in 1989 and 1998.
