= 2000 Speedway Grand Prix of Europe =

(Poland) 2000 Speedway Grand Prix of Europe

Information
- Date: 23 September 2000
- City: (Poland) Bydgoszcz
- Event: 6 of 6 (36)
- Referee: (United Kingdom) Anthony Steele

Stadium details
- Stadium: Polonia Stadium
- Length: 348 m (381 yd)
- Track: speedway track

SGP Results
- Best Time
- (gold) Winner: (United States) Billy Hamill
- (silver) Runner-up: (United States) Greg Hancock
- (bronze) 3rd place: (Sweden) Tony Rickardsson

The 2000 Speedway Grand Prix of Europe was the sixth and the last race of the 2000 Speedway Grand Prix season. It took place on 23 September in the Polonia Stadium in Bydgoszcz, Poland

== Starting positions draw ==
The Speedway Grand Prix Commission nominated Polish rider Jaroslaw Hampel and a Piotr Protasiewicz as Wild Card.

== Heat details ==
Placing	Draw	Rider	Total	Pre-Main Event										Main Event										Final Event
Placing	Draw	Rider	Total	Round 1						Round 2				Round 1						Round 2				1/2		CF	F
Placing	Draw	Rider	Total	1	2	3	4	5	6	7	8	9	10	11	12	13	14	15	16	17	18	19	20	21	22	23	24
1	5	(United States) (11) Billy Hamill	25														2			4			1		2		1
2	1	(United States) (7) Greg Hancock	20											2							2			1			2
3	10	(Sweden) (1) Tony Rickardsson	18		1						1				1						1				1		3
4	2	(Australia) (6) Jason Crump	16												4			1				1		2			4
5	12	(Poland) (2) Tomasz Gollob	15				2			1				1						1				4		1
6	4	(United Kingdom) (16) Mark Loram	14														3		1				2	3		2
7	18	(Australia) (21) Todd Wiltshire	12		2					2					2					2					3	3
8	7	(Sweden) (15) Henrik Gustafsson	10												3				2			2			4	4
9	19	(Sweden) (3) Jimmy Nilsen	8			4			1				2			1				3		3
10	11	(United Kingdom) (4) Joe Screen	8			1				4M			1				1				3		3
11	9	(Sweden) (19) Peter Karlsson	7	1						3		1				2					4X	4
12	24	(Poland) (24) Jarosław Hampel	7	4					2			2					4	2					4
13	6	(Australia) (5) Leigh Adams	6													3		3
14	8	(Australia) (8) Ryan Sullivan	6											4					3
15	22	(Poland) (22) Rafał Dobrucki	5			2					2			3				4
DSQ	3	(Sweden) (9) Stefan Dannö														4N			4N
Placing	Draw	Rider	Total	1	2	3	4	5	6	7	8	9	10	11	12	13	14	15	16	17	18	19	20	21	22	23	24
17	14	(United Kingdom) (10) Chris Louis	4			3		2					3
18	13	(Czech Republic) (18) Antonín Kasper, Jr.	4				4	1				3
19	17	(United Kingdom) (13) Carl Stonehewer	3	2							4	4
20	21	(United Kingdom) (17) Andy Smith	3				1				3		4
21	15	(Sweden) (12) Mikael Karlsson	2		3				3
22	16	(Denmark) (20) Brian Andersen	2	3				3
23	20	(Denmark) (14) Brian Karger	1				3		4
24	23	(Poland) (23) Piotr Protasiewicz	1		4F			4T

Heats 1-10: Pre-Main Event 1-4: First round 5-6: Last chance for second round 7-8: Second round 9-10: Last chance Main Event	Heats 11-20: Main Event 11-14: First round 15-16: Last chance for second round 17-18: Second round 19-20: Last chance for Semi-Finals	Heats 21-24: Final Event 21-22: Semi-Finals 23: Consolation Final 24: The Big Final

gate A – inside	gate B	gate C	gate D – outside

== Final standings ==
Qualifies for next season's Grand Prix series
Full-time Grand Prix rider
Wild card, track reserve or qualified reserve

Pos.	Rider	Points	CZE (Czech Republic)	SWE (Sweden)	POL (Poland)	GBR (United Kingdom)	DEN (Denmark)	EUR (Poland)
Gold	(United Kingdom) (16) Mark Loram	102	20	20	15	18	15	14
Silver	(United States) (11) Billy Hamill	95	25	6	20	5	14	25
Bronze	(Sweden) (1) Tony Rickardsson	94	14	16	25	14	7	18
4	(Australia) (6) Jason Crump	88	5	25	12	10	20	16
5	(United States) (7) Greg Hancock	76	7	5	7	12	25	20
6	(Australia) (5) Leigh Adams	65	6	10	16	15	12	6
7	(Poland) (2) Tomasz Gollob	64	15	14	14	–	6	15
8	(Australia) (21) Todd Wiltshire	63	16	18	7	7	3	12
9	(Australia) (8) Ryan Sullivan	62	8	12	8	20	8	6
10	(United Kingdom) (10) Chris Louis	60	18	7	18	8	5	4
11	(Sweden) (3) Jimmy Nilsen	42	6	15	5	6	2	8
12	(Sweden) (9) Stefan Dannö	41	3	4	10	6	18	0
13	(Sweden) (12) Mikael Karlsson	39	12	8	4	8	5	2
14	(Sweden) (15) Henrik Gustafsson	39	8	4	2	5	10	10
15	(Sweden) (19) Peter Karlsson	35	3	2	8	7	8	7
16	(United Kingdom) (4) Joe Screen	34	5	5	6	3	7	8
17	(Czech Republic) (18) Antonín Kasper, Jr.	32	7	6	5	4	6	4
18	(United Kingdom) (13) Carl Stonehewer	30	10	7	3	4	3	3
19	(United Kingdom) (23) Martin Dugard	25	–	–	–	25	–	–
20	(Denmark) (23) Nicki Pedersen	17	–	1	–	–	16	–
21	(Poland) (22) Rafał Dobrucki	16	4	3	3	–	1	5
22	(Australia) (28) Jason Lyons	16	–	–	–	16	–	–
23	(Denmark) (20) Brian Andersen	15	4	2	1	2	4	2
24	(Denmark) (14) Brian Karger	13	2	3	4	1	2	1
25	(United Kingdom) (17) Andy Smith	10	2	1	1	2	1	3
26	(Norway) (24) Rune Holta	8	–	8	–	–	–	–
27	(Poland) (24) Jarosław Hampel	7	–	–	–	–	–	7
28	(Poland) (24) Sebastian Ułamek	6	–	–	6	–	–	–
29	(Denmark) (24) Jesper B. Jensen	4	–	–	–	–	4	–
30	(Poland) (23) Piotr Protasiewicz	3	–	–	2	–	–	1
31	(United Kingdom) (24) Lee Richardson	3	–	–	–	3	–	–
32	(Czech Republic) (23) Michal Makovský	1	1	–	–	–	–	–
33	(Czech Republic) (24) Bohumil Brhel	1	1	–	–	–	–	–
34	(Denmark) (25) John Jørgensen	1	–	–	–	1	–	–
Pos.	Rider	Points	CZE (Czech Republic)	SWE (Sweden)	POL (Poland)	GBR (United Kingdom)	DEN (Denmark)	EUR (Poland)

== See also ==
- Speedway Grand Prix
- List of Speedway Grand Prix riders
