= 2000 Speedway Grand Prix of Denmark =

Information
- Date: 2 September 2000
- City: (Denmark) Vojens
- Event: 5 of 6 (35)
- Referee: (United Kingdom) Anthony Steele

Stadium details
- Stadium: Speedway Center
- Track: speedway track

SGP Results
- Best Time
- (gold) Winner: (United States) Greg Hancock
- (silver) Runner-up: (Australia) Jason Crump
- (bronze) 3rd place: (Sweden) Stefan Dannö

The 2000 Speedway Grand Prix of Denmark was the fifth race of the 2000 Speedway Grand Prix season. It took place on 2 September in the Speedway Center in Vojens, Denmark

== Starting positions draw ==
The Speedway Grand Prix Commission nominated Danish rider Nicki Pedersen and a Jesper B. Jensen as Wild Card.

== Heat details ==
Placing	Draw	Rider	Total	Pre-Main Event										Main Event										Final Event
Placing	Draw	Rider	Total	Round 1						Round 2				Round 1						Round 2				1/2		CF	F
Placing	Draw	Rider	Total	1	2	3	4	5	6	7	8	9	10	11	12	13	14	15	16	17	18	19	20	21	22	23	24
1	5	(United States) (7) Greg Hancock	25														1				1				2		1
2	6	(Australia) (6) Jason Crump	20													1				1				2			2
3	13	(Sweden) (9) Stefan Dannö	18				1				2			2							4	2			1		3
4	23	(Denmark) (23) Nicki Pedersen	16		1						1				1						2			1			4
5	2	(United Kingdom) (16) Mark Loram	15												2					2					4	1
6	14	(United States) (11) Billy Hamill	14			1				2					3				1				1		3	2
7	3	(Australia) (5) Leigh Adams	12													4			2			1		3		3
8	15	(Sweden) (15) Henrik Gustafsson	10		2					3		1				2					3		2	4		4
9	1	(Australia) (8) Ryan Sullivan	8											1						3		3
10	10	(Sweden) (19) Peter Karlsson	8		4			2					1				2			4			3
11	4	(Sweden) (1) Tony Rickardsson	7														4	1				4X
12	18	(United Kingdom) (4) Joe Screen	7		3				1				2			3		2					4
13	9	(Poland) (2) Tomasz Gollob	6	1						1				3				3
14	17	(Czech Republic) (18) Antonín Kasper, Jr.	6	3				1				2					3		3
15	7	(United Kingdom) (10) Chris Louis	5												4			4
16	8	(Sweden) (12) Mikael Karlsson	5											4					4
Placing	Draw	Rider	Total	1	2	3	4	5	6	7	8	9	10	11	12	13	14	15	16	17	18	19	20	21	22	23	24
17	20	(Denmark) (20) Brian Andersen	4				2			4			3
18	24	(Denmark) (24) Jesper B. Jensen	4	4					2			3
19	16	(United Kingdom) (13) Carl Stonehewer	3	2							3		4
20	11	(Australia) (21) Todd Wiltshire	3			2					4	4
21	12	(Sweden) (3) Jimmy Nilsen	2				3		3
22	21	(Denmark) (14) Brian Karger	2				4	3
23	19	(United Kingdom) (17) Andy Smith	1			3		4
24	22	(Poland) (22) Rafał Dobrucki	1			4			4

Heats 1-10: Pre-Main Event 1-4: First round 5-6: Last chance for second round 7-8: Second round 9-10: Last chance Main Event	Heats 11-20: Main Event 11-14: First round 15-16: Last chance for second round 17-18: Second round 19-20: Last chance for Semi-Finals	Heats 21-24: Final Event 21-22: Semi-Finals 23: Consolation Final 24: The Big Final

gate A – inside	gate B	gate C	gate D – outside

== Standings ==
Qualifies for next season's Grand Prix series
Full-time Grand Prix rider
Wild card, track reserve or qualified reserve

Pos.	Rider	Points	CZE (Czech Republic)	SWE (Sweden)	POL (Poland)	GBR (United Kingdom)	DEN (Denmark)	EUR (Poland)
1	(United Kingdom) (16) Mark Loram	88	20	20	15	18	15	
2	(Sweden) (1) Tony Rickardsson	76	14	16	25	14	7	
3	(Australia) (6) Jason Crump	72	5	25	12	10	20	
4	(United States) (11) Billy Hamill	70	25	6	20	5	14	
5	(Australia) (5) Leigh Adams	59	6	10	16	15	12	
6	(United States) (7) Greg Hancock	56	7	5	7	12	25	
7	(Australia) (8) Ryan Sullivan	56	8	12	8	20	8	
8	(United Kingdom) (10) Chris Louis	56	18	7	18	8	5	
9	(Australia) (21) Todd Wiltshire	51	16	18	7	7	3	
10	(Poland) (2) Tomasz Gollob	49	15	14	14	–	6	
11	(Sweden) (9) Stefan Dannö	41	3	4	10	6	18	
12	(Sweden) (12) Mikael Karlsson	37	12	8	4	8	5	
13	(Sweden) (3) Jimmy Nilsen	34	6	15	5	6	2	
14	(Sweden) (15) Henrik Gustafsson	29	8	4	2	5	10	
15	(Czech Republic) (18) Antonín Kasper, Jr.	28	7	6	5	4	6	
16	(Sweden) (19) Peter Karlsson	28	3	2	8	7	8	
17	(United Kingdom) (13) Carl Stonehewer	27	10	7	3	4	3	
18	(United Kingdom) (4) Joe Screen	26	5	5	6	3	7	
19	(United Kingdom) (23) Martin Dugard	25	–	–	–	25	–	
20	(Denmark) (23) Nicki Pedersen	17	–	1	–	–	16	
21	(Australia) (28) Jason Lyons	16	–	–	–	16	–	
22	(Denmark) (20) Brian Andersen	13	4	2	1	2	4	
23	(Denmark) (14) Brian Karger	12	2	3	4	1	2	
24	(Poland) (22) Rafał Dobrucki	11	4	3	3	–	1	
25	(Norway) (24) Rune Holta	8	–	8	–	–	–	
26	(United Kingdom) (17) Andy Smith	7	2	1	1	2	1	
27	(Poland) (24) Sebastian Ułamek	6	–	–	6	–	–	
28	(Denmark) (24) Jesper B. Jensen	4	–	–	–	–	4	
29	(United Kingdom) (24) Lee Richardson	3	–	–	–	3	–	
30	(Poland) (23) Piotr Protasiewicz	2	–	–	2	–	–	
31	(Czech Republic) (23) Michal Makovský	1	1	–	–	–	–	
32	(Czech Republic) (24) Bohumil Brhel	1	1	–	–	–	–	
33	(Denmark) (25) John Jørgensen	1	–	–	–	1	–	
Pos.	Rider	Points	CZE (Czech Republic)	SWE (Sweden)	POL (Poland)	GBR (United Kingdom)	DEN (Denmark)	EUR (Poland)

== See also ==
- Speedway Grand Prix
- List of Speedway Grand Prix riders
