= 2000 Speedway Grand Prix of Poland =

Information
- Date: 1 July 2000
- City: (Poland) Wrocław
- Event: 3 of 6 (33)
- Referee: (United Kingdom) Anthony Steele

Stadium details
- Stadium: Olympic Stadium
- Length: 387 m (423 yd)
- Track: speedway track

SGP Results
- Best Time
- (gold) Winner: (Sweden) Tony Rickardsson
- (silver) Runner-up: (United States) Billy Hamill
- (bronze) 3rd place: (United Kingdom) Chris Louis

The 2000 Speedway Grand Prix of Poland was the third race of the 2000 Speedway Grand Prix season. It took place on 1 July at the Olympic Stadium in Wrocław, Poland.

== Starting positions draw ==
The Speedway Grand Prix Commission nominated two Poles Piotr Protasiewicz and Sebastian Ułamek as Wild Card.

== Heat details ==
Placing	Draw	Rider	Total	Pre-Main Event										Main Event										Final Event
Placing	Draw	Rider	Total	Round 1						Round 2				Round 1						Round 2				1/2		CF	F
Placing	Draw	Rider	Total	1	2	3	4	5	6	7	8	9	10	11	12	13	14	15	16	17	18	19	20	21	22	23	24
1	4	(Sweden) (1) Tony Rickardsson	25														2			3		2			1		1
2	12	(United States) (11) Billy Hamill	20				3		1				1				1				2			1			2
3	10	(United Kingdom) (10) Chris Louis	18		1						4	1				2					3		1		2		3
4	8	(Australia) (5) Leigh Adams	16											1						4M			2	2			4
5	2	(United Kingdom) (16) Mark Loram	15												2					2					4	1
6	6	(Poland) (2) Tomasz Gollob	14													1				1				3R		2
7	1	(Australia) (6) Jason Crump	12											2							1				3	3
8	16	(Sweden) (9) Stefan Dannö	10	2							2			4					2			1		4R		4
9	7	(Australia) (8) Ryan Sullivan	8												1						4	3
10	20	(Sweden) (19) Peter Karlsson	8				2			2					4			2					3
11	15	(United States) (7) Greg Hancock	7		3R				2			2					3		1				4
12	3	(Australia) (21) Todd Wiltshire	7													3		1				4
13	14	(United Kingdom) (4) Joe Screen	6			1				1				3				3
14	24	(Poland) (24) Sebastian Ułamek	6	3				2					2			4			3
15	5	(Sweden) (3) Jimmy Nilsen	5														4R	4
16	13	(Czech Republic) (18) Antonín Kasper, Jr.	5				1				1				3				4
Placing	Draw	Rider	Total	1	2	3	4	5	6	7	8	9	10	11	12	13	14	15	16	17	18	19	20	21	22	23	24
17	9	(Sweden) (12) Mikael Karlsson	4	1						3		3
18	18	(Denmark) (14) Brian Karger	4		2					4			3
19	11	(United Kingdom) (13) Carl Stonehewer	3			2					3		4R
20	19	(Poland) (22) Rafał Dobrucki	3			3		1				4
21	17	(Sweden) (15) Henrik Gustafsson	2	4					3
22	23	(Poland) (23) Piotr Protasiewicz	2		4X			3
23	22	(United Kingdom) (17) Andy Smith	1			4			4
24	21	(Denmark) (20) Brian Andersen	1				4	4

Heats 1-10: Pre-Main Event 1-4: First round 5-6: Last chance for second round 7-8: Second round 9-10: Last chance Main Event	Heats 11-20: Main Event 11-14: First round 15-16: Last chance for second round 17-18: Second round 19-20: Last chance for Semi-Finals	Heats 21-24: Final Event 21-22: Semi-Finals 23: Consolation Final 24: The Big Final

gate A – inside	gate B	gate C	gate D – outside

== Standings ==
Qualifies for next season's Grand Prix series
Full-time Grand Prix rider
Wild card, track reserve or qualified reserve

Pos.	Rider	Points	CZE (Czech Republic)	SWE (Sweden)	POL (Poland)	GBR (United Kingdom)	DEN (Denmark)	EUR (Poland)
1	(Sweden) (1) Tony Rickardsson	55	14	16	25			
2	(United Kingdom) (16) Mark Loram	55	20	20	15			
3	(United States) (11) Billy Hamill	51	25	6	20			
4	(Poland) (2) Tomasz Gollob	43	15	14	14			
5	(United Kingdom) (10) Chris Louis	43	18	7	18			
6	(Australia) (6) Jason Crump	42	5	25	12			
7	(Australia) (21) Todd Wiltshire	41	16	18	7			
8	(Australia) (5) Leigh Adams	32	6	10	16			
9	(Australia) (8) Ryan Sullivan	28	8	12	8			
10	(Sweden) (3) Jimmy Nilsen	26	6	15	5			
11	(Sweden) (12) Mikael Karlsson	24	12	8	4			
12	(United Kingdom) (13) Carl Stonehewer	20	10	7	3			
13	(United States) (7) Greg Hancock	19	7	5	7			
14	(Czech Republic) (18) Antonín Kasper, Jr.	18	7	6	5			
15	(Sweden) (9) Stefan Dannö	17	3	4	10			
16	(United Kingdom) (4) Joe Screen	16	5	5	6			
17	(Sweden) (15) Henrik Gustafsson	14	8	4	2			
18	(Sweden) (19) Peter Karlsson	13	3	2	8			
19	(Poland) (22) Rafał Dobrucki	10	4	3	3			
20	(Denmark) (14) Brian Karger	9	2	3	4			
21	(Norway) (24) Rune Holta	8	–	8	–			
22	(Denmark) (20) Brian Andersen	7	4	2	1			
23	(Poland) (24) Sebastian Ułamek	6	–	–	6			
24	(United Kingdom) (17) Andy Smith	4	2	1	1			
25	(Poland) (23) Piotr Protasiewicz	2	–	–	2			
26	(Czech Republic) (23) Michal Makovský	1	1	–	–			
27	(Denmark) (23) Nicki Pedersen	1	–	1	–			
28	(Czech Republic) (24) Bohumil Brhel	1	1	–	–			
Pos.	Rider	Points	CZE (Czech Republic)	SWE (Sweden)	POL (Poland)	GBR (United Kingdom)	DEN (Denmark)	EUR (Poland)

== See also ==
- Speedway Grand Prix
- List of Speedway Grand Prix riders
