= 2000 Speedway Grand Prix of Sweden =

Motoring event in Sweden

Information
- Date: 3 June 2000
- City: (Sweden) Linköping
- Event: 2 of 6 (32)
- Referee: (Germany) Wolfgang Glas

Stadium details
- Stadium: Motorstadium
- Track: speedway track

SGP Results
- Best Time
- (gold) Winner: (Australia) Jason Crump
- (silver) Runner-up: (United Kingdom) Mark Loram
- (bronze) 3rd place: (Australia) Todd Wiltshire

The 2000 Speedway Grand Prix of Sweden was the second race of the 2000 Speedway Grand Prix season. It took place on 3 June in the Motorstadium in Linköping, Sweden It was the sixth Swedish SGP and was won by Australian Jason Crump.

== Starting positions draw ==
The Speedway Grand Prix Commission nominated Nicki Pedersen and Rune Holta as Wild Card.

== Heat details ==
Placing	Draw	Rider	Total	Pre-Main Event										Main Event										Final Event
Placing	Draw	Rider	Total	Round 1						Round 2				Round 1						Round 2				1/2		CF	F
Placing	Draw	Rider	Total	1	2	3	4	5	6	7	8	9	10	11	12	13	14	15	16	17	18	19	20	21	22	23	24
1	16	(Australia) (6) Jason Crump	25	4T					1				1				1				1				1		1
2	2	(United Kingdom) (16) Mark Loram	20												1						2			2			2
3	4	(Australia) (21) Todd Wiltshire	18														3		1				1		2		3
4	6	(Sweden) (1) Tony Rickardsson	16													1				1				1			4X
5	13	(Sweden) (3) Jimmy Nilsen	15				1				1				4			2					2	3		1
6	5	(Poland) (2) Tomasz Gollob	14														2			2					4X	2
7	9	(Australia) (8) Ryan Sullivan	12	1						1				1						3		2			4	3
8	14	(Australia) (5) Leigh Adams	10			3		2					2			3		1				1		4		4
9	7	(Sweden) (12) Mikael Karlsson	8												2					4			3
10	24	(Norway) (24) Rune Holta	8	2							2			4					2			3
11	3	(United Kingdom) (10) Chris Louis	7													2					4	4
12	8	(United Kingdom) (13) Carl Stonehewer	7											2							3		4
13	1	(United States) (11) Billy Hamill	6											3				3F
14	12	(Czech Republic) (18) Antonín Kasper, Jr.	6				4	1				1				4			3
15	15	(United Kingdom) (4) Joe Screen	5		2					3		2					4	4X
16	11	(United States) (7) Greg Hancock	5			1				2					3				4
Placing	Draw	Rider	Total	1	2	3	4	5	6	7	8	9	10	11	12	13	14	15	16	17	18	19	20	21	22	23	24
17	19	(Sweden) (9) Stefan Dannö	4			2					4	3
18	10	(Sweden) (15) Henrik Gustafsson	4		1						3		3
19	21	(Denmark) (14) Brian Karger	3				2			4			4
20	18	(Poland) (22) Rafał Dobrucki	3		3				2			4
21	20	(Sweden) (19) Peter Karlsson	2				3		3
22	17	(Denmark) (20) Brian Andersen	2	3				3
23	22	(United Kingdom) (17) Andy Smith	1			4			4
24	23	(Denmark) (23) Nicki Pedersen	1		4			4

Heats 1-10: Pre-Main Event 1-4: First round 5-6: Last chance for second round 7-8: Second round 9-10: Last chance Main Event	Heats 11-20: Main Event 11-14: First round 15-16: Last chance for second round 17-18: Second round 19-20: Last chance for Semi-Finals	Heats 21-24: Final Event 21-22: Semi-Finals 23: Consolation Final 24: The Big Final

gate A – inside	gate B	gate C	gate D – outside

== Standings ==
Qualifies for next season's Grand Prix series
Full-time Grand Prix rider
Wild card, track reserve or qualified reserve

Pos.	Rider	Points	CZE (Czech Republic)	SWE (Sweden)	POL (Poland)	GBR (United Kingdom)	DEN (Denmark)	EUR (Poland)
1	(United Kingdom) (16) Mark Loram	40	20	20				
2	(Australia) (21) Todd Wiltshire	34	16	18				
3	(United States) (11) Billy Hamill	31	25	6				
4	(Sweden) (1) Tony Rickardsson	30	14	16				
5	(Australia) (6) Jason Crump	30	5	25				
6	(Poland) (2) Tomasz Gollob	29	15	14				
7	(United Kingdom) (10) Chris Louis	25	18	7				
8	(Sweden) (3) Jimmy Nilsen	21	6	15				
9	(Australia) (8) Ryan Sullivan	20	8	12				
10	(Sweden) (12) Mikael Karlsson	20	12	8				
11	(United Kingdom) (13) Carl Stonehewer	17	10	7				
12	(Australia) (5) Leigh Adams	16	6	10				
13	(Czech Republic) (18) Antonín Kasper, Jr.	13	7	6				
14	(United States) (7) Greg Hancock	12	7	5				
15	(Sweden) (15) Henrik Gustafsson	12	8	4				
16	(United Kingdom) (4) Joe Screen	10	5	5				
17	(Norway) (24) Rune Holta	8	–	8				
18	(Sweden) (9) Stefan Dannö	7	3	4				
19	(Poland) (22) Rafał Dobrucki	7	4	3				
20	(Denmark) (20) Brian Andersen	6	4	2				
21	(Denmark) (14) Brian Karger	5	2	3				
22	(Sweden) (19) Peter Karlsson	5	3	2				
23	(United Kingdom) (17) Andy Smith	3	2	1				
24	(Czech Republic) (23) Michal Makovský	1	1	–				
25	(Denmark) (23) Nicki Pedersen	1	–	1				
26	(Czech Republic) (24) Bohumil Brhel	1	1	–				
Pos.	Rider	Points	CZE (Czech Republic)	SWE (Sweden)	POL (Poland)	GBR (United Kingdom)	DEN (Denmark)	EUR (Poland)

== See also ==
- Speedway Grand Prix
- List of Speedway Grand Prix riders
