= 2000 Speedway Grand Prix of Great Britain =

(United Kingdom) 2000 Speedway Grand Prix of Great Britain

Information
- Date: 29 July 2000
- City: (United Kingdom) Coventry
- Event: 4 of 6 (34)
- Referee: (United Kingdom) Anthony Steele

Stadium details
- Stadium: Brandon Stadium
- Capacity: 5,000
- Length: 320 m (350 yd)
- Track: speedway track

SGP Results
- Best Time
- (gold) Winner: (United Kingdom) Martin Dugard
- (silver) Runner-up: (Australia) Ryan Sullivan
- (bronze) 3rd place: (United Kingdom) Mark Loram

The 2000 Speedway Grand Prix of Great Britain was the fourth race of the 2000 Speedway Grand Prix season. It took place on 29 July in the Brandon Stadium in Coventry, England

== Starting positions draw ==
The Speedway Grand Prix Commission nominated British rider Martin Dugard and Lee Richardson as Wild Card. Injured Poles Rafał Dobrucki and Tomasz Gollob was replaced by John Jørgensen and Jason Lyons.

Draw 6. (Poland) (2) Tomasz Gollob → (Australia) (28) Jason Lyons
Draw 19. (Poland) (22) Rafał Dobrucki → (Denmark) (25) John Jørgensen

== Heat details ==
Placing	Draw	Rider	Total	Pre-Main Event										Main Event										Final Event
Placing	Draw	Rider	Total	Round 1						Round 2				Round 1						Round 2				1/2		CF	F
Placing	Draw	Rider	Total	1	2	3	4	5	6	7	8	9	10	11	12	13	14	15	16	17	18	19	20	21	22	23	24
1	23	(United Kingdom) (23) Martin Dugard	25		2					1				1						3		1		1			1
2	9	(Australia) (8) Ryan Sullivan	20	2							1				1						1				1		2
3	5	(United Kingdom) (16) Mark Loram	18														1				2			2			3
4	6	(Australia) (28) Jason Lyons	16													3		2					1		2		4
5	4	(Australia) (5) Leigh Adams	15														2			1				4		1
6	1	(Sweden) (1) Tony Rickardsson	14											3				1				2			3	2
7	11	(United States) (7) Greg Hancock	12			2					2			2							3		2	3		3
8	7	(Australia) (6) Jason Crump	10												2					2					4X	4
9	3	(United Kingdom) (10) Chris Louis	8													4			2			3
10	16	(Sweden) (12) Mikael Karlsson	8	4G					1				2			1				4			3
11	10	(Sweden) (19) Peter Karlsson	7		4			2					1				3		1				4
12	12	(Australia) (21) Todd Wiltshire	7				4	1				1				2					4F	4
13	14	(Sweden) (3) Jimmy Nilsen	6			1				3		2					4	3
14	8	(Sweden) (9) Stefan Dannö	6											4					3
15	2	(United States) (11) Billy Hamill	5												4R			4F
16	20	(Sweden) (15) Henrik Gustafsson	5				2			2					3				4X
Placing	Draw	Rider	Total	1	2	3	4	5	6	7	8	9	10	11	12	13	14	15	16	17	18	19	20	21	22	23	24
17	18	(United Kingdom) (13) Carl Stonehewer	4		1						3		3
18	15	(Czech Republic) (18) Antonín Kasper, Jr.	4		3				2			3
19	13	(United Kingdom) (4) Joe Screen	3				1				4	4
20	24	(United Kingdom) (24) Lee Richardson	3	1						4			4
21	21	(United Kingdom) (17) Andy Smith	2				3		3
22	22	(Denmark) (20) Brian Andersen	2			3		3
23	17	(Denmark) (14) Brian Karger	1	3				4
24	19	(Denmark) (25) John Jørgensen	1			4			4

Heats 1-10: Pre-Main Event 1-4: First round 5-6: Last chance for second round 7-8: Second round 9-10: Last chance Main Event	Heats 11-20: Main Event 11-14: First round 15-16: Last chance for second round 17-18: Second round 19-20: Last chance for Semi-Finals	Heats 21-24: Final Event 21-22: Semi-Finals 23: Consolation Final 24: The Big Final

gate A – inside	gate B	gate C	gate D – outside

== Standings ==
Qualifies for next season's Grand Prix series
Full-time Grand Prix rider
Wild card, track reserve or qualified reserve

Pos.	Rider	Points	CZE (Czech Republic)	SWE (Sweden)	POL (Poland)	GBR (United Kingdom)	DEN (Denmark)	EUR (Poland)
1	(United Kingdom) (16) Mark Loram	73	20	20	15	18		
2	(Sweden) (1) Tony Rickardsson	69	14	16	25	14		
3	(United States) (11) Billy Hamill	56	25	6	20	5		
4	(Australia) (6) Jason Crump	52	5	25	12	10		
5	(United Kingdom) (10) Chris Louis	51	18	7	18	8		
6	(Australia) (8) Ryan Sullivan	48	8	12	8	20		
7	(Australia) (21) Todd Wiltshire	48	16	18	7	7		
8	(Australia) (5) Leigh Adams	47	6	10	16	15		
9	(Poland) (2) Tomasz Gollob	43	15	14	14	–		
10	(Sweden) (3) Jimmy Nilsen	32	6	15	5	6		
11	(Sweden) (12) Mikael Karlsson	32	12	8	4	8		
12	(United States) (7) Greg Hancock	31	7	5	7	12		
13	(United Kingdom) (23) Martin Dugard	25	–	–	–	25		
14	(United Kingdom) (13) Carl Stonehewer	24	10	7	3	4		
15	(Sweden) (9) Stefan Dannö	23	3	4	10	6		
16	(Czech Republic) (18) Antonín Kasper, Jr.	22	7	6	5	4		
17	(Sweden) (19) Peter Karlsson	20	3	2	8	7		
18	(United Kingdom) (4) Joe Screen	19	5	5	6	3		
19	(Sweden) (15) Henrik Gustafsson	19	8	4	2	5		
20	(Australia) (28) Jason Lyons	16	–	–	–	16		
21	(Denmark) (14) Brian Karger	10	2	3	4	1		
22	(Poland) (22) Rafał Dobrucki	10	4	3	3	–		
23	(Denmark) (20) Brian Andersen	9	4	2	1	2		
24	(Norway) (24) Rune Holta	8	–	8	–	–		
25	(United Kingdom) (17) Andy Smith	6	2	1	1	2		
26	(Poland) (24) Sebastian Ułamek	6	–	–	6	–		
27	(United Kingdom) (24) Lee Richardson	3	–	–	–	3		
28	(Poland) (23) Piotr Protasiewicz	2	–	–	2	–		
29	(Czech Republic) (23) Michal Makovský	1	1	–	–	–		
30	(Denmark) (23) Nicki Pedersen	1	–	1	–	–		
31	(Czech Republic) (24) Bohumil Brhel	1	1	–	–	–		
32	(Denmark) (25) John Jørgensen	1	–	–	–	1		
Pos.	Rider	Points	CZE (Czech Republic)	SWE (Sweden)	POL (Poland)	GBR (United Kingdom)	DEN (Denmark)	EUR (Poland)

== See also ==
- Speedway Grand Prix
- List of Speedway Grand Prix riders
