= 2000 Speedway Grand Prix of Czech Republic =

Information
- Date: 6 May 2000
- City: (Czech Republic) Prague
- Event: 1 of 6 (31)
- Referee: (United Kingdom) Anthony Steele

Stadium details
- Stadium: Marketa Stadium
- Track: speedway track

SGP Results
- Best Time
- (gold) Winner: (United States) Billy Hamill
- (silver) Runner-up: (United Kingdom) Mark Loram
- (bronze) 3rd place: (United Kingdom) Chris Louis

The 2000 Speedway Grand Prix of Czech Republic was the first race of the 2000 Speedway Grand Prix season. It took place on 6 May in the Marketa Stadium in Prague, Czech Republic It was the fourth Czech Republic SGP and was won by American rider Billy Hamill. This was the first Grand Prix event to use an air fence.

== Starting positions draw ==
The Speedway Grand Prix Commission nominated Michal Makovský and Bohumil Brhel as Wild Card.

== Heat details ==
Placing	Draw	Rider	Total	Pre-Main Event										Main Event										Final Event
Placing	Draw	Rider	Total	Round 1						Round 2				Round 1						Round 2				1/2		CF	F
Placing	Draw	Rider	Total	1	2	3	4	5	6	7	8	9	10	11	12	13	14	15	16	17	18	19	20	21	22	23	24
1	11	(United States) (11) Billy Hamill	25			1				2					2					1				2			1
2	16	(United Kingdom) (16) Mark Loram	20	1						3		2					1				1				2		2
3	10	(United Kingdom) (10) Chris Louis	18		3				1				2			1				4			2	1			3
4	21	(Australia) (21) Todd Wiltshire	16				1				2			2							3		1		1		4
5	2	(Poland) (2) Tomasz Gollob	15												1						4	1		3		1
6	1	(Sweden) (1) Tony Rickardsson	14											4X					2			2			3	2
7	12	(Sweden) (12) Mikael Karlsson	12				3		2			1				2					2			4		3
8	13	(United Kingdom) (13) Carl Stonehewer	10				2			1				1						2					4	4
9	8	(Australia) (8) Ryan Sullivan	8											3				2					3
10	15	(Sweden) (15) Henrik Gustafsson	8		2					4			1				2			3		3
11	7	(United States) (7) Greg Hancock	7												3				1				4
12	18	(Czech Republic) (18) Antonín Kasper, Jr.	7		1						1				4			1				4
13	3	(Sweden) (3) Jimmy Nilsen	6													3		3
14	5	(Australia) (5) Leigh Adams	6														3		3
15	4	(United Kingdom) (4) Joe Screen	5														4	4
16	6	(Australia) (6) Jason Crump	5													4			4
Placing	Draw	Rider	Total	1	2	3	4	5	6	7	8	9	10	11	12	13	14	15	16	17	18	19	20	21	22	23	24
17	20	(Denmark) (20) Brian Andersen	4				4	2					3
18	22	(Poland) (22) Rafał Dobrucki	4			3		1				3
19	9	(Sweden) (9) Stefan Dannö	3	2							4	4
20	19	(Sweden) (19) Peter Karlsson	3			2					3		4
21	14	(Denmark) (14) Brian Karger	2			4R			3
22	17	(United Kingdom) (17) Andy Smith	2	3				3
23	23	(Czech Republic) (23) Michal Makovský	1		4			4G
24	24	(Czech Republic) (24) Bohumil Brhel	1	4					4

Heats 1-10: Pre-Main Event 1-4: First round 5-6: Last chance for second round 7-8: Second round 9-10: Last chance Main Event	Heats 11-20: Main Event 11-14: First round 15-16: Last chance for second round 17-18: Second round 19-20: Last chance for Semi-Finals	Heats 21-24: Final Event 21-22: Semi-Finals 23: Consolation Final 24: The Big Final

gate A – inside	gate B	gate C	gate D – outside

== Standings ==
Qualifies for next season's Grand Prix series
Full-time Grand Prix rider
Wild card, track reserve or qualified reserve

Pos.	Rider	Points	CZE (Czech Republic)	SWE (Sweden)	POL (Poland)	GBR (United Kingdom)	DEN (Denmark)	EUR (Poland)
1	(United States) (11) Billy Hamill	25	25					
2	(United Kingdom) (16) Mark Loram	20	20					
3	(United Kingdom) (10) Chris Louis	18	18					
4	(Australia) (21) Todd Wiltshire	16	16					
5	(Poland) (2) Tomasz Gollob	15	15					
6	(Sweden) (1) Tony Rickardsson	14	14					
7	(Sweden) (12) Mikael Karlsson	12	12					
8	(United Kingdom) (13) Carl Stonehewer	10	10					
9	(Australia) (8) Ryan Sullivan	8	8					
10	(Sweden) (15) Henrik Gustafsson	8	8					
11	(United States) (7) Greg Hancock	7	7					
12	(Czech Republic) (18) Antonín Kasper, Jr.	7	7					
13	(Sweden) (3) Jimmy Nilsen	6	6					
14	(Australia) (5) Leigh Adams	6	6					
15	(United Kingdom) (4) Joe Screen	5	5					
16	(Australia) (6) Jason Crump	5	5					
17	(Denmark) (20) Brian Andersen	4	4					
18	(Poland) (22) Rafał Dobrucki	4	4					
19	(Sweden) (9) Stefan Dannö	3	3					
20	(Sweden) (19) Peter Karlsson	3	3					
21	(Denmark) (14) Brian Karger	2	2					
22	(United Kingdom) (17) Andy Smith	2	2					
23	(Czech Republic) (23) Michal Makovský	1	1					
24	(Czech Republic) (24) Bohumil Brhel	1	1					
Pos.	Rider	Points	CZE (Czech Republic)	SWE (Sweden)	POL (Poland)	GBR (United Kingdom)	DEN (Denmark)	EUR (Poland)

== See also ==
- Speedway Grand Prix
- List of Speedway Grand Prix riders
