= 2008 Bolesław Chrobry Tournament =

Seasons
- ← none 2009 →

The 1st Tournament for Bolesław Chrobry Crown - First King of Poland was the 2008 version of the Bolesław Chrobry Tournament. It took place on 29 June in the Start Gniezno Stadium in Gniezno, Poland. The Tournament was won by Rafał Dobrucki who beat Rafał Okoniewski and Sebastian Ułamek. The top Gniezno' rider Piotr Paluch was ninth.

== Heat details ==
- 29 June 2008 (Saturday)
- Best Time: 65.18 - Rafał Dobrucki in Heat 9
- Attendance: 5,000
- Referee: Józef Komakowski (Bydgoszcz)

Placing	Rider	Total	1	2	3	4	5	6	7	8	9	10	11	12	13	14	15	16	17	18	19	20	Pts	Pos	21
1	(Poland) (6) Rafał Dobrucki (ZIE)	13		3				3			3							3			1		13	2	3
2	(Poland) (8) Rafał Okoniewski (BYD)	14		2						3			3			3			3				14	1	2
3	(Poland) (5) Sebastian Ułamek (CZE)	12		1			3					3					2					3	12	3	1
4	(Poland) (13) Krzysztof Jabłoński (GDA)	12				2	2							3		2					3		12	4	0
5	(Poland) (16) Adrian Miedziński (TOR)	10				3				1	2						3			1			10	5	
6	(Poland) (9) Norbert Kościuch (POZ)	8			1		1						1					2		3			8	6	
7	(Poland) (7) Karol Ząbik (TOR)	8		0					2					2	2					2			8	7	
8	(Poland) (15) Sławomir Drabik (TAR)	7				1			3			1						0	2				7	8	
9	(Poland) (1) Piotr Paluch (GNI)	7	2				0				1				3				1				7	9	
10	(Poland) (4) Paweł Hlib (GOR)	7	1							2				1				1				2	7	10	
11	(Poland) (2) Daniel Jeleniewski (WRO)	6	3					0				2				1				0			6	11	
12	(Poland) (10) Dawid Cieślewicz (GNI)	4			3			1						E			0		0				4	12	
13	(Poland) (14) Robert Kościecha (TOR)	4				0		2					2		Fx							0	4	13	
14	(Poland) (3) Dawid Stachyra (RZE)	3	0						0				0				1				2		3	14	
15	(Poland) (12) Jacek Rempała (TAR)	3			2					0		0			1						0		3	15	
16	(Poland) (11) Mirosław Jabłoński (GNI)	2			0				1		0					0						1	2	16	
17	(Poland) (17) Łukasz Loman (GNI)	0																					0	17	
18	(Poland) (18) Sławomir Musielak (GNI)	0																					0	18	
Placing	Rider	Total	1	2	3	4	5	6	7	8	9	10	11	12	13	14	15	16	17	18	19	20	Pts	Pos	21

m - exclusion for exceeding two minute time allowance • t - exclusion for touching the tapes • x - other exclusion • e - retired or mechanical failure • f - fell • ns - non-starter • nc - non-classify

gate A - inside	gate B	gate C	gate D - outside

=== Heat after heat ===
1. (65,63) Jeleniewski, Paluch, Hlib, Stachyra
2. (66,23) Dobrucki, Okoniewski, Drabik, Ząbik
3. (66,32) Cieślewicz, Rempała, Kościuch, M. Jabłoński
4. (65,62) Miedziński, K. Jabłoński, Drabik, Kościecha
5. (65,67) Ułamek, K. Jabłoński, Kościuch, Paluch
6. (65,29) Dobrucki, Kościecha, Cieślewicz, Jeleniewski
7. (65,25) Drabik, Ząbik, M. Jabłoński, Stachyra
8. (65,71) Okoniewski, Hlib, Miedziński, Rempała
9. (65,18) Dobrucki, Miedziński, Paluch, M. Jabłoński
10. (65,33) Ułamek, Jeleniewski, Drabik, Rempała
11. (65,26) Okoniewski, Kościecha, Kościuch, Stachyra
12. (66,02) K. Jabłoński, Ząbik, Hlib, Cieślewicz (E/st)
13. (66,61) Paluch, Ząbik, Rempała, Kościecha (Fx)
14. (65,30) Okoniewski, K. Jabłoński, Jeleniewski, M. Jabłoński
15. (65,67) Miedziński, Ułamek, Stachyra, Cieślewicz
16. (65,99) Dobrucki, Kościuch, Hlib, Drabik
17. (66,00) Okoniewski, Drabik, Paluch, Cieślewicz
18. (65,93) Kościuch, Ząbik, Miedziński, Jeleniewski
19. (65,75) K. Jabłoński, Stachyra, Dobrucki, Rempała
20. (65,99) Ułamek, Hlib, M. Jabłoński, Kościecha
  The Final:
21. (66,12) Dobrucki, Okoniewski, Ułamek, K. Jabłoński

== See also ==
- motorcycle speedway
- 2008 in sports
