= 2010 Bolesław Chrobry Tournament =

Seasons
- ← 2009 2011 →

The 3rd Tournament for Bolesław Chrobry Crown - First King of Poland was the 2010 version of the Bolesław Chrobry Tournament. It took place on 29 May at the Start Gniezno Stadium in Gniezno, Poland. The Tournament was won by Pole Tomasz Gollob, who beat Rune Holta, Nicki Pedersen and Greg Hancock in the final.

== Heat details ==
- 29 May 2010 (Saturday)
- Best Time: 63.07 secs. - Tomasz Gollob in Heat 3
- Attendance: 8,500
- Referee: (Poland) Grzegorz Sokołowski (Ostrów Wielkopolski)

Placing	Rider	Total	1	2	3	4	5	6	7	8	9	10	11	12	13	14	15	16	17	18	19	20	Pts	Pos	21
1	(Poland) (12) Tomasz Gollob (GOR)	14			3					3		3			2						3		14	1	3
2	(Poland) (7) Rune Holta (CZE)	10		3					3					1	1					2			10	4	2
3	(Denmark) (5) Nicki Pedersen (GOR)	11		1			3					2					2					3	11	3	1
4	(United States) (1) Greg Hancock (ZIE)	13	3				2				2				3				3				13	2	0
5	(Sweden) (16) Andreas Jonsson (BYD)	9				3				2	0						3			1			9	5	
6	(Australia) (6) Jason Crump (WRO)	9		2				3			1							1			2		9	6	
7	(Poland) (11) Krzysztof Jabłoński (GNI)	8			0				2		3					1						2	8	7	
8	(Poland) (15) Adrian Miedziński (TOR)	8				2			0			1						3	2				8	8	
9	(Poland) (13) Piotr Protasiewicz (ZIE)	7				1	0							3		2					1		7	9	
10	(Poland) (10) Rafał Dobrucki (ZIE)	6			2			2						0			1		1				6	10	
11	(Poland) (9) Adam Skórnicki (POZ)	6			1		1						2					2		0			6	11	
12	(Russia) (2) Denis Gizatullin (BYD)	5	2					0				0				0				3			5	12	
13	(Poland) (14) Michał Szczepaniak (GNI)	5				0		1					3		0							1	5	13	
14	(Poland) (8) Adrian Gomólski (GNI)	5		0						1			1			3			Fx				5	14	
15	(United Kingdom) (4) Tai Woffinden (CZE)	2	0							0				2				0				0	2	15	
16	(Australia) (3) Jason Doyle (GNI)	2	1						1				0				F4				-		2	16	
17	(Poland) (17) Marcin Wawrzyniak (GNI)	0																			0		0	17	
	(Poland) (18) Wojciech Lisiecki (GNI)	0																					0		
Placing	Rider	Total	1	2	3	4	5	6	7	8	9	10	11	12	13	14	15	16	17	18	19	20	Pts	Pos	21

m - exclusion for exceeding two minute time allowance • t - exclusion for touching the tapes • x - other exclusion • e - retired or mechanical failure • f - fell • ns - non-starter • nc - non-classify

gate A - inside	gate B	gate C	gate D - outside

== See also ==
- motorcycle speedway
- 2010 in sports
