= Bolesław Chrobry Tournament =

The Tournament for Bolesław Chrobry Crown - First King of Poland (Polish: Turniej o Koronę Bolesława Chrobrego - Pierwszego Króla Polski) is an annual motorcycle speedway event organized by the Start Gniezno, which is a motorcycle speedway team. The tournament is held each year in the Start Gniezno Stadium in Gniezno, Poland (the first capital of Poland). The tournament is named after Bolesław I the Brave, the first King of Poland (1025), who previously ruled as Duke of Poland (992–1025).

== Podium ==
Year	Winner	Runner-up	3rd place
2008 details	(Poland) Rafał Dobrucki; Kronopol Zielona Góra	(Poland) Rafał Okoniewski; Polonia Bydgoszcz	(Poland) Sebastian Ułamek; Złomrex Włókniarz Częstochowa
2009 details	(United States) Greg Hancock; Złomrex Włókniarz Częstochowa	(Poland) Adrian Miedziński; Unibax Toruń	(Poland) Rune Holta; Caelum Stal Gorzów
2010 details	(Poland) Tomasz Gollob; Caelum Stal Gorzów	(Poland) Rune Holta; Włókniarz Częstochowa	(Denmark) Nicki Pedersen; Caelum Stal Gorzów
2011 details	(Russia) Emil Sayfutdinov; Polonia Bydgoszcz	(Poland) Tomasz Gollob; Caelum Stal Gorzów	(Sweden) Andreas Jonsson; Stelmet Falubaz Zielona Góra
2012 details	(Australia) Ryan Sullivan; Unibax Toruń	(Russia) Emil Sayfutdinov; Polonia Bydgoszcz	(Slovakia) Martin Vaculik; Azoty Tauron Tarnów
2013 details	(Denmark) Nicki Pedersen; PGE Marma Rzeszów	(Poland) Sebastian Ułamek; Lechma Start Gniezno	(Poland) Rafał Okoniewski; PGE Marma Rzeszów
2014 details	(Poland) Patryk Dudek; SPAR Falubaz Zielona Góra	(Poland) Piotr Protasiewicz; SPAR Falubaz Zielona Góra	(Poland) Bartosz Zmarzlik; Stal Gorzów
2015 details	(Poland) Rafał Okoniewski; MRGARDEN GKM Grudziądz	(Denmark) Hans Andersen; Orzeł Łódź	(Poland) Patryk Dudek; SPAR Falubaz Zielona Góra
Year	Winner	Runner-up	3rd place

== See also ==
- motorcycle speedway
- Start Gniezno
