= Stonehewer =

Stonehewer is a surname. Notable people with the surname include:

- Carl Stonehewer (born 1972), English motorcycle speedway rider
- S. Stonehewer (1813 cricketer), English cricketer
