= 1996 Speedway Under-21 World Championship =

World under 21 motorcycle speedway event

World Under-21 Championship
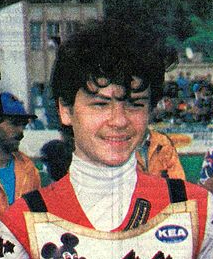
- Piotr Protasiewicz
- Venue: Olching Speedwaybahn
- Location: Olching, Germany
- Start date: 4 August 1996

The 1996 Individual Speedway Junior World Championship was the 20th edition of the World motorcycle speedway Under-21 Championships.

The final was won by Piotr Protasiewicz of Poland. The success also gained him qualification to 1997 Speedway Grand Prix.

== World final ==
- 4 August 1996
- (Germany) Olching Speedwaybahn, Olching
- Referee: Christer Bergström
- Spectators: about 3000

| Placing | Rider | Total | 1 | 2 | 3 | 4 | 5 | 6 | 7 | 8 | 9 | 10 | 11 | 12 | 13 | 14 | 15 | 16 | 17 | 18 | 19 | 20 | Pts | Pos | 21 |
|---|---|---|---|---|---|---|---|---|---|---|---|---|---|---|---|---|---|---|---|---|---|---|---|---|---|
| 1 | (Poland) (3) Piotr Protasiewicz | 15 | 3 | | | | | | 3 | | | | 3 | | | | 3 | | | | 3 | | 15 | 1 | |
| 2 | (Australia) (12) Ryan Sullivan | 11 | | | 3 | | | | | 0 | | 3 | | | 3 | | | | | | 2 | | 11 | 2 | 3 |
| 3 | (Denmark) (8) Jesper B. Jensen | 11 | | 1 | | | | | | 3 | | | 1 | | | 3 | | | 3 | | | | 11 | 3 | 2 |
| 4 | (England) (13) Scott Nicholls | 10 | | | | 3 | 3 | | | | | | | 2 | | 2 | | | | | 0 | | 10 | 4 | |
| 5 | (Poland) (6) Sebastian Ułamek | 10 | | 2 | | | | 3 | | | 3 | | | | | | | 1 | | | 1 | | 10 | 5 | |
| 6 | (Poland) (10) Rafał Dobrucki | 10 | | | 2 | | | 2 | | | | | | 3 | | | 2 | | 1 | | | | 10 | 6 | |
| 7 | (Czech Republic) (9) Michal Makovský | 8 | | | 0 | | 1 | | | | | | 2 | | | | | 2 | | 3 | | | 8 | 7 | |
| 8 | (Czech Republic) (7) George Štancl | 7 | | 3 | | | | | 1 | | | | | 0 | 2 | | | | | 1 | | | 7 | 8 | |
| 9 | (Finland) (1) Kai Laukkanen | 7 | 1 | | | | 2 | | | | 2 | | | | 0 | | | | 2 | | | | 7 | 9 | |
| 10 | (England) (16) Leigh Lanham | 7 | | | | 1 | | | | 2 | 1 | | | | | | 1 | | | 2 | | | 7 | 10 | |
| 11 | (Hungary) (11) Norbert Magosi | 6 | | | 1 | | | | 2 | | 0 | | | | | 0 | | | | | | 3 | 6 | 11 | |
| 12 | (Denmark) (14) Nicki Pedersen | 5 | | | | 2 | | 1 | | | | | 0 | | 0 | | | | | | | 2 | 5 | 12 | |
| 13 | (Germany) (2) Stefan Bachhuber | 5 | 2 | | | | | 0 | | | | 2 | | | | 1 | | | | E | | | 5 | 13 | |
| 14 | (Poland) (15) Wiesław Jaguś | 4 | | | | X | | | 0 | | | 1 | | | | | | 3 | 0 | | | | 4 | 14 | |
| 15 | (Poland) (4) Grzegorz Walasek | 3 | 0 | | | | | | | 1 | | | | 1 | | | | 0 | | | | 1 | 3 | 15 | |
| 16 | (Denmark) (5) Martin Greve | 0 | | 0 | | | 0 | | | | | 0 | | | | | 0 | | | | | 0 | 0 | 16 | |
| R1 | (Sweden) (R1) Björn Gustavsson | 0 | | | | | | | | | | | | | | | | | | | | | 0 | R1 | |
| R2 | (Poland) (R2) Damian Baliński | 0 | | | | | | | | | | | | | | | | | | | | | 0 | R2 | |
| Placing | Rider | Total | 1 | 2 | 3 | 4 | 5 | 6 | 7 | 8 | 9 | 10 | 11 | 12 | 13 | 14 | 15 | 16 | 17 | 18 | 19 | 20 | Pts | Pos | 21 |

m - exclusion for exceeding two minute time allowance • t - exclusion for touching the tapes • x - other exclusion • e - retired or mechanical failure • f - fell • ns - non-starter • nc - non-classify

| gate A - inside | gate B | gate C | gate D - outside |
