= 1995 Polish speedway season =

Motorcycle racing competition

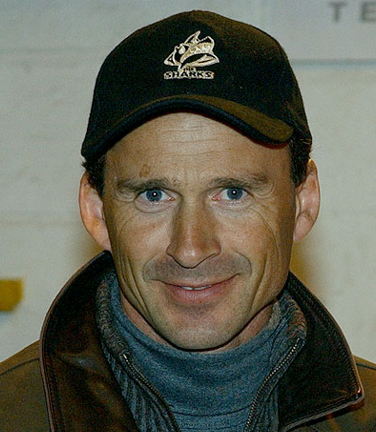
- Hans Nielsen, the 1995 World Champion topped the league averages

The 1995 Polish Speedway season was the 1995 season of motorcycle speedway in Poland.

== Individual ==
=== Polish Individual Speedway Championship ===
The 1995 Individual Speedway Polish Championship final was held on 16 July at Wrocław. Tomasz Gollob won the Polish Championship for the fourth consecutive season.

Pos.	Rider	Club	Total	Points
1	Tomasz Gollob	Bydgoszcz	14 +3	(3,3,2,3,3)
2	Piotr Świst	Gorzów Wlkp.	14 +2	(3,2,3,3,3)
3	Rafał Dobrucki	Piła	11 +3	(2,3,3,d,3)
4	Robert Sawina	Gdańsk	11 +2	(2,2,2,2,3)
5	Jacek Rempała	Tarnów	8	(1,2,1,2,2)
6	Jacek Krzyżaniak	Toruń	7	(0,0,3,3,1)
7	Grzegorz Rempała	Tarnów	7	(0,3,d,2,2)
8	Jacek Gollob	Bydgoszcz	7	(3,2,2,d,d)
9	Tomasz Fajfer	Gniezno	7	(1,3,1,w,2)
10	Marek Hućko	Gorzów Wlkp.	7	(3,1,1,1,1)
11	Tomasz Bajerski	Toruń	7	(2,d,2,1,2)
12	Jan Krzystyniak	Piła	5	(0,1,3,0,1)
13	Rafał Wilk	Rzeszów	5	(0,1,0,3,1)
14	Mirosław Kowalik	Toruń	3	(1,0,w,2,w)
15	Jarosław Olszewski	Gdańsk	3	(1,1,0,1,d)
16	Ryszard Franczyszyn	Gorzów Wlkp.	2	(2,0,0,d,–)
17	Mirosław Cierniak (res)	Tarnów	0	(w)
18	Krzysztof Kuczwalski (res)	Toruń	0	(w)

=== Golden Helmet ===
The 1995 Golden Golden Helmet (Polish: Turniej o Złoty Kask, ZK) organised by the Polish Motor Union (PZM) was the 1995 event for the league's leading riders. The final was held at Wrocław on the 25 August. Tomasz Gollob continued to dominate Polish speedway by scoring a 15-point maximum and winning his third Golden Helmet in four years, in addition to his four successive Polish titles.

Pos.	Rider	Club	Total	Points
1	Tomasz Gollob	Bydgoszcz	15	(3,3,3,3,3)
2	Jarosław Olszewski	Gdańsk	11 +3	(3,2,0,3,3)
3	Tomasz Bajerski	Toruń	11 +d	(0,3,3,2,3)
4	Roman Jankowski	Leszno	10	(2,3,2,1,2)
5	Dariusz Śledź	Wrocław	9	(3,d,3,3,d)
6	Jacek Gollob	Bydgoszcz	9	(3,2,1,3,w)
7	Mirosław Cierniak	Tarnów	9	(0,1,3,2,3)
8	Piotr Świst	Gorzów Wlkp.	8	(2,2,2,1,1)
9	Sławomir Dudek	Zielona Góra	6	(1,0,2,2,1)
10	Jacek Rempała	Tarnów	6	(2,1,2,0,1)
11	Marek Hućko	Gorzów Wlkp.	5	(1,1,1,2,0)
12	Andrzej Huszcza	Zielona Góra	5	(1,1,1,0,2)
13	Rafał Dobrucki	Piła	4	(d,3,d,0,1)
14	Piotr Markuszewski	Grudziądz	4	(1,0,0,1,2)
15	Waldemar Cieślewicz	Bydgoszcz	3	(0,w,1,0,2)
16	Marek Kępa	Lublin	2	(2,u/ns,–,–,–)
17	Jacek Krzyżaniak (res)	Toruń	3	(2,1)
18	Robert Kempiński (res)	Grudziądz	0	(0,0)

=== Junior Championship ===
- winner - Rafał Dobrucki

=== Silver Helmet ===
- winner - Rafał Dobrucki

=== Bronze Helmet ===
- winner - Rafał Dobrucki

== Pairs ==
=== Polish Pairs Speedway Championship ===
The 1995 Polish Pairs Speedway Championship was the 1995 edition of the Polish Pairs Speedway Championship. The final was held on 6 September at Częstochowa.

Pos	Team	Pts	Riders
1	Polonia Bydgoszcz	30	Tomasz Gollob 15, Jacek Gollob 15
2	Sparta Wrocław	25	Dariusz Śledź 11, Piotr Protasiewicz 13, Piotr Baron 1
3	Apator Toruń	17+3	Jacek Krzyżaniak 11, Tomasz Bajerski 4+3, Mirosław Kowalik 2
4	Unia Tarnów	17+2	Jacek Rempała 6, Mirosław Cierniak 11+2
5	Polonia Piła	16	Rafał Dobrucki 12, Waldemar Walczak 4, Jan Krzystyniak 0
6	Włókniarz Częstochowa	15	Sebastian Ułamek 11, Rafał Osumek 2, Janusz Stachyra 2
7	Stal Gorzów Wlkp.	6	Robert Flis 4, Mariusz Staszewski 2, Sylwester Moskwiak 0

== Team ==
=== Team Speedway Polish Championship ===
The 1995 Team Speedway Polish Championship was the 1995 edition of the Team Polish Championship. WTS Wrocław won the gold medal for the third consecutive season. The team was once again led by the Dane Tommy Knudsen and he was strongly supported by Piotr Protasiewicz, Dariusz Śledź and Piotr Baron. Hans Nielsen topped the Polish averages with 2.772 for Polonia Piła.

==== First Division ====
Pos	Team	Pts	W	D	L	Diff
1	WTS Sparta Wrocław	28	14	0	4	+191
2	Apator Toruń	26	13	0	5	+149
3	Polonia Bydgoszcz	24	12	0	6	+210
4	Polonia Piła	23	11	1	6	+59
5	Unia Tarnów	22	11	0	7	+127
6	Stal Gorzów Wielkopolski	18	9	0	9	+71
7	Stal Rzeszów	14	7	0	11	–83
8	Włókniarz Częstochowa	14	7	0	11	–167
9	Wybrzeże Gdańsk	8	4	0	14	–135
10	Motor Lublin	3	1	1	16	–422

==== Second Division ====
Pos	Team	Pts	W	D	L	Diff
1	Start Gniezno	30	15	0	3	+256
2	GKM Grudziądz	30	15	0	3	+241
3	Unia Leszno	29	14	1	3	+351
4	ZKŻ Zielona Góra	28	13	2	3	+27
5	RKM Rybnik	14	6	2	10	–60
6	Wanda Kraków	14	7	0	11	–114
7	Łódź	11	5	1	12	–64
8	KKŻ Krosno	10	5	0	13	–316
9	Śląsk Świętochłowice	8	4	0	14	–236
10	Kolejarz Opole	6	3	0	15	–329
