= 2000 Speedway Grand Prix =

6th season of the Speedway Grand Prix

Season details
- Dates: May 6 – September 23
- Events: 6
- Cities: 6
- Countries: 5
- Riders: 22 permanents 2 wild card(s)
- Heats: 144 (in 6 events)

Winners
- Champion: GBR Mark Loram
- Runner-up: USA Billy Hamill
- 3rd place: SWE Tony Rickardsson

The 2000 Speedway Grand Prix was the 55th edition of the official World Championship to determine the world champion rider. It was the sixth season in the Speedway Grand Prix era and was used to determine the Speedway World Champion.

== Event format ==
The system first used in 1998 continued to be adopted with 24 riders, divided into two classes. The eight best would be directly qualified for the "Main Event", while the sixteen others would be knocked out if they finished out of the top two in 4-man heats on two occasions – while they would go through if they finished inside the top two on two occasions. This resulted in 10 heats, where eight proceeded to the Main Event, where exactly the same system was applied to give eight riders to a semi-final.

The semi-finals were then two heats of four, where the top two qualified for a final and the last two going towards the consolation final. The 4 finalists scored 25, 20, 18 and 16 points, with 5th to 8th scoring 15, 14, 12 and 10-point, and after that 8, 8, 7, 7, etc. Places after 8th place were awarded according to the time a rider was knocked out and, secondly, according to position in the last heat he rode in.

== Qualification ==
The 2000 season had 22 permanent riders and two wild cards at each event. The permanent riders are highlighted in the results table below.

== Calendar ==
Round	Date	City and venue	Winner	Runner-up	3rd placed	4th placed	Results
1	May 6	(Czech Republic) Prague , Czech Republic; Markéta Stadium	(United States) Billy Hamill	(United Kingdom) Mark Loram	(United Kingdom) Chris Louis	(Australia) Todd Wiltshire	results
2	June 3	(Sweden) Linköping , Sweden; Motorstadium	(Australia) Jason Crump	(United Kingdom) Mark Loram	(Australia) Todd Wiltshire	(Sweden) Tony Rickardsson	results
3	July 1	(Poland) Wrocław , Poland; Olympic Stadium	(Sweden) Tony Rickardsson	(United States) Billy Hamill	(United Kingdom) Chris Louis	(Australia) Leigh Adams	results
4	July 29	(United Kingdom) Coventry , Great Britain; Brandon Stadium	(United Kingdom) Martin Dugard	(Australia) Ryan Sullivan	(United Kingdom) Mark Loram	(Australia) Jason Lyons	results
5	September 2	(Denmark) Vojens , Denmark; Speedway Center	(United States) Greg Hancock	(Australia) Jason Crump	(Sweden) Stefan Dannö	(Denmark) Nicki Pedersen	results
6	September 23	Bydgoszcz , Poland; Polonia Stadium	(United States) Billy Hamill	(United States) Greg Hancock	(Sweden) Tony Rickardsson	(Australia) Jason Crump	results

== Final standings ==
Qualifies for next season's Grand Prix series
Full-time Grand Prix rider
Wild card, track reserve or qualified reserve

Pos.	Rider	Points	CZE (Czech Republic)	SWE (Sweden)	POL (Poland)	GBR (United Kingdom)	DEN (Denmark)	EUR (Poland)
Gold	(United Kingdom) (16) Mark Loram	102	20	20	15	18	15	14
Silver	(United States) (11) Billy Hamill	95	25	6	20	5	14	25
Bronze	(Sweden) (1) Tony Rickardsson	94	14	16	25	14	7	18
4	(Australia) (6) Jason Crump	88	5	25	12	10	20	16
5	(United States) (7) Greg Hancock	76	7	5	7	12	25	20
6	(Australia) (5) Leigh Adams	65	6	10	16	15	12	6
7	(Poland) (2) Tomasz Gollob	64	15	14	14	–	6	15
8	(Australia) (21) Todd Wiltshire	63	16	18	7	7	3	12
9	(Australia) (8) Ryan Sullivan	62	8	12	8	20	8	6
10	(United Kingdom) (10) Chris Louis	60	18	7	18	8	5	4
11	(Sweden) (3) Jimmy Nilsen	42	6	15	5	6	2	8
12	(Sweden) (9) Stefan Dannö	41	3	4	10	6	18	0
13	(Sweden) (12) Mikael Karlsson	39	12	8	4	8	5	2
14	(Sweden) (15) Henrik Gustafsson	39	8	4	2	5	10	10
15	(Sweden) (19) Peter Karlsson	35	3	2	8	7	8	7
16	(United Kingdom) (4) Joe Screen	34	5	5	6	3	7	8
17	(Czech Republic) (18) Antonín Kasper, Jr.	32	7	6	5	4	6	4
18	(United Kingdom) (13) Carl Stonehewer	30	10	7	3	4	3	3
19	(United Kingdom) (23) Martin Dugard	25	–	–	–	25	–	–
20	(Denmark) (23) Nicki Pedersen	17	–	1	–	–	16	–
21	(Poland) (22) Rafał Dobrucki	16	4	3	3	–	1	5
22	(Australia) (28) Jason Lyons	16	–	–	–	16	–	–
23	(Denmark) (20) Brian Andersen	15	4	2	1	2	4	2
24	(Denmark) (14) Brian Karger	13	2	3	4	1	2	1
25	(United Kingdom) (17) Andy Smith	10	2	1	1	2	1	3
26	(Norway) (24) Rune Holta	8	–	8	–	–	–	–
27	(Poland) (24) Jarosław Hampel	7	–	–	–	–	–	7
28	(Poland) (24) Sebastian Ułamek	6	–	–	6	–	–	–
29	(Denmark) (24) Jesper B. Jensen	4	–	–	–	–	4	–
30	(Poland) (23) Piotr Protasiewicz	3	–	–	2	–	–	1
31	(United Kingdom) (24) Lee Richardson	3	–	–	–	3	–	–
32	(Czech Republic) (23) Michal Makovský	1	1	–	–	–	–	–
33	(Czech Republic) (24) Bohumil Brhel	1	1	–	–	–	–	–
34	(Denmark) (25) John Jørgensen	1	–	–	–	1	–	–
Pos.	Rider	Points	CZE (Czech Republic)	SWE (Sweden)	POL (Poland)	GBR (United Kingdom)	DEN (Denmark)	EUR (Poland)
