= 1991 Australian Under-16 Individual Speedway Championship =

Seasons
- ← 1990 1992 →

The 1991 Australian Under-16 Individual Speedway Championship was the tenth running of the Australian Under-16 Speedway Championship organised by Motorcycling Australia for bikes with 125cc engines. The final took place on 12 January 1991 at the 112 metres (122 yards) Sidewinders Speedway in Adelaide, South Australia.

Local Adelaide based riders dominated the meeting filling eight of the top ten places. 1990 Australian Championship runner-up Ryan Sullivan took out his first Australian Championship with an unbeaten 15 point maximum to lead home Ashley Watson and Brett Woodifield who won a four-way runoff for third place over Troy Wyten, Ford Keane and Victorian Jason Stewart. Sullivan turned 16 a week after the championship and graduated into the senior ranks.

== 1991 Australian Under-16 Solo Championship ==
- 12 January
- Adelaide, South Australia - Sidewinders Speedway
- Referee: (Australia) Sam Bass

| Pos. | Rider | Points | Details |
|---|---|---|---|
| Gold | Ryan Sullivan ( (South Australia) ) | 15 | (3,3,3,3,3) |
| Silver | Ashley Watson ( (South Australia) ) | 12 | (3,2,2,3,2) |
| Bronze | Brett Woodifield ( (South Australia) ) | 11+3 | (2,3,3,x,3 +3) |
| 4 | Troy Wyten ( (South Australia) ) | 11+2 | (3,2,3,3,x +2) |
| 5 | Ford Keane ( (South Australia) ) | 11+1 | (2,3,2,2,2 +1) |
| 6 | Jason Stewart ( (Victoria (state)) ) | 11+0 | (2,1,3,2,3 +0) |
| 7 | Nathan Hawkes ( (Victoria (state)) ) | 9 | (3,1,1,2,2) |
| 8 | Andrew Nicol ( (South Australia) ) | 7 | (1,2,r,1,3) |
| 9 | Fred Hunton ( (South Australia) ) | 6 | (2,3,0,f,1) |
| 10 | Sean Curtis ( (South Australia) ) | 4 | (0,2,2,0,f) |
| 11 | Adam Squires ( (Victoria (state)) ) | 4 | (1,x,1,x,2) |
| 12 | Grant Schooling ( (South Australia) ) (Res) | 4 | (1,3,-,-,-) |
| 13 | Chris Ferguson ( (Victoria (state)) ) | 3 | (0,1,1,x,1) |
| 14 | David East ( (Northern Territory) ) | 2 | (0,r,2,x,0) |
| 15 | Todd Johnson ( (Western Australia) ) | 2 | (0,1,x,r,1) |
| 16 | Clinton Leitch ( (Queensland) ) | 2 | (1,f,ns,0,1) |
| 17 | Aaron Griffiths ( (Western Australia) ) | 1 | (ns,0,1,ns,0) |
| 18 | Jarrod South ( (South Australia) ) (Res) | 1 | (1,x,-,-,-) |

== See also ==
- Motorcycle speedway
- Sport in Australia
