= 1997 Speedway Under-21 World Championship =

European motorcycle speedway event

World Under-21 Championship
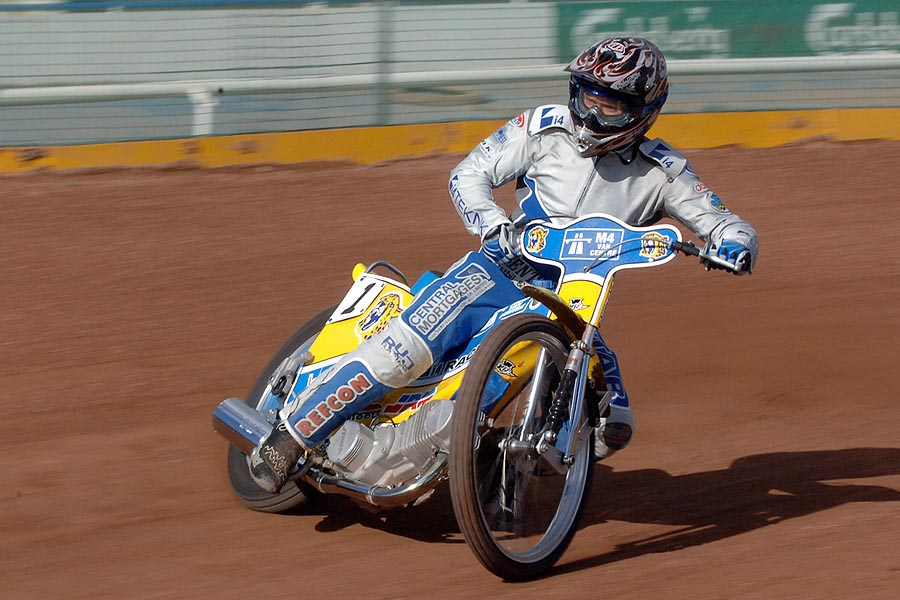
- Jesper B. Jensen in action
- Venue: Mšeno Speedway Stadium
- Location: Mšeno, Czech Republic
- Start date: 2 August 1997

The 1997 Individual Speedway Junior World Championship was the 21st edition of the World motorcycle speedway Under-21 Championships.

The final was won by Jesper B. Jensen of Denmark and he also gained qualification to 1998 Speedway Grand Prix.

== World final ==
- 2 August 1997
- (Czech Republic) Mšeno Speedway Stadium, Mšeno

Placing	Rider	Total	1	2	3	4	5	6	7	8	9	10	11	12	13	14	15	16	17	18	19	20	Pts	Pos	21
1	(Denmark) (1) Jesper B. Jensen	14	3				2				3				3				3				14	1	
2	(Poland) (13) Rafał Dobrucki	11				3	3							E		2					3		11	2	3
3	(England) (15) Scott Nicholls	11				1			3			2						3	2				11	3	2
4	(Russia) (9) Roman Povazhny	10			3		1						2					2		2			10	4	
5	(Denmark) (5) Charlie Gjedde	9		0			0					3					3					3	9	5	
6	(Poland) (16) Rafał Kowalski	9				E				3	1						2			3			9	6	
7	(Sweden) (8) Andreas Jonsson	8		3						1			3			T			1				8	7	
8	(Czech Republic) (2) Michal Makovský	8	1					2				1				3				1			8	8	
9	(Czech Republic) (12) Marián Jirout	8			2					2		0			2						2		8	9	
10	(Poland) (14) Grzegorz Walasek	7				2		3					F/-		1							1	7	10	
11	(Denmark) (3) Nicki Pedersen	6	2						2				1				1				X		6	11	
12	(Poland) (10) Tomasz Cieślewicz	5			1			1						3			E		0				5	12	
13	(Poland) (6) Paweł Staszek	5		1				0			2							1			1		5	13	
14	(Sweden) (11) Emil Lindqvist	4			0				1		0					1						2	4	14	
15	(Poland) (4) Paweł Łęcki	2	F							X				2				0				0	2	15	
16	(Germany) (7) Stefan Bachhuber	2		2					0					E	0					0			2	16	
R1	(Denmark) (R1) Kristian Andersen	1											1										1	R1	
R2	(Poland) (R2) Bartłomiej Bardecki	0														X							0	R2	
Placing	Rider	Total	1	2	3	4	5	6	7	8	9	10	11	12	13	14	15	16	17	18	19	20	Pts	Pos	21

m - exclusion for exceeding two minute time allowance • t - exclusion for touching the tapes • x - other exclusion • e - retired or mechanical failure • f - fell • ns - non-starter • nc - non-classify

gate A - inside	gate B	gate C	gate D - outside
