= 2009 Bolesław Chrobry Tournament =

The 2nd Tournament for Bolesław Chrobry Crown - First King of Poland was the 2009 version of the Bolesław Chrobry Tournament. It took place on 23 May in the Start Gniezno Stadium in Gniezno, Poland. The draw was made on 15 May in the Gniezno' Old Square. The Tournament was won by Greg Hancock who beat Adrian Miedziński and Rune Holta. The top Gniezno' rider Krzysztof Słaboń was eighth.

== Heat details ==
- 23 May 2009 (Saturday)
- Best Time:
- Attendance: 8,500
- Referee:
- Change: (7) Grzegorz Walasek (ZIE) → Rune Holta (GOR)

Placing	Rider	Total	1	2	3	4	5	6	7	8	9	10	11	12	13	14	15	16	17	18	19	20	Pts	Pos	21
1	(United States) (3) Greg Hancock (CZE)	12	0						3				3				3				3		12	1	3
2	(Poland) (9) Adrian Miedziński (TOR)	11			2		3						T/-					3		3			11	4	2
3	(Poland) (7) Rune Holta (GOR)	12		3					1					3	3					2			12	2	1
4	(Poland) (4) Sebastian Ułamek (TAR)	12	3							3				2				1				3	12	3	0
5	(Poland) (11) Adrian Gomólski (OST)	9			3				0		1					3						2	9	5	
6	(Poland) (1) Rafał Dobrucki (ZIE)	8	1				1				3				1				2				8	6	
7	(Poland) (16) Adam Skórnicki (GDA)	8				2				1	2						2			1			8	7	
8	(Poland) (6) Krzysztof Słaboń (GNI)	7		2				3			0							2			0		7	8	
9	(Poland) (10) Damian Baliński (LES)	6			1			2						X			0		3				6	9	
10	(Russia) (15) Emil Sayfutdinov (BYD)	6				1			2			3						-	-				6	10	
11	(Poland) (14) Krzysztof Jabłoński (GNI)	6				3		1					1		0							1	6	11	
12	(Sweden) (13) Peter Ljung (GNI)	6				0	2							1		2					1		6	12	
13	(Poland) (8) Wiesław Jaguś (TOR)	5		0						2			2			0			1				5	13	
14	(Poland) (12) Tomasz Jędrzejak (WRO)	5			0					0		1			2						2		5	14	
15	(Poland) (5) Tomasz Gollob (GOR)	4		1			0					2					1					E2	4	15	
16	(Poland) (2) Rafał Okoniewski (GOR)	3	2					0				0				1				0			3	16	
	(Poland) (17) Kacper Gomólski (GNI)	0											0					0	0				0		
Placing	Rider	Total	1	2	3	4	5	6	7	8	9	10	11	12	13	14	15	16	17	18	19	20	Pts	Pos	21

m - exclusion for exceeding two minute time allowance • t - exclusion for touching the tapes • x - other exclusion • e - retired or mechanical failure • f - fell • ns - non-starter • nc - non-classify

gate A - inside	gate B	gate C	gate D - outside

=== Heat after heat ===
1. Ułamek, Okoniewski, Dobrucki, Hancock
2. Holta, Słaboń, Gollob, Jaguś
3. A.Gomólski, Miedziński, Baliński, Jędrzejak
4. Jabłoński, Skórnicki, Saifutdinov, Ljung
5. Miedziński, Ljung, Dobrucki, Gollob
6. Słaboń, Baliński, Jabłoński, Okoniewski
7. Hancock, Saifutdinov, Holta, A.Gomólski
8. Ułamek, Jaguś, Skórnicki, Jędrzejak
9. Dobrucki, Skórnicki, A.Gomólski, Słaboń
10. Saifutdinov, Gollob, Jędrzejak, Okoniewski
11. Hancock, Jaguś, Jabłoński, K.Gomólski, Miedziński (t/-)
12. Holta, Ułamek, Ljung, Baliński (X)
13. Holta, Jędrzejak, Dobrucki, Jabłoński
14. A.Gomólski, Ljung, Okoniewski, Jaguś
15. Hancock, Skórnicki, Gollob, Baliński
16. Miedziński, Słaboń, Ułamek, K.Gomólski
17. Baliński, Dobrucki, Jaguś, K.Gomólski
18. Miedziński, Holta, Skórnicki, Okoniewski
19. Hancock, Jędrzejak, Ljung, Słaboń
20. Ułamek, A.Gomólski, Jabłoński, Gollob (e2)
  The Final:
21. Hancock, Miedziński, Holta, Ułamek

== See also ==
- motorcycle speedway
- 2009 in sports
