= Olching Speedwaybahn =

Speedway stadium in Olching, Germany

- Location: Toni-März-Straße, 82140 Olching, Germany
- Coordinates: 48°12′26″N 11°19′25″E
- Capacity: 9,712
- Length: 0.390 km

The Olching Speedwaybahn is a 9,712-capacity motorcycle speedway stadium in the western part of Olching in Germany. The venue is used by the speedway team MSC Olching, who compete in the German Bundesliga. The venue is also used by ADAC members and has also been used for concerts.

== History ==
The stadium has hosted several of the sport's premier events including the finals of the 1972 Speedway World Team Cup and the 1981 Speedway World Team Cup. In 1996, it hosted the 1996 Speedway Under-21 World Championship.

On 14 September 2014, the 390-metre track record was broken by Martin Smolinski who recorded 64.5 sec in Olching Speedwaybahn. It is a record which remains unbroken as of 2024.

In 2015, a new surface replaced the previous one. In 2017, the stadium was selected as the venue for the semi final of the 2018 Speedway Grand Prix Qualification.
