= Jesper B. Monberg =

Danish speedway rider (born 1977)

Jesper B. Monberg Jesper B. Jensen
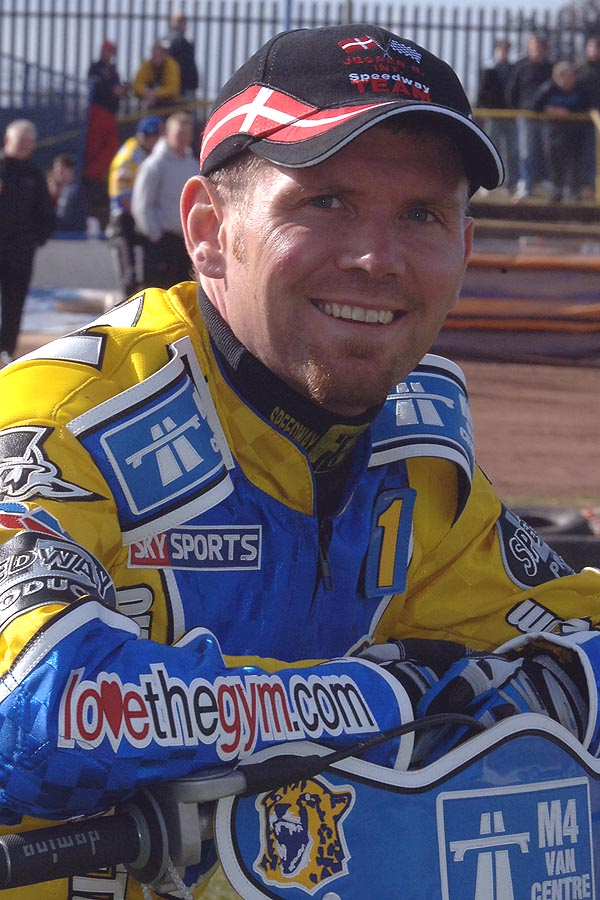
- Jesper Jensen in 2007
- Born: 14 October 1977 (age 49); Esbjerg, Denmark
- Nationality: Danish

Career history

Denmark
- 2000–2003, 2012: Holsted
- 2004–2006, 2008–2011, 2013, 2017: Slangerup
- 2014: Fjelsted
- 2007, 2015: Esbjerg

Great Britain
- 1997–2003, 2008: Wolverhampton Wolves
- 2004, 2007: Ipswich Witches
- 2005–2006, 2012: Peterborough Panthers
- 2005, 2007: Oxford Cheetahs
- 2011: Swindon Robins
- 2012: Somerset Rebels

Poland
- 1999–2000, 2014–2015: Piła
- 2001: Grudziądz
- 2002, 2007–2008: Gorzów
- 2003, 2006, 2011: Gniezno
- 2005: Lublin
- 2009–2010: Tarnów
- 2011: Rybnik
- 2012: Wrocław
- 2013: Opole

Sweden
- 1997–1999: Vetlanda
- 2000: Örnarna
- 2001–2002: Vargarna
- 2003–2005: Smederna
- 2007–2008: Hammarby
- 2008–2009: Indianerna
- 2011: Piraterna

Individual honours
- 2005: European Champion
- 1997: Under-21 World Champion

Team honours
- 1997: Team World Champion
- 2006: British Elite League winner

Jesper Bruun Monberg (born Jesper Bruun Jensen 14 October 1977) is a former speedway rider from Denmark.

== Career ==
Jensen came to prominence in 1997 when he won the 1997 Speedway Under-21 World Championship. This was the same year that he joined Wolverhampton Wolves. He was also a team member of the Danish side that won the 1997 Team World Championship.

Jensen rode for Wolves for seven seasons, until he joined Ipswich Witches in 2004. In 2005, he joined Peterborough Panthers and Oxford Cheetahs and won the 2005 Individual European Championship. During the 2006 Elite League speedway season, Jensen was instrumental in helping Peterborough win the Elite League title. He averaged 8.76 as the team topped the regular season table and then won the play offs.

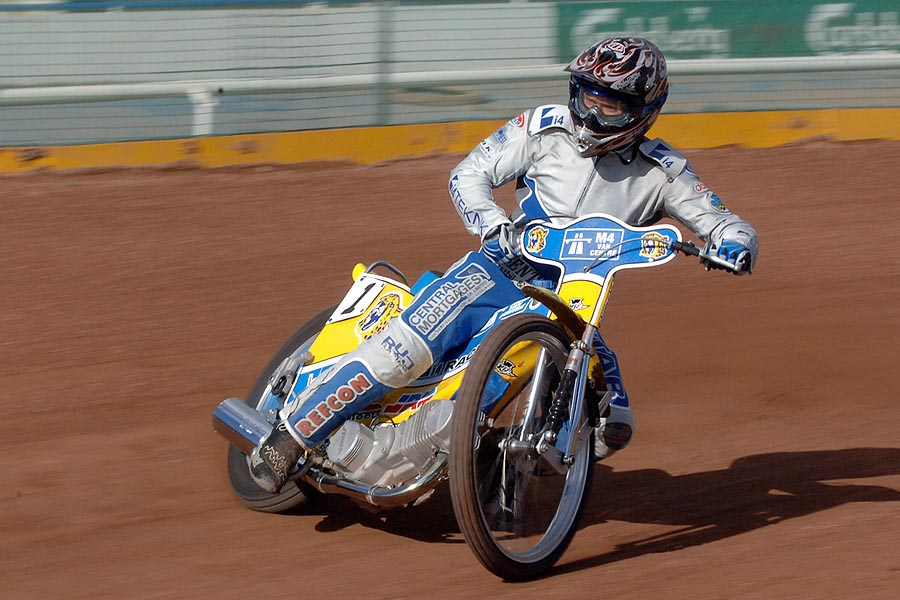
Jensen riding for Oxford in 2007

Previously known as Jesper B. Jensen, in March 2008, he changed his last name to that of his wife Rikke Monberg.

He continued to ride for various clubs in Britain and Poland until he retired after the 2015 season.

== Career summary ==
- Individual World Championship (Speedway Grand Prix)
  - 1997 – 21st place (4 points)
  - 1998 – 22nd place (14 points)
  - 1999 – 28th place (3 points)
  - 2000 – 29th place (4 points)
  - 2001 – 34th place (3 points)
  - 2003 – 43rd place (1 point)
  - 2004 – 18th place (37 points)
  - 2007 – 35th place (0 points)
- Individual U-21 World Championship
  - 1996 – 3rd place (11 points +2)
  - 1997 – World Champion (14 points)
- Team World Championship (Speedway World Cup)
  - 1996 – 3rd place (4 points)
  - 1997 – World Champion (reserve)
  - 1999 – 2nd place (14 points) in Semi-Final A
- 2000 – 2nd place (6 points) in Semi-Final B
  - 2001 – 4th place (5 points)
  - 2004 – 2ns place (reserve)
- Individual European Championship
  - 2005 – 4th place (11 points +2)
  - 2005 – European Champion (14 points +3)
- Individual Danish Championship
  - 2001 – 3rd place
  - 2003 – 3rd place
- Individual Junior Danish Championship
  - 1994 – 2nd place

== See also ==
- List of Speedway Grand Prix riders
- Denmark national speedway team
