= Mark Loram =

British motorcycle speedway rider

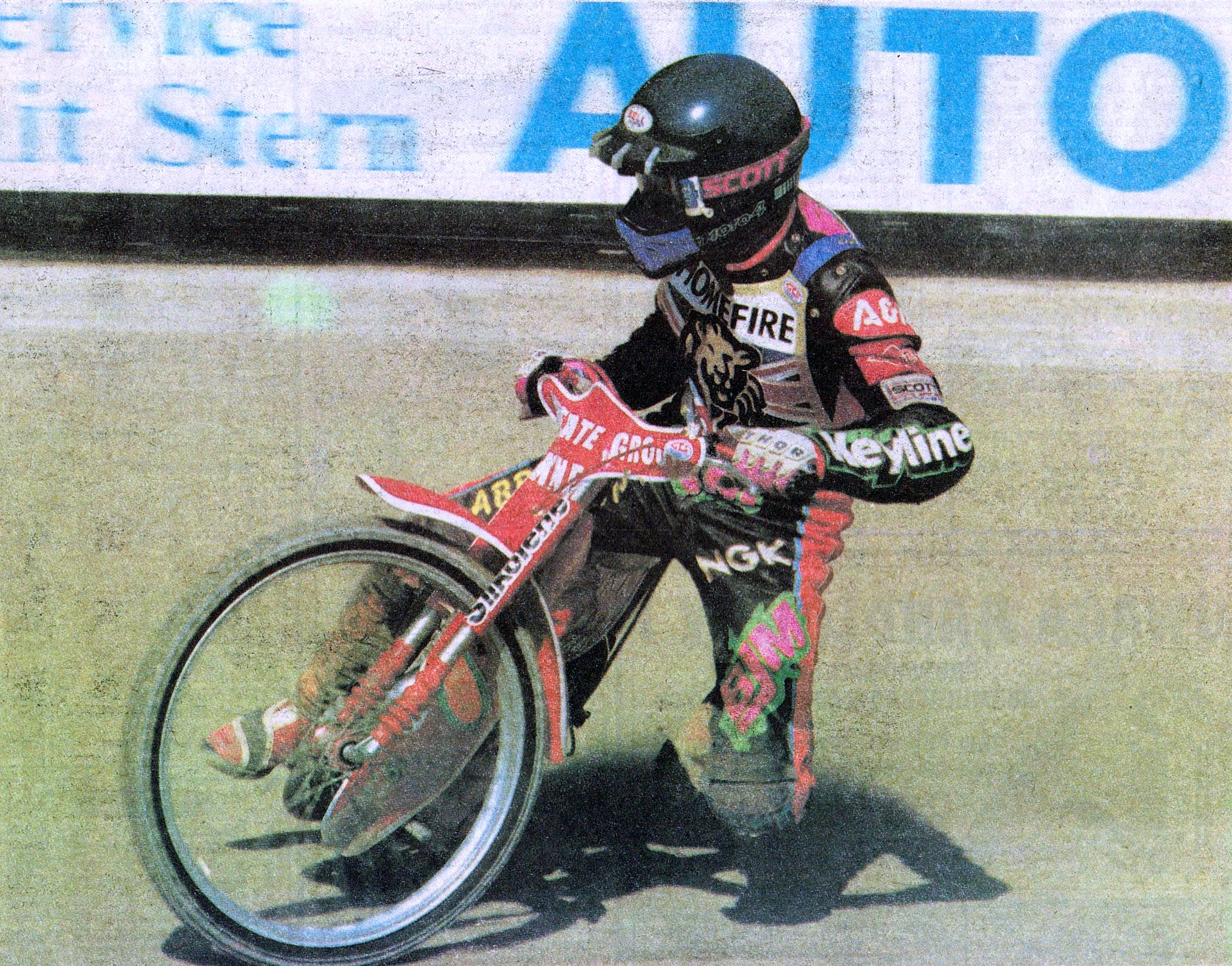
- Born: 12 January 1971 (age 55); Mtarfa, Malta
- Nationality: British

Career history

Great Britain
- 1987–1988: Hackney Kestrels
- 1989, 2006–2009: Ipswich Witches
- 1990–1994: King's Lynn Stars
- 1995–1996: Exeter Falcons
- 1997: Bradford Dukes
- 1998: Wolverhampton Wolves
- 1999–2000: Poole Pirates
- 2001: Peterborough Panthers
- 2002–2003: Eastbourne Eagles
- 2004–2005: Arena Essex Hammers

Poland
- 1992, 1999–2000: Częstochowa
- 1993–1997: Toruń
- 1998, 2007: Ostrów
- 2001–2003: Bydgoszcz
- 2004: Rybnik
- 2005: Gorzów
- 2006: Leszno

Sweden
- 1992–1997: Bysarna
- 1999–2000: Smederna
- 2001–2004: Team Svelux/Luxo Stars
- 2005–2006: Piraterna

Individual honours
- 2000: World Champion
- 1997: Danish Grand Prix Winner
- 1999: Swedish Grand Prix Winner
- 1994: Commonwealth Champion
- 1999: Overseas Champion
- 1997, 1999, 2001: British Champion
- 1989: National League Riders Champ

Team honours
- 1988: National League
- 1997: Elite League
- 1988, 2001, 2002, 2003: Knockout Cup winner

Mark Roysten Gregory Loram (born 12 January 1971) is a British former motorcycle speedway rider, who won the World Speedway Championship in 2000 and won the British Championship in 1997, 1999, and 2001. He earned 36 international caps for the England national speedway team and 10 caps for the Great Britain team.

== Career ==
=== 1987 to 1993 ===
Born in Mtarfa, Malta, Loram started his career with the Hackney Kestrels during the 1987 British League season. He averaged a respectable 5.08 and retained his place in the Hackney side for the 1988 National League season, where he not only topped the league averages but also led hackney to the league and cup double. he also became the British junior champion.

Loram signed for Ipswich Witches for the 1989 National League season and won his first individual honours by winning the Riders' Championship. He also reached the final of the Under 21 World Championship. The following season he stepped up to the highest league after joining King's Lynn Stars for the 1990 British League season. Despite the team finishing last he topped the club averages for the season, reached his British Speedway Championship and competed in the 1990 Individual Long Track World Championship.

For the next three seasons (1991, 1992 and 1993), Loram rode for King's Lynn as a heat leader and reached a second World U21 final in 1992, losing to Leigh Adams in a run-off for the title.

=== 1994 to 1999 ===
By 1994, Loram was competing with the world's best riders and reached the final of the 1994 Individual Speedway World Championship, where he finished in 8th place. The following season in 1995 he moved to Exeter Falcons from King's Lynn and took part in the 1995 Speedway Grand Prix (the new version of the World Championship).

In 1997, Loram became British champion, won the Danish Grand Prix in Vojens and won the league title with Bradford Dukes. After a season with Wolverhampton Wolves in 1998, he joined Poole Pirates. In 1999, Loram became the first rider in Speedway Grand Prix history to win a GP whilst being entered as a wild card and won the Swedish Grand Prix in Linköping. He also became British champion for the second time.

=== 2000 to 2009 ===
Loram became the Speedway World Champion in 2000 despite not winning any of the Grand Prix meetings held that year, the only rider to ever do so. However, he was the only rider to reach the semi-finals in all six meetings which along with runner-up placings in the opening two rounds in the Czech Republic and Sweden as well as a third in Britain in Round 4 gave him enough points to secure his first and only world title. Loram scored 102 points over the six rounds to defeat 1996 champion Billy Hamill on 95 and defending champion Tony Rickardsson on 94. Loram's win saw him become the seventh British rider to win speedway's ultimate individual prize. He would remain a Grand Prix rider until the end of the 2004 season.

Loram won a third British Speedway Championship in 2001 and won the Knockout Cup with Peterborough Panthers during the 2001 Elite League speedway season. He won another Knockout Cup with Eastbourne Eagles the following year. After two seasons with Eastbourne, he joined the Arena Essex Hammers for 2004 and 2005 seasons.

In March 2007, Loram broke his thigh and dislocated his arm whilst riding in the opening fixture of the Elite League season for the Ipswich Witches. This ended his involvement in the sport for 2007, and he was unable to ride in 2008 and 2009. On 17 December 2009, Loram officially announced his retirement from speedway.

== World Final Appearances ==
- 1994 - (Denmark) Vojens, Speedway Center - 8th - 9pts

== Speedway Grand Prix results ==
Year	Position	Points	Best Finish	Notes
1995	6th	77	3rd	Third in British Grand Prix
1996	7th	58	2nd	Second in Danish Grand Prix
1997	5th	81	Winner	Won Danish Grand Prix
1998	10th	52	6th	
1999	5th	71	Winner	Won Swedish Grand Prix
2000	1st	102	2nd	Only rider to make every semi-final
2001	9th	54	4th	
2002	8th	97	3rd	Third in Polish and Slovenian Grand Prix
2003	18th	32	11th	
2004	17th	38	9th	

== World Longtrack Championship ==
Finals

- 1990 - GER Herxheim 15pts (10th)
- 1991 - CZE Marianske Lazne 8pts (10th)
- 1992 - GER Pfarrkirchen 18pts (5th)
- 1993 - GER Muhldorf 5pts (14th)
- 1994 - CZE Marianske Lazne 9pts (10th)

== British Grasstrack Championship ==
First

1991 & 1993
