= Rafał Dobrucki =

Polish speedway rider

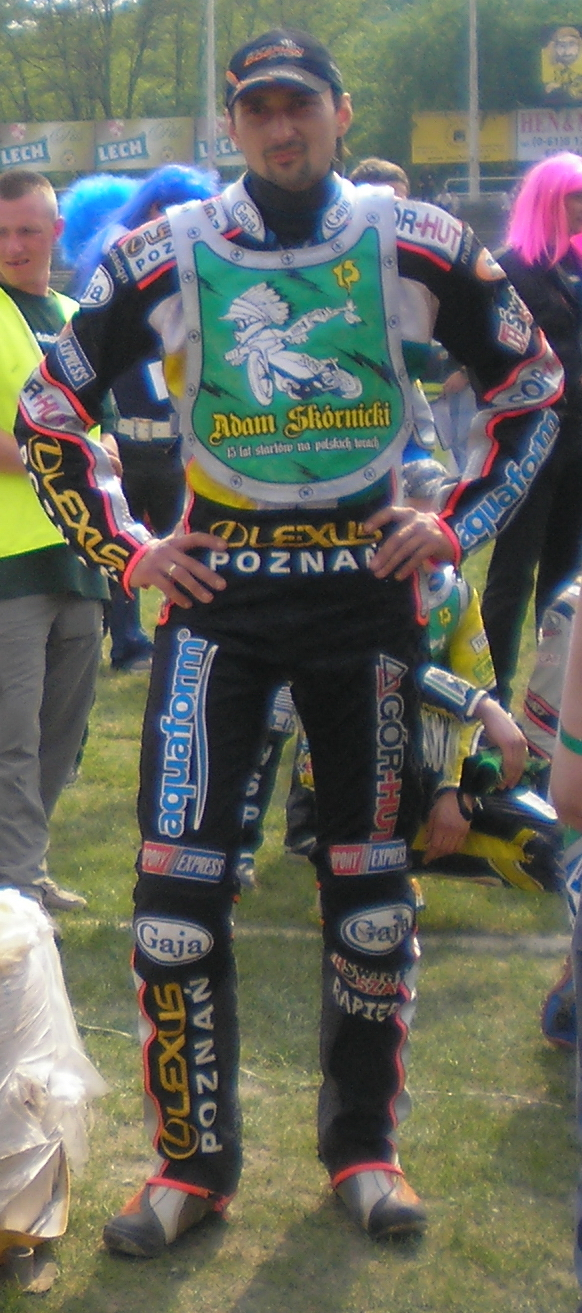
- Born: 27 December 1977 (age 48); Leszno, Poland
- Nationality: Polish

Career history

Poland
- 1993–2002: Piła
- 2003–2006: Leszno
- 2007: Rzeszów
- 2008–2011: Zielona Góra

Great Britain
- 2004: Oxford Silver Machine

Sweden
- 1999: Karlstad
- 2000–2004, 2007: Kaparna
- 2008: Hammarby
- 2009–2010: Piraterna

Denmark
- 2009–2010: Brovst

Individual honours
- 1999: Continental Champion
- 1995: U-21 Polish Champion

Team honours
- 2000, 2009: European Clubs Champion
- 2003: Swedish Elitserien Champion

Rafał Dobrucki ['rafaw dɔˈbrut͡ski] (born 27 December 1976 Poland) is a Polish former speedway rider. He earned four international caps for the Poland speedway team.

== Career ==
On 25 July 1999, Dobrucki won the Continental Final, which formed part of the 2000 Speedway Grand Prix Qualification. He went on to qualify as a permanent rider for the 2000 Speedway Grand Prix. In 2003, he won the Polish pairs title.

Dobrucki rode in the British leagues after joining the Oxford Silver Machine in 2004.

== Speedway Grand Prix results ==
1997 Speedway Grand Prix Final Championship standings (Riding No 16)
Race no.	Grand Prix	Pos.	Pts.	Heats	Draw No
5 /6	(Poland) Polish SGP	16	1	(0,0,1,1,1) +0D	6

1999 Speedway Grand Prix Final Championship standings (Riding No 24)
Race no.	Grand Prix	Pos.	Pts.	Heats	Draw No
3 /6	(Poland) Polish SGP	10	8	(3,0,3) (1,3,1)	24

2000 Speedway Grand Prix Final Championship standings (Riding No 22)
Race no.	Grand Prix	Pos.	Pts.	Heats	Draw No
1 /6	(Czech Republic) Czech Rep. SGP	18	4	(1,3,1)	22
2 /6	(Sweden) Swedish SGP	20	3	(1,2,0)	18
3 /6	(Poland) Polish SGP	20	3	(1,3,0)	19
4 /6	(United Kingdom) British SGP	injury → (25) John Jørgensen			19
5 /6	(Denmark) Danish SGP	24	1	(0,0)	22
6 /6	(Europe) European SGP	15	5	(2,2,) (1,0)	22

2004 Speedway Grand Prix Final Championship standings (Riding No 27)
Race no.	Grand Prix	Pos.	Pts.	Heats	Draw No
2 /9	(Czech Republic) Czech Rep. SGP	16	5	(1,3,3) (0,E)	15

permanent speedway rider
wild card, track reserve or qualified reserve
rider not classified (track reserve who did not start)

== Career ==
=== Individual World Championship ===
- 1997 - 23rd place (1 points)
- 1999 - 25th place (8 points)
- 2000 - 21st place (16 points)
- 2004 - 29th place (5 points)

=== Individual U-21 World Championship ===
- 1995 - 11th place (6 points)
- 1996 - 6th place (10 points)
- 1997 - 2nd place (11 points +3)

=== Team World Championship ===
- 1995 - 6th place (0 points)
- 1996 - 2 points in Group A
- 1999 - 6 points in Semi-Final B
- 2000 - 4 points in Semi-Final A

=== European Club Champions' Cup ===
- 2000 - European Champion (13 points)
- 2009 - (Poland) Toruń - European Champion (8 pts) Rivne

=== Individual Polish Championship ===
- 1995 - 3rd place
- 2010 - 3rd place

=== Individual U-21 Polish Championship ===
- 1994 - 3rd place
- 1995 - Polish Champion
- 1996 - 2nd place
- 1997 - 3rd place

=== Golden Helmet ===
- 1998 - 2nd place
- 1999 - 3rd place
- 2007 - 2nd place

=== Silver Helmet (U-21) ===
- 1995 - Winner
- 1996 - 3rd place
- 1997 - Winner

=== Bronze Helmet (U-19) ===
- 1993 - 3rd place
- 1994 - 2nd place
- 1995 - Winner

== See also ==
- List of Speedway Grand Prix riders
- Poland speedway team
