= Michal Makovský =

Czech speedway rider

- Born: 6 April 1976 (age 50); Hradec Králové, Czechoslovakia
- Nationality: Czech

Career history

Poland
- 1998–1999: Rawicz
- 2000: Tarnów

Great Britain
- 2000–2010: Berwick

Team honours
- 2002: Premier League Four-Team Championship

Michal Makovský (born 6 April 1976) is a former motorcycle speedway rider from the Czech Republic. He earned three international caps for the Czech Republic national speedway team.

== Career ==
Makovský started in the 2000 Speedway Grand Prix of Czech Republic and 2001 Speedway World Cup.

In 2001, Makovský re-signed for Berwick Bandits along with fellow Czechs Josef Franc and Adrian Rymel. He rode for Berwick for ten years between 2000 and 2010. In 2002, he was part of the Berwick four that won the Premier League Four-Team Championship, which was held on 21 July 2002, at Brandon Stadium.

== Results ==
=== World Championships ===
- Individual World Championship (Speedway Grand Prix)
  - 2000 - 32nd place (1 pt in one event)
- Team World Championship (Speedway World Team Cup and Speedway World Cup)
  - 1999 - (Czech Republic) Pardubice - Runner-up (8 pts)
  - 2001 - (Poland) - 7th place
- Individual U-21 World Championship
  - 1996 - (Germany) Olching - 7th place (8 pts)
  - 1997 - (Czech Republic) Mšeno - 8th place (8 pts)

=== European Championships ===
- European Club Champions' Cup
  - 2000 - (Poland) Piła - 4th place (4 pts) for Pardubice

=== Domestic competitions ===
- Team Polish Championship (League)
  - 1998 - 6th place in Second League for Rawicz (Average 2.000)
  - 1999 - 8th place in Second League for Rawicz (Average 1.886)
  - 2000 - 2nd place in Second League for Tarnów (Average 2.366)

== See also ==
- Czech Republic national speedway team
- List of Speedway Grand Prix riders
