= Ryan Sullivan =

Australian speedway rider

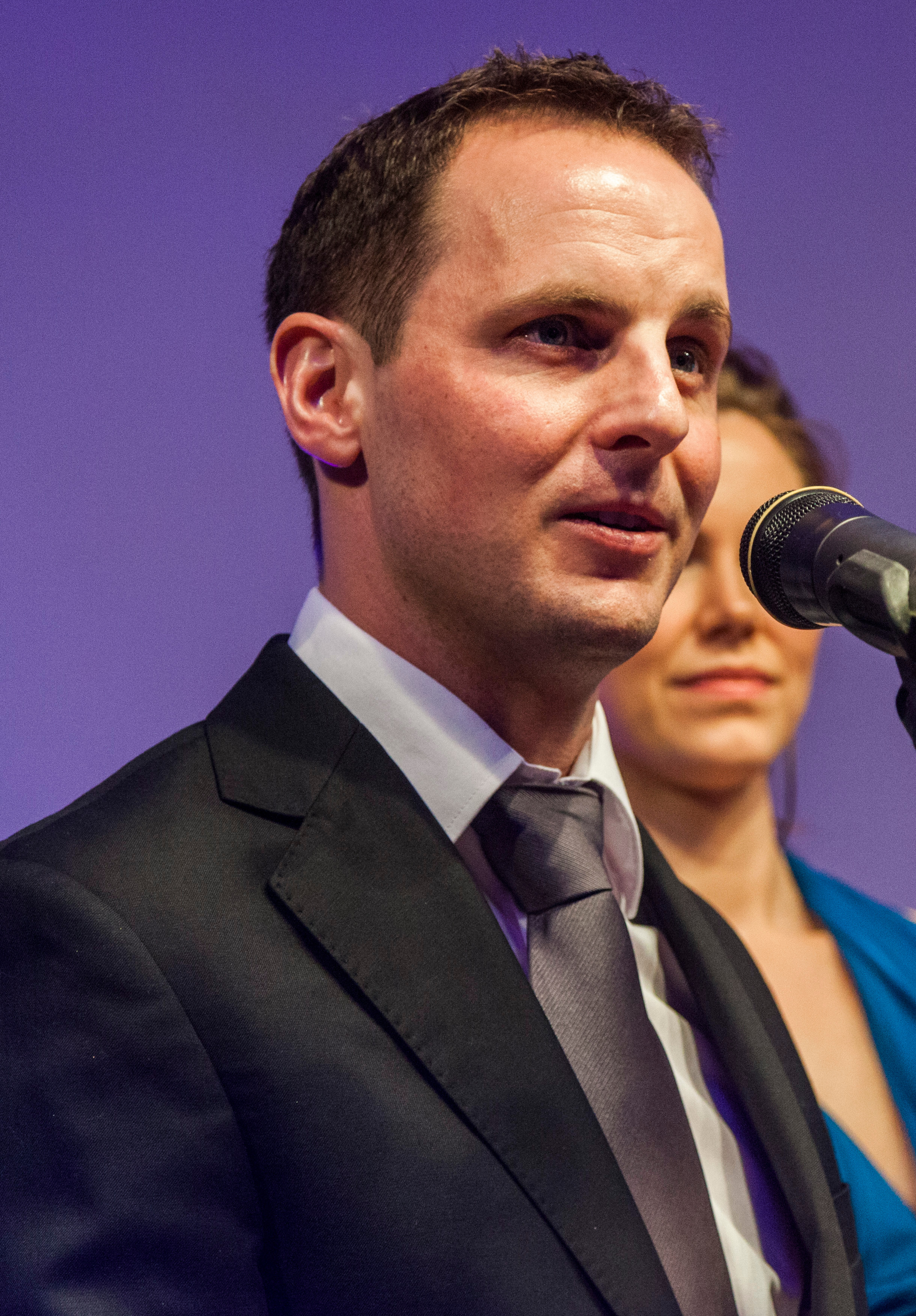
- Born: 20 January 1975 (age 51); Fitzroy, Victoria
- Nationality: Australian

Career history

Great Britain
- 1994–1997, 1999–2003, 2006, 2008, 2012: Peterborough Panthers
- 1998, 2004–2005: Poole Pirates

Poland
- 1996–1998, 2000, 2007–2013: Toruń
- 1999: Bydgoszcz
- 2001–2006: Częstochowa

Sweden
- 1997–1998, 2003–2004: Kaparna
- 1999–2002, 2009–2010: Rospiggarna
- 2005–2008: Piraterna
- 2011: Indianerna

Denmark
- 2007: Brovst
- 2010: Slangerup

Individual honours
- 1997: Intercontinental Champion
- 1995: Overseas Champion
- 2004: Australian Champion
- 1995, 1996, 1997: South Australian Champion
- 1993, 1996: Australian Under-21 Champion
- 1991: Australian Under-16 Champion
- 1997, 2003: Golden Helmet of Pardubice
- 2000: Elite League Riders' Champion

Team honours
- 1999: World Team Cup
- 2001, 2002: World Cup
- 1997: Elite League Fours Winner
- 1997: Swedish Allsvenskan
- 1999, 2001, 2004: Elite League Champion
- 1999, 2004: Elite League KO Cup Winner
- 1999: Craven Shield Winner
- 2001, 2002, 2003: Swedish Elitserien
- 2003: Polish Extraleague

Ryan Geoffrey Sullivan (born 20 January 1975, in Fitzroy, Victoria) is a former Australian international motorcycle speedway rider who has won the Australian Solo Championship, Australian Under-21 Speedway Championship, and Under-16 championships during his career. Sullivan achieved a career best third in the 2002 Speedway Grand Prix, winning two of the ten Grand Prix run during the year.

== Career ==
=== Australia ===
Sullivan's family moved from Melbourne to Adelaide in the late 1970s, and as a child Sullivan played Australian Rules Football, but became interested in speedway when it became obvious that he was not of the ideal build to be a league footballer.

Sullivan's parents bought him a junior speedway bike and he had his first ride at the Olympic Park Speedway in Mildura in 1985, although his home track was the Sidewinders Speedway in the Adelaide suburb of Wingfield, a 112m long track run by the Sidewinders Junior Speedway Club solely aimed at junior Motorcycle speedway development. Within a few seasons Sullivan was seen as one of the best junior riders in South Australia, winning the South Australian Under-16 Individual title in 1990 and 1991 while winning the Pairs Championships in 1988, 1989, 1990 and 1991.

Sullivan finished in second place at the 1990 Australian Under-16 Championship in Perth behind Jason Crump. He would go one better on 12 January 1991 winning his first individual Australian title at his home track in Adelaide. Sullivan won three Australian Under-16 Pairs Championships, first in 1989 with Brett Tomkins, and backing that up in 1990 teaming with fellow Adelaide rider Troy Norvil. He won his third and last junior pairs title on 13 January 1991 paired with Brett Woodifield.

Sullivan's first senior speedway championship came on 14 April 1991 when he won the track championship at the Westline Speedway in South Australia's Whyalla. Sullivan was unbeaten in the heats to finish on 12 points before going on to win the final from Paul Schevienen and Troy Norvill. After having gained his motor mechanic qualifications at age 19, Sullivan was regarded one of the best young riders in Australia, going on to win three South Australian Championships in succession in 1995, 1996 and 1997, and the Australian Under-21 Championship in 1993 and 1996 (the championship was not held in 1994 or 1995). Other than his 1993 Under-21 title which was won at the Olympic Park Speedway in Mildura, his 1996 U/21 title and his state title wins came at his home track, the North Arm Speedway. Sullivan's also won round 4 of the 1996 Australian Speedway Masters Series 500 at the 510 metres (560 yd) Wayville Showground.

Sullivan scored his first podium finish in the Australian Championship in 1997 at the Brisbane Exhibition Ground when he finished equal second on points with Jason Crump, but lost a run-off to Crump and was credited with third place. He again finished in third place in 2002 at the Wayville Showground.

In 2004, Sullivan became the first South Australian rider to win the Australian Championship since John Boulger in 1973. Sullivan was undefeated over the three rounds held at the Gold Coast, Gosford and Olympic Park speedways. He defeated defending champion Leigh Adams who finished 2nd in all three rounds. This would prove to be Sullivan's only Australian Championship win and the final time he stood on the podium of the event.

=== England ===
Sullivan spent most of his British career with the Peterborough Panthers, starting in 1994. He won the Elite League Riders' Championship, held at the Brandon Stadium on 21 October 2000.

Although he had not ridden in Britain since 2006, in August 2008, Sullivan returned to ride for Peterborough until the end of that season. He has also ridden for the Poole Pirates but returned to the Panthers on a full transfer in 2006. He went on to ride in Sweden (Rospiggarna), Poland (Unibax Torun) and Russia (Togliatti). He returned to Peterborough in 2012 to replace the injured Kenneth Bjerre, but suffered a hand injury which ended his season and led to announcing his retirement from the sport in March 2013.

=== International ===
Sullivan qualified for the 1995 and 1996 Under-21 World Championships. He finished third in 1995 at the Kaanaa Speedway Stadium in Tampere, Finland, finishing in a 4-way tie on 12 points before winning the runoff for third place. In his final shot at winning the title before turning 22, he improved to second in 1996 behind Poland's Piotr Protasiewicz, at the Speedwaybahn in Olching, Germany.

Sullivan's first major international career win came when he defeated Leigh Adams in a runoff to win the 1995 Overseas Final in Coventry, England. Sullivan became the first Australian winner of the Overseas Final which had been in place since 1981. In 1997, Sullivan became the first Australian to win the Intercontinental Final when he led home an Aussie 1-2-3 (with Jason Crump and Craig Boyce) in Västervik, Sweden.

In both 1997 and 2003, Sullivan won the prestigious Golden Helmet of Pardubice at the Svítkov Stadion in the Czech Republic, his 1997 title being the first for any Australian rider.

In 1999, Sullivan was part of the Australian team that took out the Speedway World Team Cup, Australia's first WTC win since 1976. He was also a member of the team when Australia won the Speedway World Cup in 2001 and 2002. He finished second in the SWC in 2003, third in 2007 and fourth in both 2006 and 2008.

Sullivan's last major win came in 2009 at the Alfred Smoczyk Memorial in Leszno, Poland.

=== Speedway Grand Prix ===
Sullivan was a Speedway Grand Prix rider from 1998 until 2006 and won four Grand Prix meetings. In the 2002 Speedway Grand Prix series he won the British Grand Prix in Cardiff and the Slovenian Grand Prix in Krško. In the 2003 Speedway Grand Prix series he won the Swedish Grand Prix in Avesta and the Scandinavian Grand Prix in Gothenburg, Sweden.

In September 2008, Sullivan made it through to the Grand Prix Challenge – the final of the 2009 Grand Prix qualification rounds. Despite winning his first three heats, he only scored one point in his following two rides and failed to qualify for the 2009 Speedway Grand Prix.

== World Final Appearances ==
=== World Team Cup ===
- 1999 - (Czech Republic) Pardubice, Svítkov Stadion (with Jason Crump / Jason Lyons / Leigh Adams / Todd Wiltshire) - Winner - 40pts (12)
- 2000 - (England) Coventry, Brandon Stadium (with Jason Crump / Todd Wiltshire / Leigh Adams / Craig Boyce) - 4th - 29pts (2)

=== World Cup ===
- 2001 - (Poland) Wrocław, Olympic Stadium (with Jason Crump / Todd Wiltshire / Craig Boyce / Leigh Adams) - Winner - 68pts (13)
- 2002 - Peterborough, East of England Showground (with Todd Wiltshire / Jason Lyons / Leigh Adams / Jason Crump) - Winner - 64pts (17)
- 2003 - (Denmark) Vojens, Speedway Center (with Jason Crump / Todd Wiltshire / Jason Lyons / Leigh Adams) - 2nd - 57pts (10)
- 2006 - (England) Reading, Smallmead Stadium (with Travis McGowan / Todd Wiltshire / Leigh Adams / Jason Crump) - 4th - 35pts (4)
- 2007 - (Poland) Leszno, Alfred Smoczyk Stadium (with Jason Crump / Chris Holder / Leigh Adams / Davey Watt / Rory Schlein) - 3rd - 29pts (7)
- 2008 - (Denmark) Vojens, Speedway Center (with Leigh Adams / Chris Holder / Jason Crump / Davey Watt) - 4th - 21pts (5)

=== Individual Under-21 World Championship ===
- 1995 - (Finland) Tampere, Kaanaa Speedway Stadium - 3rd - 12+3pts
- 1996 - (Germany) Olching, Olching Speedwaybahn - 2nd - 11+3pts

== Speedway Grand Prix results ==
Year	Position	Points	Best finish	Notes
1998	7th	68	2nd	Second in Polish Grand Prix
1999	10th	55	3rd	Third in Poland II Grand Prix
2000	9th	62	2nd	Second in British Grand Prix
2001	4th	80	3rd	Third in Swedish Grand Prix
2002	3rd	158	Winner	Won British and Slovenian Grand Prix
2003	9th	94	Winner	Won Swedish and Scandinavian Grand Prix
2004	13th	65	4th	
2005	14th	45	6th	
2006	18th	10	4th	
