= Todd Wiltshire =

Australian speedway rider

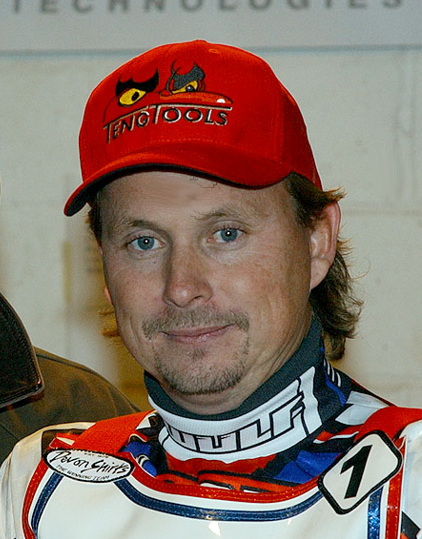
- Todd Wiltshire in 2004
- Born: 26 September 1968 (age 58); Bankstown, New South Wales
- Nationality: Australian

Career history

Great Britain
- 1988-1989: Wimbledon Dons
- 1990-1992: Reading Racers
- 1998-2001, 2003, 2006: Oxford Cheetahs

Poland
- 1991, 1998: Częstochowa
- 1997: Gdańsk
- 1999: Rybnik
- 2000-2003: Bydgoszcz

Sweden
- 1991, 1999–2003: Skepparna/Västervik

Individual honours
- 1987, 1988: ACT State Champion
- 1989: Scottish Open Champion
- 1990, 2000, 2001: NSW State Champion
- 1990: British Speedway Rider of the Year
- 1990: Billy Sanders Australian Open winner
- 1991: Mr Melbourne winner
- 1997, 1998: German Champion
- 1999, 2001: Australian Champion
- 1999: Intercontinental Champion

Team honours
- 1990: British League winner
- 1990: British League Knockout Cup winner
- 1991: Australian Best Pairs Champion
- 1999: Speedway World Team Cup
- 2001, 2002: Speedway World Cup

Todd Wiltshire (born 26 September 1968 in Bankstown, New South Wales) is an Australian former motorcycle speedway rider, who competed at the highest level of the sport, finishing a career best third in the 1990 Individual Speedway World Championship at the Odsal Stadium in Bradford, England. He is also a two time Australian Champion, winning in 1999 and 2001.

== Career ==
=== Australia ===
Despite being born in Sydney, Wiltshire spent most of his childhood in Newcastle. He started racing in 1979 at the Lake Macquarie Mini-Cycle Club, giving his older sister Fiona the credit for getting him started in racing saying she was his inspiration through her own involvement in dirt track racing. Wiltshire won numerous junior titles before capturing the Australian 500cc championship in his first senior year in 1986.

Seeking a new challenge Wiltshire turned to Speedway in late 1986 and won the ACT Championship in both 1987 and 1988 at the Tralee Speedway in Australia's capital city Canberra and quickly established himself as one of the most promising young riders in Australia, finishing fourth in the 1989 Australian Under-21 Championship in Mildura. He won his first major senior title in 1990 taking out the New South Wales Championship at his home track, the Newcastle Motordrome, which had become the centre of Solo racing in NSW following the closure of the Liverpool City Raceway in 1989 and with the Sydney Showground Speedway only holding one or two meetings per year. Due to family commitments, he missed the Australian Final, but was seeded directly into the 1990 Commonwealth Final at the Belle Vue Stadium in Manchester, England, where he finished a respectable sixth to qualify for the 1990 Overseas Final. At the Overseas final, he finished second to qualify for the 1990 Intercontinental Final. Wiltshire finished 11th in Vojens in Denmark to be the only Australian and final qualifier for the World Final in Bradford

Wiltshire finished a surprise third at the 1990 World Final in Bradford, winning three of his five rides and finishing only one point behind winner Per Jonsson and Shawn Moran (Moran was later stripped of his second place after it was revealed he had failed a drug test at the Overseas Final. The FIM did not upgrade the standings and the official records show no second place rider). Big things were expected of him during the 1990/91 Australian season but he suffered something of a form slump. After losing his NSW crown to Craig Boyce, he would only manage 5th in the Australian Championship at the 402 metres (440 yd) Arunga Park Speedway in Alice Springs, though he paired with Boyce (who won the individual title) to win the Australian Pairs Championship a night earlier.

Wiltshire's 1990/91 Australian season did include success in some of the bigger meetings. On 8 December, he captained NSW to a win over the touring Russian team at the Motordrome, being unbeaten in his five rides. It was the Russians first loss on their Australian tour. He then won the Billy Sanders Australian Open on 28 December, defeating Leigh Adams, Sam Ermolenko and Troy Butler in the final. On 23 February, he became the first Australian rider to win the now defunct "Mr. Melbourne" title at the Royal Melbourne Showgrounds. A week earlier, he had finished second to Australian teammate and local rider Shane Bowes in the "West End Speedway International" at the Wayville Showgrounds.

Wiltshire headed back to the United Kingdom but failed to re-capture his previous seasons form and the World #3 failed to make the World Final in 1991. After finishing third in the 1992 NSW title behind winner Mick Poole and Craig Boyce at the Nepean Speedway, Wiltshire was seeded to ride in the 1992 Australian Championship to be held at the North Arm Speedway in Adelaide. During his first ride of the meeting (Heat 3), and after leading three-quarters of the race, he was passed on the inside of the back straight by Jason Lyons. Going into turn 3, Wiltshire fell while attempting to re-pass Lyons on the outside and slid into the safety fence, suffering terrible back injuries and multiple fractures of the Pelvis which forced him to spend a number of days recovering in the Royal Adelaide Hospital. Thankfully, his spinal cord was not damaged in the crash, however the injuries were bad enough that the 23-year-old Wiltshire decided to retire from racing.

After making a comeback to racing in Germany during 1997, Wiltshire won his first Australian Solo Championship in 1999 at the Olympic Park Speedway. He then went on to win the NSW Championship in 2000 and 2001 before winning his second Australian title at the Riverview Speedway in Murray Bridge in 2001. After finishing 4th at Wayville in 2002, Wiltshire returned to the podium in 2003, finishing second to Leigh Adams in Gosford. He would finish third in 2004 (the first year the Australian Championship was run as a series rather than in the traditional single meeting format), before finishing second again in 2006 (again to Leigh Adams). Following his second placing in 2006, Wiltshire announced his retirement from racing.

In 2011, the Kurri Kurri Speedway club at the Loxford Park Speedway decided to honour Wiltshire as one of the Hunter Region's former Solo riders by incorporating the Todd Wiltshire Cup for junior solos. The inaugural meeting was won by NSW rider Jack Holder who scored a perfect 15-point maximum. Brady Kurtz from Cowra and Max Fricke from Victoria rounded out the podium places with Wiltshire himself on hand to award the winners trophy's.

=== England ===
Starting in 1988, Wiltshire rode for the Wimbledon Dons in the National League, helping the Dons to finish runners-up in the Knock-Out Cup in 1988 and second in the league in 1989. Wiltshire also won the Scottish Open Championship in 1989.

Wiltshire moved up to the first division in 1990 with Reading Racers where he was voted British speedway rider of the year after finishing third in the World Final at Bradford. While with Reading where he was teammate to Per Jonsson, Wiltshire would win both the British League and British League Knockout Cup in 1990.

Wiltshire had three spells with the Oxford Cheetahs from 1998 to 2001, where he was part of the Elite League title winning team in 2001. After not racing for Oxford in the 2002 season, due to a rule capping the number of Grand Prix riders in Elite League teams, he returned to the team in 2003 and he also made a short-lived but successful comeback in 2006 for the Cheetahs before retiring for the last time.

=== Germany ===
Following his crash at the 1992 Australian Championships which had forced his retirement, Wiltshire made a comeback in 1997, riding in Germany in a bid to gain a place in the Speedway Grand Prix after being denied a licence to race in the United Kingdom. Though he won the German Individual Championship in both 1997 and 1998, he failed to qualify for the SGP until 2000.

=== International ===
Wiltshire first made his mark on the international scene when he was a surprise qualifier for the 1990 Individual Speedway World Championship to be held at the Odsal Stadium. Wiltshire had qualified for the final after finishing sixth in the Commonwealth Final, second in the Overseas Final, and was the lucky last qualifier from the Intercontinental Final. He would surprise further by winning his first two races in the World Final before eventually finishing third, only one point behind Reading teammate Per Jonsson who defeated Shawn Moran in a runoff after both finished on 13 points (Moran was later stripped of second place after failing a drug test at the Overseas Final three months prior to the World Final). Despite Moran's disqualification, the FIM did not upgrade placings and Wiltshire remains in 3rd place in the record books with no second place medal awarded.

Wiltshire followed up his third placing in the Individual Final with second in the 1990 Speedway World Pairs Championship at the Ellermühle Stadium in Landshut, Germany, paired with fellow Aussie Leigh Adams. Wiltshire and Adams finished two points behind defending champions Jan O. Pedersen and Hans Nielsen. With 25 points, Wiltshire was the meetings top scorer with three wins, a second and two third placings from his six rides.

Following his win in the Australian Championship in 1999, Wiltshire was given a birth in the Overseas Final. He finished fourth to easily qualify for the Intercontinental Final. He won the 1999 IC Final which gave him an automatic berth in the 2000 Speedway Grand Prix. He would ride in the SGP from 2000 until 2003 though he never managed to achieve higher than second place in a Grand Prix event.

Wiltshire was also part of the Australian team which won the 1999 Speedway World Team Cup, the first time since 1976 that Australia had won the title, as well as representing Australia in numerous test matches around the world. He repeated the success in both 2001 and 2002 (the Speedway World Team Cup was replaced after 2000 with the Speedway World Cup).

== World Final Appearances ==
=== Individual World Championship ===
- 1990 - (United Kingdom) Bradford, Odsal Stadium - 3rd - 12pts

=== World Pairs Championship ===
- 1990 - (Germany) Landshut, Ellermühle Stadium (with Leigh Adams) - 2nd - 41pts (25)

=== World Team Cup ===
- 1999 - (Czech Republic) Pardubice, Svítkova Stadion (with Leigh Adams / Jason Crump / Ryan Sullivan / Jason Lyons) - Winner - 55pts (2)
- 2000 - (United Kingdom) Coventry, Brandon Stadium (with Jason Crump / Leigh Adams / Ryan Sullivan / Craig Boyce) - 4th - 29pts (2)

=== World Cup ===
- 2001 - (Poland) Wrocław, Olympic Stadium (with Jason Crump / Craig Boyce / Ryan Sullivan / Leigh Adams) - Winner - 68pts (10)
- 2002 - (United Kingdom) Peterborough, East of England Showground (with Leigh Adams / Jason Lyons / Jason Crump / Ryan Sullivan) - Winner - 64pts (13)
- 2003 - (Denmark) Vojens, Speedway Center (with Jason Crump / Jason Lyons / Ryan Sullivan / Leigh Adams) - 2nd - 57pts (15)
- 2006 - (United Kingdom) Reading, Smallmead Stadium (with Travis McGowan / Ryan Sullivan / Leigh Adams / Jason Crump) - 4th - 35pts (8)

== Speedway Grand Prix results ==
Year	Position	Points	Best finish	Notes
2000	8th	63	3rd	Third in Swedish Grand Prix
2001	8th	56	6th	
2002	15th	63	2nd	Second in British Grand Prix
2003	19th	30	14th	
