= Carl Stonehewer =

British motorcycle speedway rider

- Born: 16 May 1972 (age 54); Manchester, England
- Nationality: British (English)

Career history

Great Britain
- 1988-1989, 1991-1993, 2003: Belle Vue Aces
- 1990: Wolverhampton Wolves
- 1994: Peterborough Panthers
- 1995-1997: Long Eaton Invaders
- 1998: Sheffield Tigers
- 1999-2005, 2007-2008: Workington Comets
- 2009: Redcar Bears

Poland
- 1999-2001: Zielona Góra
- 2002: Piła

Sweden
- 2000: Lindarna
- 2000-2003: Smederna

Individual honours
- 2000, 2001: Premier League Riders Champion

Team honours
- 1993: Elite League Champion
- 1997, 2001, 2004, 2008: Premier League Four-Team Champion
- 1997, 1999, 2000, 2001, 2003: Premier League Pairs Champion
- 2008: Young Shield winner

Carl Bryan Stonehewer (born 16 May 1972) is a former motorcycle speedway rider from England. He earned seven international caps for the England national speedway team and five caps for the Great Britain team.

== Career ==
Stonehewer's principal club in Britain were Belle Vue Aces and Workington Comets.

In 1997, Stonehewer won the Premier League Pairs Championship partnering Martin Dixon for the Long Eaton Invaders, during the 1997 Premier League speedway season. The success was the first of five Pairs championships. He was also part of the Long Eaton four that won the Premier League Four-Team Championship, which was held on 3 August 1997, at the East of England Arena.

In 1999, Stonehewer won the Premier League Pairs Championship again, partnering Brent Werner, during his first season with Workington. He successfully defended the title the following season but this time partnering Mick Powell during the 2000 Premier League speedway season.

Also in 2000, Stonehewer won the Polish Speedway Second League with Zielona Góra and won the Premier League Riders Championship, held on 10 September at Owlerton Stadium.

In 2001, Stonehewer recorded his a fourth Premier League Pairs success; once again as a Workington rider he partnered Peter Ingvar Karlsson. The success continued as he won the Premier League Riders Championship for the second successive season.

Stonehewer's last of a record five Pairs titles came in 2003 with Simon Stead. All five of his titles had been achieved with different partners. In 2004, he was part of the Workington four that won the Premier League Four-Team Championship, which was held on 21 August 2004, at the Derwent Park.

Stonehewer announced his retirement in early 2006 after suffering horrific friction burns in a freak racing accident in 2005. In April 2007, it was announced he was returning to the Workington Comets team.

Stonehewer was part of the Workington four who won the Premier League Four-Team Championship, held on 26 July 2008, at Derwent Park. It was Stonehewer's fourth fours title.

== Major results ==
=== Speedway Grand Prix ===
- The first UK Premier League rider to qualify for the Speedway Grand Prix.
  - Grand Prix Series Rider 2000, 2001, 2002
  - Grand Prix Challenge 1999 (3rd), 2000 (2nd)

Speedway Grand Prix results

Year	Position	Points	Best Finish	Notes
2000	18th	30	8th	
2001	12th	46	7th	
2002	19th	30	5th	Did not ride in three GP meetings due to injury.

=== World Team Cup ===
- World Team Cup 2000, 2001, 2002 (Great Britain)
  - World Team Cup Silver Medal 2000
