= Speedway World Championship Competitions =

Motorcycle speedway competitions

There are annual world championship events in the sport of motorcycle speedway for individual riders - the Speedway Grand Prix - and for national teams - the Speedway World Cup. Each has a counterpart for riders under 21: the Speedway World Under 21 Championship and the Team Speedway Junior World Championship. A pairs event, the Speedway World Pairs Championship, ran until 1993.

In addition there are two Ice Speedway World Championships for individuals and teams. The first Ice World Championships were held in 1966.

Another form of speedway on larger tracks takes place called Longtrack and there is a World Championship called the Individual Speedway Long Track World Championship. Since 1998 it has been a combination of grasstrack and longtrack

Competing entities	Competition name	First held	Current holder	Next	Held every
Individuals	Unofficial Speedway World Championships (1931–1935) Official Speedway World Championship (1936–1994); Speedway Grand Prix (since 1995)	1931	(Australia) Jason Doyle (2017)	2018	One year
Individuals	Individual Speedway World Under 21 Championship	1977	(Poland) Maksym Drabik (2017)	2018	One year
National Pairs	Speedway World Pairs Championship	1970	Sweden (1993)	Defunct	One year until 1993
National Teams:	Speedway World Team Cup (1960–2000); Speedway World Cup (since 2001)	1960	Poland (2017)	2018	One year
National Teams:	Team Speedway Junior World Championship	2005	Poland (2017)	2018	One year
Individuals:	Individual Ice Speedway World Championship	1966	(Russia) Dmitry Koltakov (2017)	2018	One year
Individuals:	Team Ice Racing World Championship	1979	(Russia) Igor Kononov, Dmitry Khomitsevich, Dmitry Koltakov (2017)	2018	One year
Individuals:	Individual Speedway Long Track World Championship	1971	(France) Mathieu Trésarrieu (2017)	2018	One year
