= 2012 Individual Ice Racing World Championship =

Motorcycle ice speedway race

Seasons
- ← 2011 2013 →

The 2012 FIM Ice Speedway World Championship was the 2012 version of FIM Individual Ice Racing World Championship season. The world champion was determined by eight races hosted in four cities, Krasnogorsk, Ufa, Assen and Uppsala between 4 February and 1 April 2012.

== Final Series ==
	Venue
1	(Russia) Krasnogorsk
2	(Russia) Krasnogorsk
3	(Russia) Ufa
4	(Russia) Ufa
5	(Netherlands) Assen
6	(Netherlands) Assen
7	(Sweden) Uppsala
8	(Sweden) Uppsala

== Classification ==
Pos	Rider	Pts
1	(Russia) Nikolay Krasnikov	148
2	(Russia) Daniil Ivanov	136
3	(Russia) Dmitry Khomitsevich	134
4	(Russia) Dmitry Koltakov	108
5	(Russia) Sergey Karachintsev	93
6	(Russia) Eduard Krysov	90
7	(Austria) Harald Simon	66
8	(Finland) Antti Aakko	55
9	(Austria) Franz Zorn	44
10	(Sweden) Robert Henderson	43
11	(Poland) Grzegorz Knapp	32
12	(Czech Republic) Jan Klatovsky	25
13	(Netherlands) Rene Stellingwerf	24
14	(Russia) Vitaly Khomitsevich	23
15	(Sweden) Stefan Svensson	18
16	(Finland) Mats Järf	18
17	(Germany) Max Niedermaier	15
18	(Sweden) Per-Olof Serenius	9
19	(Russia) Dmitry Bulankin	9
20	(Austria) Martin Josef Leitner	8

== See also ==
- 2012 Team Ice Racing World Championship
- 2012 Speedway Grand Prix in classic speedway
