= 2011 Individual Ice Racing World Championship =

Motorcycle ice speedway race

Seasons
- ← 2010 2012 →

The 2011 FIM Individual Ice Racing World Championship will be the 2011 version of FIM Individual Ice Racing World Championship season. The world champion will be determined in eight finals hosted in four cities between 5 February and 27 March 2011.

== Qualification ==
In three Qualifying Rounds will started 48 riders from 13 national federation and to Final series will qualify top 5 from each meetings and 6th placed riders from QR1 and QR2.

Qualifying Rounds	(Czech Republic)	(United Kingdom)	(Germany)	(Switzerland)	(France)	(Ukraine)	(Netherlands)	(Russia)	(Norway)	(Austria)	(Poland)	(Finland)	(Sweden)
QR1 (Austria) Sankt Johann	2		2	1			1	3	1	3		1	2
QR2 (Poland) Sanok	1		1		1	2		3		1	3	2	2
QR3 (Austria) Saalfelden	2	1	2	1			2	2		2		2	2

== Riders ==
There will be eighteen permanent riders. Seventeen riders was qualify from the qualifying rounds, and one permanent Wild Card will be nominatedand soon. There are no Wild Card and additional Track Reserve riders.

In all cases of absence of a scheduled rider, the draw number 17 track reserve rider shall be elevated for that meeting to take the place of that missing scheduled rider. In the case that there are 2 missing scheduled riders, then both track reserve riders (draw numbers 17 and 18) are elevated.

If a track reserve rider is promoted to the status of a scheduled rider and circumstances permit, a replacement track reserve rider shall be selected from the Substitute list based on their ranking for that year. The CCP Executive Secretariat will release the Substitute list along with the ballot for the first Final event.

A starting position draw for each final meeting will be balloted by the FIM.

=== Track reserves ===
After each Final, the 2 track reserve riders will become scheduled riders in the next Final, even if they have taken part in the Final where they are track reserve riders. Therefore, the 2 lowest point score riders (not being the 2 track reserve riders from that Final) on the Intermediate Classification will become track reserve in the next Final. The best placed rider will be the 1st track reserve rider with draw number 17 and the 2nd rider will be the 2nd track reserve with draw number 18.

=== Qualified riders ===
Top six riders from QR1 in Sankt Johann, Austria:

1. (Russia) Sergey Karachintsev
2. (Austria) Franz Zorn
3. (Russia) Ivan Ivanov
4. (Russia) Dmitri Bulankin
5. (Germany) Stefan Pletschacher
6. (Finland) Mats Jarf^{TR}

Top six riders from QR2 in Sanok, Poland:

1. (Russia) Nikolay Krasnikov
2. (Russia) Daniil Ivanov
3. (Sweden) Stefan Svensson
4. (Russia) Igor Kononov
5. (Poland) Grzegorz Knapp
6. (Czech Republic) Antonín Klatovský, Jr.^{TR}

Top five riders from QR3 in Saalfelden, Austria:^{a}

1. (Russia) Dmitry Khomitsevich
2. (Russia) Vitaly Khomitsevich
3. (Austria) Harald Simon
4. (Germany) Günther Bauer
5. (Sweden) Peter Koij

One rider nominated by FIM:

1. (Netherlands) Johnny Tuinstra
Notes:

TR. Jarf and Klatovský were qualify to the Final One (Day One) as a track reserve riders
a. QR3 hosted in Austria was co-organized by the Dutch federation

=== Qualified substitute ===
1. (Netherlands) René Stellingwerf
2. (Czech Republic) Jan Klatovský

== Final Series ==
#	Date	Venue	Winners	Runner-up	3rd place
1	February 5	(Russia) Krasnogorsk	(Russia) Nikolay Krasnikov	(Russia) Igor Kononov	(Russia) Dmitry Khomitsevich
2	February 6	(Russia) Krasnogorsk	(Russia) Nikolay Krasnikov	(Russia) Igor Kononov	(Russia) Daniil Ivanov
3	February 12	(Russia) Tolyatti	(Russia) Daniil Ivanov	(Russia) Dmitry Khomitsevich	(Russia) Nikolay Krasnikov
4	February 13	(Russia) Tolyatti	(Russia) Dmitry Khomitsevich	(Russia) Nikolay Krasnikov	(Russia) Igor Kononov
5	March 12	(Netherlands) Assen	(Russia) Igor Kononov	(Russia) Nikolay Krasnikov	(Russia) Daniil Ivanov
6	March 13	(Netherlands) Assen	(Russia) Daniil Ivanov	(Russia) Dmitry Khomitsevich	(Russia) Nikolay Krasnikov
7	March 26	(Germany) Inzell	(Russia) Nikolay Krasnikov	(Russia) Igor Kononov	(Russia) Daniil Ivanov
8	March 27	(Germany) Inzell	(Russia) Nikolay Krasnikov	(Russia) Igor Kononov	(Russia) Dmitry Khomitsevich

== Classification ==
The World Champion will be the rider having collected the most points at the end of the Championship. The track reserve riders are taken into account on the Final Overall Classification.

In case of one or more ties on the Intermediate Classification of the Championship, the following will apply:

1. Best place in the last Final run.

In case of riders involved in a tie on the Final Overall Classification at the end of the Championship, the following will apply:

1. Run-off for 1st, 2nd and 3rd place.
2. Best place in the last Final meeting.

Pos.	Rider	Points	(Russia)	(Russia)	(Russia)	(Russia)	(Netherlands)	(Netherlands)	(Germany)	(Germany)
1	(Russia) Nikolay Krasnikov	176	25	25	18	20	20	18	25	25
2	(Russia) Igor Kononov	153	20	20	16	18	25	14	20	20
3	(Russia) Daniil Ivanov	152	16	18	25	16	18	25	18	16
4	(Russia) Dmitry Khomitsevich	145	18	14	20	25	16	20	14	18
5	(Russia) Vitaly Khomitsevich	108	14	16	11	14	11	16	12	14
6	(Russia) Dmitry Bulankin	97	13	12	14	11	14	10	10	13
7	(Russia) Sergey Karachintsev	89	10	11	13	13	5	11	16	10
8	(Russia) Ivan Ivanov	85	12	13	12	9	12	12	7	8
9	(Sweden) Stefan Svensson	68	9	10	10	10	9	7	6	7
10	(Austria) Franz Zorn	73	7	6	8	7	7	13	13	12
11	(Austria) Harald Simon	72	8	7	7	6	13	9	11	11
12	(Germany) Günther Bauer	64	11	8	3	8	8	8	9	9
13	(Czech Republic) Antonín Klatovský	49	ns	9	9	12	6	4	8	1
14	(Poland) Grzegorz Knapp	35	4	4	6	0	10	6	4	1
15	(Sweden) Peter Koij	26	6	5	5	3	4	ns	3	0
16	(Germany) Stefan Pletschacher	20	5	3	ns	5	ns	3	1	3
17	(Finland) Mats Järf	9	0	0	ns	4	ns	5	–	–
18	(Netherlands) Johnny Tuinstra	7	3	ns	4	ns	–	–	–	–
19	(Germany) Max Neidermaier	7	–	–	–	–	–	–	4	3
20	(Czech Republic) Jan Klatovský	5	–	–	–	–	–	–	0	5
21	(Netherlands) René Stellingwerf	3	–	–	–	–	3	ns	–	–

== See also ==
- 2011 Team Ice Racing World Championship
- 2011 Speedway Grand Prix in classic speedway
