= 2013 Individual Ice Racing World Championship =

Motorcycle ice speedway race

Seasons
- ← 2012 2014 →

The 2013 FIM Ice Speedway World Championship was the 2013 version of FIM Individual Ice Racing World Championship season. The world champion was determined by ten races hosted in five cities, Krasnogorsk, Tolyatti, Assen, Inzell and Uppsala between 2 February and 24 March 2013.

== Final Series ==
	Venue
1	(Russia) Krasnogorsk
2	(Russia) Krasnogorsk
3	(Russia) Tolyatti
4	(Russia) Tolyatti
5	(Netherlands) Assen
6	(Netherlands) Assen
7	(Germany) Inzell
8	(Germany) Inzell
9	(Sweden) Uppsala
10	(Sweden) Uppsala

== Classification ==
Pos	Rider	Pts
1	(Russia) Daniil Ivanov	199
2	(Russia) Dmitry Koltakov	178
3	(Russia) Dmitry Khomitsevich	162
4	(Russia) Vitaly Khomitsevich	119
5	(Russia) Pavel Chaika	107
6	(Austria) Franz Zorn	104
7	(Russia) Eduard Krysov	82
8	(Austria) Harald Simon	76
9	(Sweden) Stefan Svensson	61
10	(Germany) Günther Bauer	59
11	(Poland) Grzegorz Knapp	51
12	(Czech Republic) Jan Klatovsky	32
13	(Sweden) Robert Henderson	24
14	(Germany) Stefan Pletschacher	23
15	(Russia) Sergey Karachintsev	18
16	(Russia) Sergey Makarov	16
17	(Netherlands) Rene Stellingwerf	15
18	(Finland) Antti Aakko	11
19	(Sweden) Per-Anders Lindstrom	10
20	(Germany) Max Niedermaier	7

== See also ==
- 2013 Team Ice Racing World Championship
- 2013 Speedway Grand Prix in classic speedway
