= 2014 Individual Ice Racing World Championship =

Motorcycle ice speedway race

Seasons
- ← 2013 2015 →

The 2014 FIM Ice Speedway Gladiators World Championship was the 2014 version of FIM Individual Ice Racing World Championship season. The world champion was determined by eight races hosted in four cities, Krasnogorsk, Blagoveshchensk, Assen and Inzell between 1 February and 23 March 2014.

== Final Series ==
#	Venue	Winners
1	(Russia) Krasnogorsk	(Russia) Daniil Ivanov
2	(Russia) Krasnogorsk	(Russia) Dmitry Koltakov
3	(Russia) Blagoveshchensk	(Russia) Daniil Ivanov
4	(Russia) Blagoveshchensk	(Russia) Daniil Ivanov
5	(Netherlands) Assen	(Russia) Daniil Ivanov
6	(Netherlands) Assen	(Russia) Dmitry Koltakov
7	(Germany) Inzell	(Russia) Dmitry Koltakov
8	(Germany) Inzell	(Russia) Daniil Ivanov

== Classification ==
Pos	Rider	Pts
1	(Russia) Daniil Ivanov	151
2	(Russia) Dmitry Koltakov	140
3	(Russia) Dmitry Khomitsevich	126
4	(Russia) Igor Kononov	107
5	(Russia) Sergey Makarov	102
6	(Sweden) Stefan Svensson	73
7	(Czech Republic) Jan Klatovsky	44
8	(Germany) Günther Bauer	40
9	(Germany) Stefan Pletschacher	34
10	(Poland) Grzegorz Knapp	31
11	(Sweden) Per-Anders Lindstrom	30
12	(Russia) Vitaly Khomitsevich	30
13	(Finland) Antti Aakko	28
14	(Russia) Pavel Chaika	27
15	(Germany) Max Niedermaier	25
16	(Netherlands) Rene Stellingwerf	21
17	(Germany) Johann Weber	15
18	(Russia) Vasily Kosov	14
19	(Finland) Tomi Tani	12
20	(Netherlands) Sven Holstein	10
20	(Russia) Sergey Logachev	10

== See also ==
- 2014 Team Ice Racing World Championship
- 2014 Speedway Grand Prix in classic speedway
