= 2016 Individual Ice Racing World Championship =

Motorcycle ice speedway race

Seasons
- ← 2015 2017 →

The 2016 FIM Ice Speedway Gladiators World Championship was the 2016 version of FIM Individual Ice Racing World Championship season. The world champion was determined by ten races hosted in five cities, Krasnogorsk, Almaty, Berlin, Assen and Inzell between 6 February and 20 March 2016.

== Final Series ==
	Venue	Winners
1	(Russia) Krasnogorsk	(Russia) Nikolay Krasnikov
2	(Russia) Krasnogorsk	(Russia) Dmitry Khomitsevich
3	(Kazakhstan) Almaty	(Russia) Igor Kononov
4	(Kazakhstan) Almaty	(Russia) Daniil Ivanov
5	(Germany) Berlin	(Russia) Dmitry Khomitsevich
6	(Germany) Berlin	(Russia) Igor Kononov
7	(Netherlands) Assen	(Russia) Dmitry Khomitsevich
8	(Netherlands) Assen	(Russia) Dmitry Khomitsevich
9	(Germany) Inzell	(Russia) Igor Kononov
10	(Germany) Inzell	(Russia) Dmitry Koltakov

== Classification ==
Pos	Rider	Pts
1	(Russia) Dmitry Khomitsevich	174
2	(Russia) Dmitry Koltakov	173
3	(Russia) Daniil Ivanov	165
4	(Russia) Igor Kononov	158
5	(Russia) Egor Myshkovets	117.5
6	(Austria) Franz Zorn	114
7	(Sweden) Stefan Svensson	68
8	(Sweden) Ove Ledström	60
9	(Germany) Günther Bauer	59.5
10	(Sweden) Niclas Svensson	57
11	(Sweden) Daniel Henderson	41
12	(Czech Republic) Jan Klatovsky	39
13	(Russia) Nikolay Krasnikov	33
14	(Germany) Max Niedermaier	28
15	(Austria) Manfred Seifter	28
16	(Germany) Stefan Pletschacher	28
17	(Finland) Antii Aakko	16
18	(Germany) Johann Weber	6
19	(Czech Republic) Antonin Klatovsky	4
20	(Germany) Luca Bauer	2

== See also ==
- 2016 Team Ice Racing World Championship
- 2016 Speedway Grand Prix in classic speedway
