= 2015 Individual Ice Racing World Championship =

Motorcycle ice speedway race

Seasons
- ← 2014 2016 →

The 2015 FIM Ice Speedway Gladiators World Championship was the 2015 version of FIM Individual Ice Racing World Championship season. The world champion was determined by ten races hosted in five cities Krasnogorsk, Tolyatti, Almaty, Assen and Inzell between 31 January and 15 March 2015.

== Final Series ==
	Venue	Winners
1	(Russia) Krasnogorsk	(Russia) Nikolay Krasnikov
2	(Russia) Krasnogorsk	(Russia) Nikolay Krasnikov
3	(Russia) Tolyatti	(Russia) Igor Kononov
4	(Russia) Tolyatti	(Russia) Igor Kononov
5	(Kazakhstan) Almaty	(Russia) Dmitry Koltakov
6	(Kazakhstan) Almaty	cancelled
7	(Netherlands) Assen	(Russia) Dmitry Koltakov
8	(Netherlands) Assen	(Russia) Daniil Ivanov
9	(Germany) Inzell	(Russia) Dmitry Koltakov
10	(Germany) Inzell	(Russia) Dmitry Koltakov

== Classification ==
Pos	Rider	Pts
1	(Russia) Dmitry Koltakov	180
2	(Russia) Daniil Ivanov	153
3	(Russia) Dmitry Khomitsevich	151
4	(Russia) Igor Kononov	150
5	(Russia) Vitaly Khomitsevich	124
6	(Austria) Franz Zorn	108
7	(Sweden) Stefan Svensson	72
8	(Austria) Harald Simon	68
9	(Czech Republic) Jan Klatovsky	58
10	(Czech Republic) Antonin Klatovsky	56
11	(Germany) Günther Bauer	55
12	(Germany) Hans Weber	42
13	(Russia) Nikolay Krasnikov	41
14	(Sweden) Per-Anders Lindstrom	22
15	(Sweden) Daniel Henderson	22
16	(Germany) Stefan Pletschacher	21
17	(Russia) Nikita Toloknov	16
18	(Finland) Mats Jarf	6
19	(Germany) Max Niedermaier	6
20	(Kazakhstan) Vladimir Cheblokov	2
20	(Sweden) Niclas Svenson	2

== See also ==
- 2015 Team Ice Racing World Championship
- 2015 Speedway Grand Prix in classic speedway
