= 2005 Individual Ice Speedway World Championship =

Motorcycle ice speedway race

Seasons
- ← 2004 2006 →

The 2005 Individual Ice Speedway World Championship was the 40th edition of the World Championship The Championship was held as a Grand Prix series over six rounds.

== Classification ==
Pos	Rider	Pts
1	(Russia) Nikolay Krasnikov	
2	(Russia) Vitaly Khomitsevich	
3	(Russia) Iwan Iwanov	
4	(Russia) Dmitry Bulankin	
5	(Russia) Vladimir Lumpov	
6	(Russia) Daniil Ivanov	
7	(Finland) Antti Aakko	
8	(Austria) Franz Zorn	
9	(Russia) Dmitry Khomitsevich	
10	(Russia) Mikhail Bogdanow	
11	(Sweden) Per-Olof Serenius	
12	(Germany) Robert Eibl	
13	(Netherlands) Johnny Tunistra	
14	(Germany) Günter Bauer	
15	(Austria) Markus Skabraut	
16	(Austria) Harald Simon	
17	(Czech Republic) Antonin Klatovsky	
18	(Sweden) Hans-Olov Olsson	
19	(Sweden) Torleif Burman	

== See also ==
- 2005 Speedway Grand Prix in classic speedway
- 2005 Team Ice Racing World Championship
