= 2009 Individual Ice Racing World Championship =

Motorcycle ice speedway race

Seasons
- ← 2008 2010 →

The 2009 FIM Ice Speedway World Championship was the 2009 version of FIM Individual Ice Racing World Championship season. The world champion was determined by eight races hosted in four cities.

== Classification ==
Pos	Rider	Pts
1	(Russia) Nikolay Krasnikov	200
2	(Russia) Daniil Ivanov	144
3	(Austria) Franz Zorn	129
4	(Russia) Junir Bazeev	127
5	(Russia) Dmitry Khomitsevich	108
6	(Russia) Vitaly Khomitsevich	103
7	(Russia) Pavel Chayka	88
8	(Germany) Günther Bauer	87
9	(Finland) Antti Aakko	77
10	(Russia) Antonín Klatovský	63
11	(Austria) Harald Simon	45
12	(Sweden) Stefan Svensson	45
13	(Netherlands) Johnny Tuinstra	43
14	(Finland) Tommy Flyktman	41
15	(Russia) Ivan Ivanov	39
16	(Austria) Markus Skabraut	37
17	(Finland) Kai Lehtinen	21
18	(Sweden) Per-Anders Lindström	17
19	(Netherlands) Sven Holstein	11
20	(Sweden) Hans-Olov Olsén	3

== See also ==
- 2009 Team Ice Racing World Championship
- 2009 Speedway Grand Prix in classic speedway
