= Harald Simon =

Austrian ice speedway rider

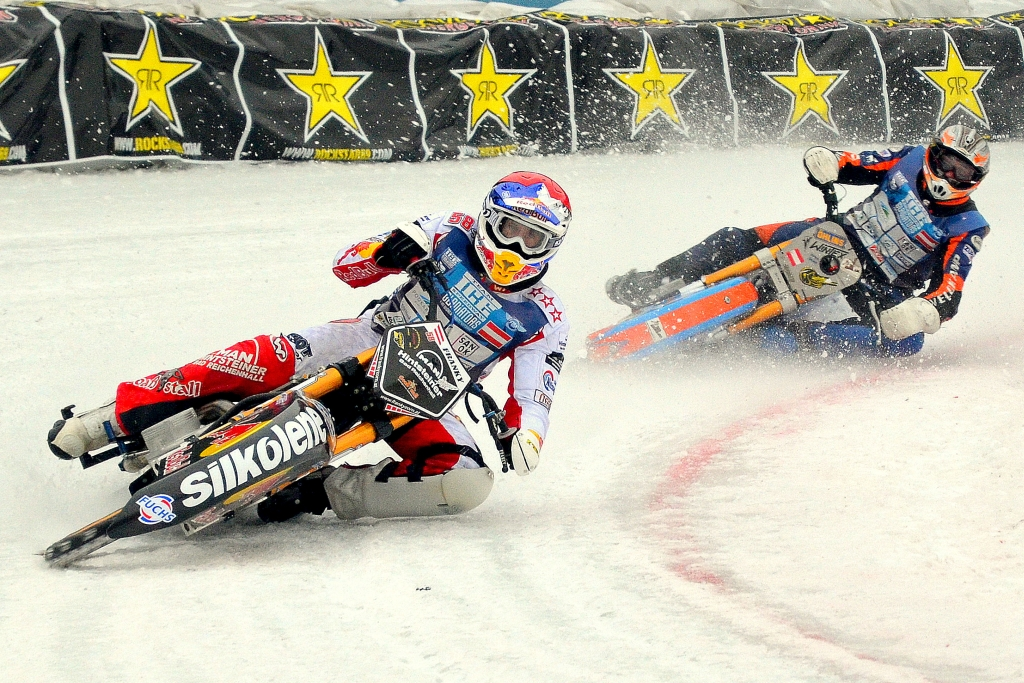
- Harald Simon trails Franz Zorn
- Born: March 14, 1967 (age 59); Austria
- Nationality: Austrian

Individual honours
- 2023: World Championship bronze medal
- 2022: European Champion

Team honours
- 6 x silver, 5 x bronze: Ice Speedway of Nations

Harald Simon (born 14 March 1967 in Austria) is an Austrian ice speedway rider.

== Career ==
Simon was part of the Austrian team that won 6 silver medals and 5 bronze medals in the Team Ice Racing World Championship from 1998 to 2020.

In 2022, Simon became the European champion at the age of 55.

In 2023, Simon won the bronze medal behind Martin Haarahiltunen and Franz Zorn in the 2023 Individual Ice Racing World Championship.

== Major results ==
=== Individual World Championship (Ice Racing Grand Prix) ===
- 1996 - 18th
- 2003 - 19th
- 2005 - 16th
- 2006 - 15th
- 2007 - 11th
- 2008 - 9th
- 2009 - 11th
- 2010 - 13th
- 2011 - 11th
- 2012 - 7th
- 2013 - 8th
- 2015 - 8th
- 2017 - 9th
- 2018 - 7th
- 2020 - 6th
- 2021 - 6th
- 2022 - 5th
- 2023 - bronze medal

=== Team World Championship ===
- 1998 - 4th
- 1999 - bronze medal
- 2000 - 4th
- 2002 - ?
- 2003 - ?
- 2004 - bronze medal
- 2005 - ?
- 2006 - ?
- 2007 - ?
- 2008 - silver medal
- 2009 - silver medal
- 2010 - bronze medal
- 2011 - silver medal
- 2012 - silver medal
- 2013 - silver medal
- 2014 - 4th
- 2015 - silver medal
- 2016 - bronze medal
- 2018 - bronze medal
- 2020 - 4th

=== Individual European Championship ===
- 2022 - Champion

== See also ==
- Austria national speedway team
