= 2019 Individual Ice Racing World Championship =

Motorcycle ice speedway race

The 2019 FIM Ice Speedway World Championship was the 54th edition of the FIM Individual Ice Racing World Championship season. The world champion was determined by ten races hosted in five cities Almata, Shadrinsk, Berlin, Inzell and Heerenveen between 2 February and 31 March 2019.

Daniil Ivanov won the World Championship series to become world champion for the third time.

== Final Series ==
	Venue	Date	Winners
1	(Kazakhstan) Almaty	2 February	(Russia) Dinar Valeev
2	(Kazakhstan) Almaty	3 February	(Russia) Daniil Ivanov
3	(Russia) Shadrinsk	9 February	(Russia) Daniil Ivanov
4	(Russia) Shadrinsk	10 February	(Russia) Dmitry Koltakov
5	(Germany) Berlin	2 March	(Russia) Dmitry Koltakov
6	(Germany) Berlin	3 March	(Russia) Dinar Valeev
7	(Germany) Inzell	16 March	(Russia) Daniil Ivanov
8	(Germany) Inzell	17 March	(Russia) Dinar Valeev
9	(Netherlands) Heerenveen	30 March	(Russia) Dmitry Koltakov
10	(Netherlands) Heerenveen	31 March	(Russia) Daniil Ivanov

== Classification ==
Pos	Rider	Pts
1	(Russia) Daniil Ivanov	172
2	(Russia) Dmitry Koltakov	168
3	(Russia) Dinar Valeev	162
4	(Russia) Dmitry Khomitsevich	158
5	(Germany) Johann Weber	89
6	(Sweden) Stefan Svensson	77
7	(Sweden) Niclas Svensson	74
8	(Sweden) Martin Haarahiltunen	68
9	(Russia) Nikita Toloknov	64
10	(Sweden) Ove Ledström	58
11	(Germany) Max Niedermaier	42
12	(Kazakhstan) Andrey Shishegov	36
13	(Austria) Charly Ebner	32
14	(Russia) Konstantin Kolenkin	22
15	(Austria) Franz Zorn	19
16	(Germany) Markus Jell	19
17	(Netherlands) Jasper Iwema	16
18	(Netherlands) Jimmy Tuinstra	13
19	(Russia) Dmitry Borodin	11
20	(Germany) Stefan Pletschacher	9
20	(Finland) Tomi Tani	9

== See also ==
- 2019 Ice Speedway of Nations
