= 2002 Individual Ice Speedway World Championship =

Motorcycle ice speedway race

Seasons
- ← 2001 2003 →

The 2002 Individual Ice Speedway World Championship was the 37th edition of the World Championship The Championship was held as a Grand Prix series over eight rounds.

== Classification ==
Pos	Rider	Pts
1	(Sweden) Per-Olof Serenius	
2	(Russia) Vjatjeslav Nikulin	
3	(Russia) Juri Polikarpov	
4	(Russia) Kirilł Drogalin	
5	(Germany) Günter Bauer	
6	(Finland) Antti Aakko	
7	(Czech Republic) Anatoly Klatovsky	
8	(Sweden) Stefan Svensson	
9	(Russia) Vladimir Fadeev	
10	(Austria) Franz Zorn	
11	(Russia) Valeri Perzew	
12	(Russia) Vitaly Khomitsevich	
13	(Russia) Vladimir Lumpov	
14	(Russia) Alexander Balashov	
15	(Belarus) Andrej Jakowlev	
16	(Netherlands) Tjitte Bootsma	
17	(Germany) Robert Eibl	
18	(Finland) Aki-Ala Rihimäki	
19	(Germany) Stephan Pletschacher	

== See also ==
- 2002 Speedway Grand Prix in classic speedway
- 2002 Team Ice Racing World Championship
