= 2021 Individual Ice Racing World Championship =

Ice speedway competition

The 2021 FIM Ice Speedway World Championship was the 56th edition of the FIM Individual Ice Racing World Championship season. Due to the continuing issues regarding the COVID-19 pandemic it was decided to hold a two-day final at the Anatoly Stepanov Stadium in Tolyatti, Russia, on 13 and 14 February 2021.

Dinar Valeev of Russia won the World Championship series to become world champion for the first time. Valeev defeated Igor Kononov in a race off after both riders finished on 36 points. Defending champion Daniil Ivanov finished fourth.

Russian athletes competed as neutral competitors using the designation MFR (Motorcycle Federation of Russia), as the Court of Arbitration for Sport upheld a ban on Russia competing at World Championships. The ban was implemented by the World Anti-Doping Agency in response to state-sponsored doping program of Russian athletes.

== Final Series ==
	Venue	Date	Winners
1	(Russia) Tolyatti	13 February	(Russia) Dmitry Khomitsevich
2	(Russia) Tolyatti	14 February	(Russia) Dinar Valeev

== Classification ==
Pos	Rider	Pts
1	(Russia) Dinar Valeev	36
2	(Russia) Igor Kononov	36
3	(Russia) Dmitry Khomitsevich	34
4	(Russia) Daniil Ivanov	30
5	(Russia) Nikita Toloknov	23
6	(Austria) Harald Simon	21
7	(Austria) Franz Zorn	21
8	(Kazakhstan) Andrey Shishegov	18
9	(Germany) Marcus Jell	16
10	(Finland) Aki Ala-Riihimäki	14
11	(Russia) Andrei Anisimov	12
12	(Czech Republic) Lukáš Hutla	11
13	(Czech Republic) Andrej Diviš	7
14	(Kazakhstan) Pavel Nekrassov	5
15	(Netherlands) Jasper Iwema	5
16	(Germany) Luca Bauer	3
17	(Russia) Ilya Krivonozhko	0

== See also ==
- 2021 Ice Speedway of Nations
