= Franz Zorn =

Austrian ice speedway rider (born 1970)

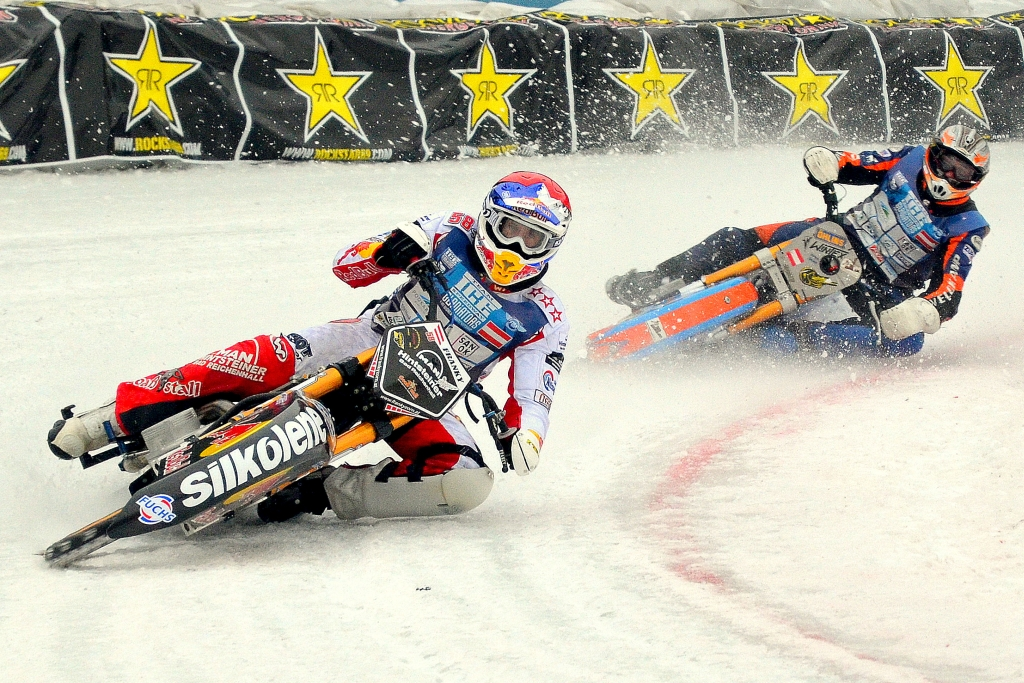
- Franz Zorn leads Harald Simon
- Born: August 30, 1970 (age 56); Saalfelden, Austria
- Nationality: Austrian

Individual honours
- 2000, 2023: World Championship silver medal
- 2008, 2009: World Championship bronze medal
- 2008, 2023: European Champion

Team honours
- 8 x silver, 6 x bronze: Ice Speedway of Nations

Franz Zorn (born 30 August 1970 in Saalfelden, Austria) is an Austrian ice speedway rider.

== Career ==
In 2000, Zorn finished runner up in the 2000 Individual Ice Speedway World Championship. In 2008, he who won the Individual Ice Racing European Championship and two bronze medals in the World Championship in 2008 and 2009. He was part of the Austrian team that won eight silver medals and six bronze medals in the Team Ice Racing World Championship from 1999 to 2019.

In 2023, Zorn finished runner up to Martin Haarahiltunen in the 2023 Individual Ice Racing World Championship. It was the second time that he had won the silver medal, the first was over 20 years earlier in 2000. He also won a second European Championship in 2023.

== Major results ==
=== Individual World Championship (Ice Racing Grand Prix) ===
- 1998 - 16th
- 1999 - 7th
- 2000 - Runner-up
- 2001 - 4th
- 2002 - 10th
- 2003 - 15th
- 2004 - 14th
- 2005 - 8th
- 2006 - 5th
- 2007 - 5th
- 2008 - bronze medal
- 2009 - bronze medal
- 2010 - 6th
- 2011 - 10th
- 2012 - 9th
- 2013 - 6th
- 2015 - 6th
- 2016 - 6th
- 2017 - 6th
- 2018 - 6th
- 2019 - 15th
- 2020 - 10th
- 2021 - 7th
- 2022 - 21st
- 2023 - Runner-up

=== Team World Championship ===
- 1998 - 4th
- 1999 - bronze medal
- 2000 - 4th
- 2001 - silver medal
- 2002 - ?
- 2003 - ?
- 2004 - bronze medal
- 2005 - ?
- 2006 - ?
- 2007 - ?
- 2008 - silver medal
- 2009 - silver medal
- 2010 - bronze medal
- 2011 - silver medal
- 2012 - silver medal
- 2013 - silver medal
- 2015 - silver medal
- 2016 - bronze medal
- 2017 - silver medal
- 2018 - bronze medal
- 2019 - bronze medal
- 2020 - 4th

=== Individual European Championship ===
- 2008 - European Champion
- 2023 - European Champion

== See also ==
- Austria national speedway team
