= 2003 Individual Ice Speedway World Championship =

Motorcycle ice speedway race

Seasons
- ← 2002 2004 →

The 2003 Individual Ice Speedway World Championship was the 38th edition of the World Championship The Championship was held as a Grand Prix series over six rounds.

== Classification ==
Pos	Rider	Pts
1	(Russia) Vitaly Khomitsevich	
2	(Germany) Günter Bauer	
3	(Russia) Vladimir Lumpov	
4	(Russia) Alexander Balashov	
5	(Finland) Antti Aakko	
6	(Russia) Juri Polikarpov	
7	(Russia) Maxim Sachorow	
8	(Russia) Nikolay Krasnikov	
9	(Sweden) Per-Olof Serenius	
10	(Russia) Iwan Iwanov	
11	(Russia) Junir Baseew	
12	(Czech Republic) Antonin Klatovsky	
13	(Russia) Kirilł Drogalin	
14	(Russia) Vjatjeslav Nikulin	
15	(Austria) Franz Zorn	
16	(Sweden) Stefan Svensson	
17	(Netherlands) Johnny Tunistra	
18	(Finland) Raimo Henriksson	
19	(Austria) Harald Simon	

== See also ==
- 2003 Speedway Grand Prix in classic speedway
- 2003 Team Ice Racing World Championship
