= 2022 Individual Ice Racing World Championship =

Ice speedway event

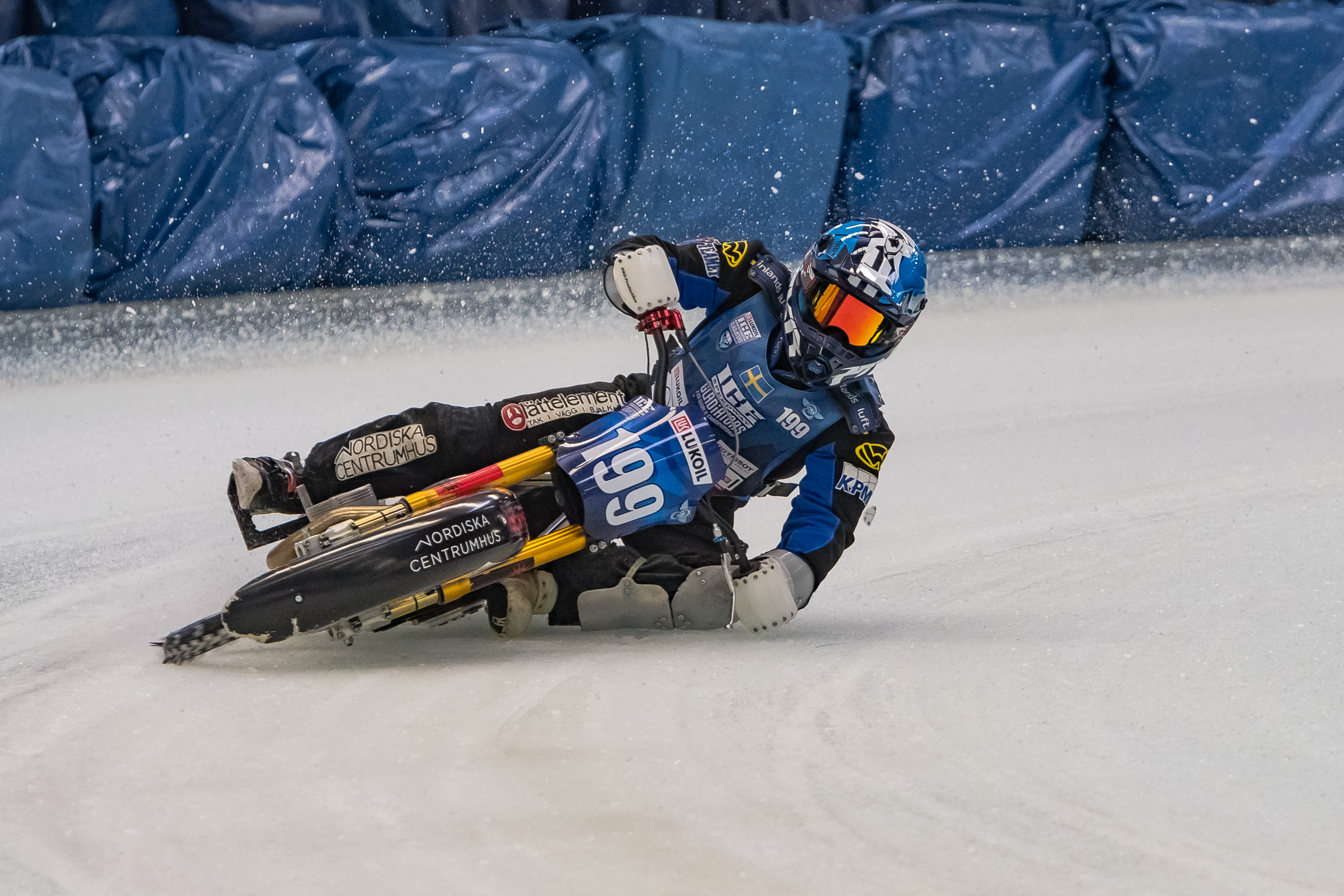
- Martin Haarahiltunen won the world title in the absence of the Russian riders.

The 2022 FIM Ice Speedway World Championship was the 56th edition of the FIM Individual Ice Racing World Championship season.

Martin Haarahiltunen of Sweden won the World Championship series to become world champion for the first time and the first Swedish rider to win individual gold in twenty years. He won the title by virtue of overtaking the championship leader and strong favourite Johann Weber in the final round. Haarahiltunen completed a six race maximum while Weber crashed and was injured.

The leading Russian riders competed in the first two rounds but were then banned following the Fédération Internationale de Motocyclisme restrictions imposed on Russian and Belarusian motorcycle riders, teams, officials, and competitions as a result of the 2022 Russian invasion of Ukraine.

In the first two rounds Russian athletes competed as a neutral competitors using the designation MFR (Motorcycle Federation of Russia), as the Court of Arbitration for Sport upheld a ban on Russia competing at World Championships. The ban was implemented by the World Anti-Doping Agency in response to state-sponsored doping program of Russian athletes.

== Final Series ==
	Venue	Date	Winners	Report
1	(Russia) Tolyatti	12 February	Nikita Bogdanov	
2	(Russia) Tolyatti	13 February	Nikita Bogdanov	
3	(Netherlands) Heerenveen	2 April	(Sweden) Martin Haarahiltunen	
4	(Netherlands) Heerenveen	3 April	(Sweden) Martin Haarahiltunen	

== Classification ==
Pos	Rider	Pts
1	(Sweden) Martin Haarahiltunen	54
2	(Germany) Johann Weber	51
3	Nikita Bogdanov	40
4	(Czech Republic) Lukáš Hutla	37
5	(Austria) Harald Simon	34
6	Igor Kononov	34
7	(Netherlands) Jasper Iwema	31
8	Dmitry Koltakov	30
9	Dmitry Khomitsevich	30
10	(Germany) Luca Bauer	26
11	(Sweden) Jimmy Hörnell	22
12	Dinar Valeev	22
13	(Germany) Franz Mayerbüchler	21
14	(Finland) Max Koivula	20
15	(Sweden) Ove Ledström	20
16	Ivan Khuzhin	20
17	(Sweden) Joakim Söderström	18
18	(Czech Republic) Andrej Diviš	16
19	Igor Saidullin	13
20	(Norway) Jo Sætre	9
21	(Austria) Franz Zorn	9
22	(Finland) Aki Ala-Riihimäki	8
23	Nikita Toloknov	6
24	(Finland) Henri Ahlbom	5
25	(Czech Republic) Jiří Wildt	4
26	(Germany) Benedikt Monn	2
27	(Netherlands) Niek Schaap	2

== See also ==
- 2022 Ice Speedway of Nations
