= 2018 Individual Ice Racing World Championship =

Motorcycle ice speedway race

The 2018 FIM Ice Speedway World Championship was the 53rd edition of FIM Individual Ice Racing World Championship season. The world champion was determined by ten races hosted in five cities Astana, Tolyatti, Berlin, Inzell and Heerenveen between 3 February and 8 April 2018. The Championships were sponsored by Lukoil.

Dmitry Koltakov of Russia was dominant throughout the World Championship series, winning nine of the ten rounds. This was Koltakov's third World title.

== Final Series ==
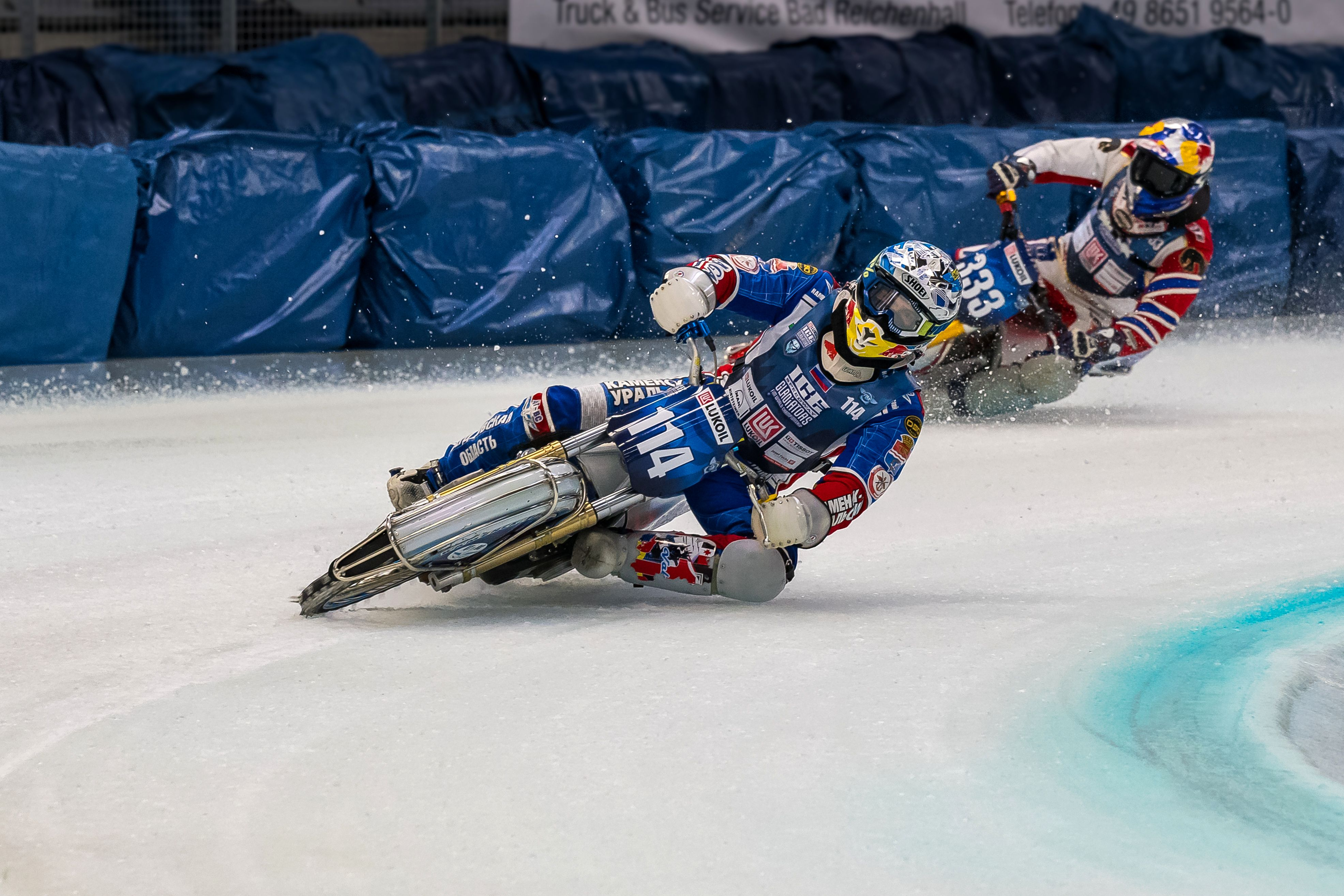
Two competitors during Final 4 of the 2018 FIM Ice Speedway World Gladiator Championship in Inzell, Germany (March 16, 2018)

	Venue	Date	Winners
1	(Kazakhstan) Astana	3 February	(Russia) Dmitry Koltakov
2	(Kazakhstan) Astana	4 February	(Russia) Dmitry Koltakov
3	(Russia) Tolyatti	8 February	(Russia) Dmitry Koltakov
4	(Russia) Tolyatti	9 February	(Russia) Dmitry Khomitsevich
5	(Germany) Berlin	3 March	(Russia) Dmitry Koltakov
6	(Germany) Berlin	4 March	(Russia) Dmitry Koltakov
7	(Germany) Inzell	17 March	(Russia) Dmitry Koltakov
8	(Germany) Inzell	18 March	(Russia) Dmitry Koltakov
9	(Netherlands) Heerenveen	7 April	(Russia) Dmitry Koltakov
10	(Netherlands) Heerenveen	8 April	(Russia) Dmitry Koltakov

== Classification ==
Pos	Rider	Pts
1	(Russia) Dmitry Koltakov	202
2	(Russia) Daniil Ivanov	167
3	(Russia) Dmitry Khomitsevich	154
4	(Sweden) Martin Haarahiltunen	115
5	(Russia) Dinar Valeev	98
6	(Austria) Franz Zorn	76
7	(Austria) Harald Simon	75
8	(Russia) Sergey Karachintsev	68
9	(Sweden) Niclas Svensson	60
10	(Sweden) Jimmy Olsen	58
11	(Czech Republic) Jan Klatovsky	47
12	(Sweden) Stefan Svensson	44
13	(Sweden) Ove Ledström	44
14	(Germany) Johann Weber	39
15	(Netherlands) Jasper Iwema	23
16	(Russia) Igor Kononov	22
17	(Kazakhstan) Andrey Shishegov	17
18	(Germany) Günther Bauer	15
19	(Germany) Stefan Pletschacher	11
20	(Germany) Max Niedermaier	10

== See also ==
- 2018 Team Ice Racing World Championship
