= 2004 Individual Ice Speedway World Championship =

Motorcycle ice speedway race

Seasons
- ← 2003 2005 →

The 2004 Individual Ice Speedway World Championship was the 39th edition of the World Championship The Championship was held as a Grand Prix series over eight rounds. The title was won by Dmitry Bulankin

== Classification ==
| Pos | Rider | Pts |
|---|---|---|
| 1 | (Russia) Dmitry Bulankin | |
| 2 | (Russia) Vitaly Khomitsevich | |
| 3 | (Russia) Nikolay Krasnikov | |
| 4 | (Russia) Iwan Iwanov | |
| 5 | (Russia) Vladimir Lumpov | |
| 6 | (Finland) Antti Aakko | |
| 7 | (Germany) Günter Bauer | |
| 8 | (Russia) Junir Baseew | |
| 9 | (Sweden) Per-Olof Serenius | |
| 10 | (Russia) Juri Polikarpov | |
| 11 | (Russia) Kirilł Drogalin | |
| 12 | (Czech Republic) Antonin Klatovsky | |
| 13 | (Germany) Robert Eibl | |
| 14 | (Austria) Franz Zorn | |
| 15 | (Sweden) Stefan Svensson | |
| 16 | (Germany) Stephan Pletschacher | |
| 17 | (Russia) Max Sachorow | |
| 18 | (Austria) Markus Skabraut | |
| 19 | (Netherlands) Johnny Tunistra | |

== See also ==
- 2004 Speedway Grand Prix in classic speedway
- 2004 Team Ice Racing World Championship
