= 1998 Individual Ice Speedway World Championship =

Motorcycle ice speedway race

Seasons
- ← 1997 1999 →

The 1998 Individual Ice Speedway World Championship was the 33rd edition of the World Championship The Championship was held as a Grand Prix series over ten rounds.

Alexander Balashov of Russia won his third World title.

== Classification ==
Pos	Rider	Pts
1	(Russia) Alexander Balashov	
2	(Russia) Kirilł Drogalin	
3	(Russia) Vyacheslav Nikulin	
4	(Russia) Vladimir Lumpov	
5	(Sweden) Per-Olof Serenius	
6	(Sweden) Stefan Svensson	
7	(Russia) Vladimir Fadeev	
8	(Russia) Juri Polikarpov	
9	(Belarus) Igor Jakowlev	
10	(Belarus) Oleg Chomitsch	
11	(Czech Republic) Antonin Klatovsky	
12	(Finland) Jari Ahlbom	
13	(Netherlands) Tjitte Bootsma	
14	(Finland) Aki-Ala Rihimäki	
15	(Sweden) Lars-Olof Jansson	
16	(Austria) Franz Zorn	
17	(Sweden) Ola Westlund	
18	(Finland) Antti Aakko	

== See also ==
- 1998 Speedway Grand Prix in classic speedway
- 1998 Team Ice Racing World Championship
