= 2017 Individual Ice Racing World Championship =

Motorcycle ice speedway race

The 2017 FIM Ice Speedway Gladiators World Championship was the 2017 version of FIM Individual Ice Racing World Championship season. The world champion was determined by ten races hosted in five cities Tolyatti, Shadrinsk, Almaty, Berlin and Heerenveen between 7 January and 2 April 2017.

== Final Series ==
	Venue	Winners
1	(Russia) Tolyatti	(Russia) Dmitry Koltakov
2	(Russia) Tolyatti	(Russia) Dmitry Khomitsevich
3	(Russia) Shadrinsk	(Russia) Igor Kononov
4	(Russia) Shadrinsk	(Russia) Igor Kononov
5	(Kazakhstan) Almaty	(Russia) Igor Kononov
6	(Kazakhstan) Almaty	(Russia) Igor Kononov
7	(Germany) Berlin	(Russia) Dmitry Koltakov
8	(Germany) Berlin	(Russia) Dmitry Koltakov
9	(Netherlands) Heerenveen	(Russia) Dmitry Koltakov
10	(Netherlands) Heerenveen	(Russia) Dmitry Khomitsevich

== Classification ==
Pos	Rider	Pts
1	(Russia) Dmitry Koltakov	185
2	(Russia) Igor Kononov	170
3	(Russia) Dmitry Khomitsevich	154
4	(Russia) Dinar Valeev	135
5	(Russia) Daniil Ivanov	106
6	(Austria) Franz Zorn	104
7	(Sweden) Stefan Svensson	78
8	(Germany) Günther Bauer	66
9	(Austria) Harald Simon	53
10	(Sweden) Niclas Svensson	49
11	(Sweden) Ove Ledström	47
12	(Germany) Max Niedermaier	43
13	(Czech Republic) Jan Klatovsky	34
14	(Germany) Hans Weber	29
15	(Russia) Nikolay Krasnikov	28
16	(Sweden) Jimmy Olsen	20
17	(Russia) Nikita Toloknov	19
18	(Finland) Timo Kankunen	10
19	(Kazakhstan) Vladimir Cheblakov	7
20	(Russia) Artem Akulov	6
21	(Kazakhstan) Pavel Nekrassov	5

== See also ==
- 2017 Team Ice Racing World Championship
- 2017 Speedway Grand Prix in classic speedway
