= 2006 Individual Ice Speedway World Championship =

Motorcycle ice speedway race

Seasons
- ← 2005 2007 →

The 2006 Individual Ice Speedway World Championship was the 41st edition of the World Championship The Championship was held as a Grand Prix series over four rounds.

== Classification ==
Pos	Rider	Pts
1	(Russia) Nikolay Krasnikov	
2	(Russia) Junir Bazeev	
3	(Russia) Mikhail Bogdanov	
4	(Russia) Vladimir Lumpov	
5	(Austria) Franz Zorn	
6	(Russia) Ilya Drozdov	
7	(Russia) Maksim Zakharov	
8	(Finland) Antti Aakko	
9	(Sweden) Stefan Svensson	
10	(Russia) Dmitry Bulankin	
11	(Russia) Andrej Shishegov	
12	(Sweden) Per-Olof Serenius	
13	(Czech Republic) Antonín Klatovský	
14	(Russia) Vyacheslav Nikulin	
15	(Austria) Harald Simon	
16	(Finland) Tommy Flyktman	
17	(Germany) Robert Eibl	
18	(Netherlands) Johnny Tuinstra	

== See also ==
- 2006 Speedway Grand Prix in classic speedway
- 2006 Team Ice Racing World Championship
