= 2007 Individual Ice Speedway World Championship =

Motorcycle ice speedway race

The 2007 Individual Ice Speedway World Championship was the 42nd edition of the World Championship The Championship was held as a Grand Prix series over six rounds.

== Classification ==
Pos	Rider	Pts
1	(Russia) Nikolay Krasnikov	
2	(Russia) Vitaly Khomitsevich	
3	(Russia) Iwan Iwanov	
4	(Russia) Mikhail Bogdanow	
5	(Austria) Franz Zorn	
6	(Russia) Daniil Ivanov	
7	(Russia) Dmitry Bulankin	
8	(Sweden) Stefan Svensson	
9	(Russia) Sergei Baltaschew	
10	(Finland) Antti Aakko	
11	(Austria) Harald Simon	
12	(Germany) Günter Bauer	
13	(Austria) Markus Skabraut	
14	(Czech Republic) Antonin Klatovsky	
15	(Russia) Stanislaw Arkhipov	
16	(Netherlands) Johnny Tunistra	
17	(Sweden) Per-Olof Serenius	
18	(Germany) Max Niedermaier Jr	

== See also ==
- 2007 Speedway Grand Prix in classic speedway
- 2007 Team Ice Racing World Championship
