= 2020 Individual Ice Racing World Championship =

Ice racing championship season

The 2020 FIM Ice Speedway World Championship was the 55th edition of the FIM Individual Ice Racing World Championship season. The world champion was determined by ten races hosted in five cities Almata, Tolyatti, Shadrinsk, Inzell and Heerenveen between 1 February and 8 April 2020. However the fourth and fifth rounds were cancelled due to the COVID-19 pandemic and the standings after three rounds were declared the official results.

Daniil Ivanov won the reduced World Championship series to become world champion for the fourth time.

== Final Series ==
	Venue	Date	Winners
1	(Kazakhstan) Almaty	1 February	(Russia) Daniil Ivanov
2	(Kazakhstan) Almaty	2 February	(Russia) Daniil Ivanov
3	(Russia) Tolyatti	8 February	(Russia) Daniil Ivanov
4	(Russia) Tolyatti	9 February	(Russia) Dinar Valeev
5	(Russia) Shadrinsk	15 February	(Russia) Dmitry Khomitsevich
6	(Russia) Shadrinsk	16 February	(Russia) Igor Kononov
7	(Germany) Inzell	14 March	cancelled due to COVID-19 pandemic
8	(Germany) Inzell	15 March	cancelled due to COVID-19 pandemic
9	(Netherlands) Heerenveen	7 April	cancelled due to COVID-19 pandemic
10	(Netherlands) Heerenveen	8 April	cancelled due to COVID-19 pandemic

== Classification ==
Pos	Rider	Pts
1	(Russia) Daniil Ivanov	104
2	(Russia) Dmitry Khomitsevich	100
3	(Russia) Dinar Valeev	95
4	(Russia) Igor Kononov	86
5	(Russia) Dmitry Koltakov	79
6	(Austria) Harald Simon	58
7	(Germany) Johann Weber	56
8	(Sweden) Martin Haarahiltunen	53
9	(Sweden) Stefan Svensson	37
10	(Austria) Franz Zorn	36
11	(Sweden) Niclas Svensson	33
12	(Sweden) Ove Ledström	31
13	(Russia) Konstantin Kolenkin	22
14	(Russia) Evgeniy Saydullin	21
15	(Austria) Charly Ebner	18
16	(Czech Republic) Lukas Hutla	18
17	(Netherlands) Jasper Iwema	16
18	(Netherlands) Bart Schaap	6

== See also ==
- 2020 Ice Speedway of Nations
