= 1999 Individual Ice Speedway World Championship =

Motorcycle ice speedway race

Seasons
- ← 1998 2000 →

The 1999 Individual Ice Speedway World Championship was the 34th edition of the World Championship The Championship was held as a Grand Prix series over ten rounds.

== Classification ==
Pos	Rider	Pts
1	(Russia) Vladimir Fadeev	
2	(Russia) Alexander Balashov	
3	(Russia) Vyacheslav Nikulin	
4	(Sweden) Stefan Svensson	
5	(Russia) Kirilł Drogalin	
6	(Russia) Valeri Perzew	
7	(Austria) Franz Zorn	
8	(Russia) Vladimir Lumpov	
9	(Finland) Aki-Ala Rihimäki	
10	(Sweden) Per-Olof Serenius	
11	(Netherlands) Tjitte Bootsma	
12	(Russia) Juri Polikarpov	
13	(Germany) Günter Bauer	
14	(Czech Republic) Antonin Klatovsky	
15	(Germany) Jürgen Liebmahn	
16	(Finland) Jari Ahlbom	
17	(Sweden) Erik Rydberg	
18	(Germany) Markus Schwaiger	
19	(Netherlands) Gerrit Rook	

== See also ==
- 1999 Speedway Grand Prix in classic speedway
- 1999 Team Ice Racing World Championship
