= 2002 Team Ice Racing World Championship =

Ice speedway event

Ice Speedway of Nations
- Location: Krasnogorsk, Russia
- Start date: 2002
- End date: 2002

The 2002 Team Ice Racing World Championship was the 24th edition of the Team World Championship. The final was held on ?, 2002, in Krasnogorsk, in Russia.

Sweden won their third title and a European team finished in the bronze medal position.

== Final Classification ==
Pos	Riders	Pts
1	(Sweden) Per-Olof Serenius, Stefan Svensson, Ola Westlund	56
2	(Russia) Vladimir Fadeev, Kirilł Drogalin, Juri Polikarpov	49
3	(European Union) Andrej Jakovlev, Antonin Klatovsky Jr., Raimo Henndrikkson	45
4	(Germany) Günther Bauer, Jürgen Liebmann, Stefan Pletschacher	40
5	(Netherlands) Tjitte Bootsma, Johnny Tuinstra	25
6	(Finland) Antti Aakko, Aki-Ala Riihimäki, Jari Moisio	25
7	(Austria) Markus Skabraut, Harald Simon, Josef Böhm	22

== See also ==
- 2002 Individual Ice Speedway World Championship
- 2002 Speedway World Cup in classic speedway
- 2002 Speedway Grand Prix in classic speedway
