= 2019 Ice Speedway of Nations =

Ice Speedway of Nations
- Venue: Tolyatti, Russia
- Start date: 16 February
- End date: 17 February
- Nations: 7

The 2019 Ice Speedway of Nations was the 41st edition of the FIM's Ice Speedway World Championship for national teams and the first in its re-branding as the Ice Speedway of Nations. The event was held at the Anatoly Stepanov Stadium in Togliatti, Russia.

Russia won their 17th consecutive world title and also won the title for the 37th time (including Soviet Union) during the 41 years that the championships have been held.

== Final Classification ==
Pos	Riders	Pts
1	(Russia) Daniil Ivanov 23, Dmitry Koltakov 20, Dmitry Khomitsevich 17	60+13
2	(Sweden) Martin Haarahiltunen 16, Ove Ledstrom 17, Niclas Svensson 19	52+2
3	(Austria) Franz Zorn 23, Charly Ebner Jr 12, Josef Kreuzberger 3	38
4	(Germany) Max Niedermaier 21, Stefan Pletschacher 7, Hans Weber 6	34
5	(Finland) Tomi Tani 10, Matti Isoaho 14, Jussi Nyronen 0	24
6	(Kazakhstan) Sergey Serov 1, Vladimir Cheblokov 15, Denis Slepukhin 6	22
7	(Czech Republic) Andrej Divis 14, Jan Klaus 4, Lukas Volejnik 3	21

== See also ==
- Ice racing
- Ice Speedway of Nations
- Individual Ice Speedway World Championship
