= 2023 Individual Ice Speedway World Championship =

Ice speedway event

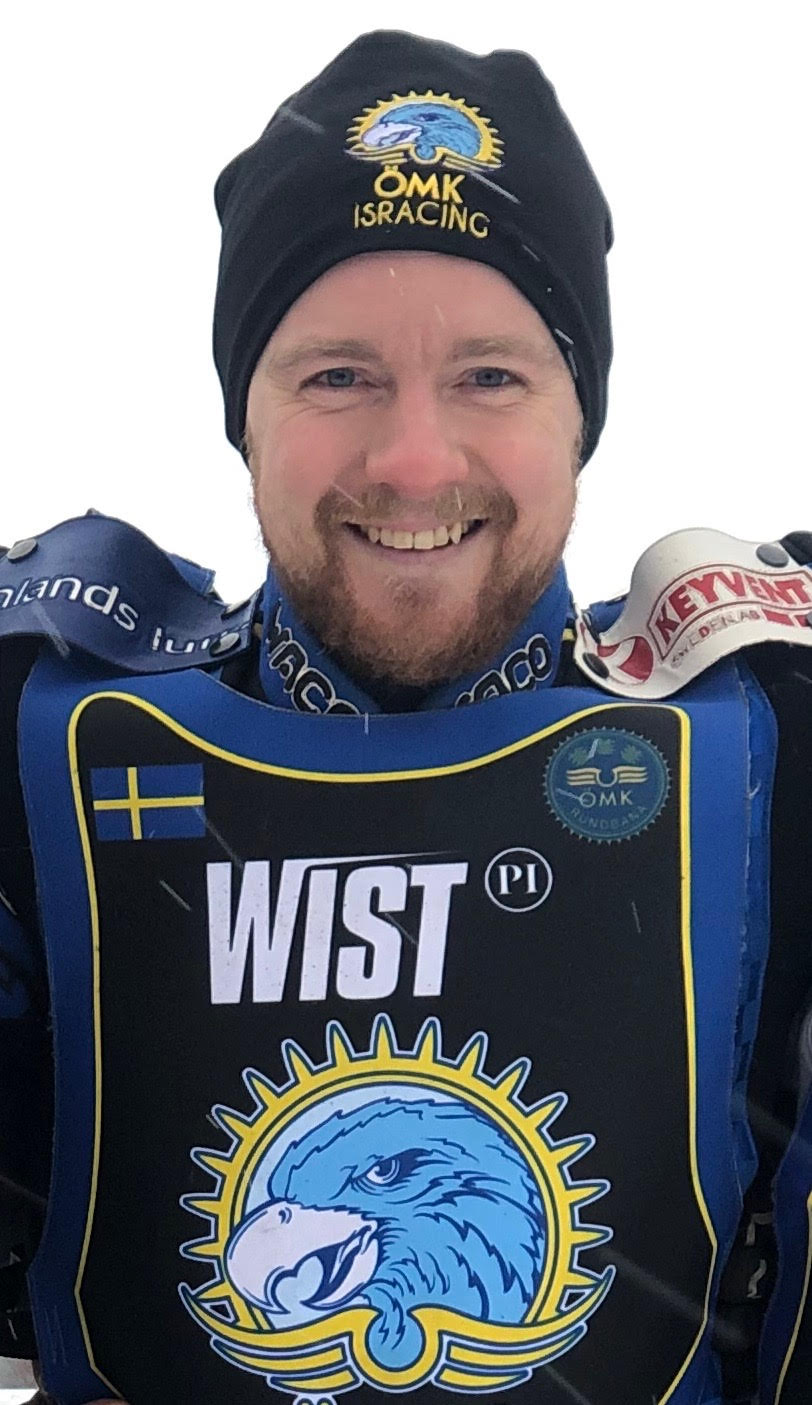
- Martin Haarahiltunen retained his world title.

The 2023 FIM Ice Speedway World Championship was the 57th edition of the FIM Individual Ice Racing World Championship season.

Martin Haarahiltunen of Sweden retained the World Championship series that he had won in 2022.

The leading Russian riders who received bans during the previous year's competition remained banned. The ban related to the Fédération Internationale de Motocyclisme restrictions imposed on Russian and Belarusian motorcycle riders, teams, officials, and competitions as a result of the 2022 Russian invasion of Ukraine.

== Final Series ==
	Venue	Date	Winners
1	(Germany) Inzell	18 March	(Sweden) Martin Haarahiltunen
2	(Germany) Inzell	19 March	(Sweden) Martin Haarahiltunen

== Classification ==
Pos	Rider	Pts	Pts	Total
1	(Sweden) Martin Haarahiltunen	20	20	40
2	(Austria) Franz Zorn	14	18	32
3	(Austria) Harald Simon	16	16	32
4	(Germany) Luca Bauer	18	12	30
5	(Sweden) Niclas Svensson	10	14	24
6	(Germany) Markus Jell	11	11	22
7	(Sweden) Stefan Svensson	12	9	21
8	(Finland) Mats Järf	9	10	19
9	(Sweden) Jimmy Olsen	8	7	15
10	(Norway) Jo Saetre	7	6	13
11	(Finland) Max Koivula	4	8	12
12	(Czech Republic) Andrej Diviš	6	3	9
13	(Czech Republic) Lukáš Hutla	5	4	9
14	(Germany) Benedikt Monn	1	5	6
15	(Germany) Franz Mayerbüchler	2	2	4
16	(Germany) Johann Weber	3	-	3
17	(Netherlands) Sebastian Reitsma	0	1	1
18	(Germany) Max Niedermaier	0	dnr	0
