= 2008 Individual Ice Racing World Championship =

Motorcycle ice speedway race

2008 Individual Ice Speedway World Championship

The 2008 FIM Ice Speedway World Championship was the 2008 version of FIM Individual Ice Racing World Championship season. The world champion was determined by six races hosted in three cities.

== Classification ==
Pos	Rider	Pts
1	(Russia) Nikolay Krasnikov	124
2	(Russia) Dmitry Khomitsevich	117
3	(Austria) Franz Zorn	104
4	(Russia) Daniil Ivanov	104
5	(Russia) Stanislav Arkhipov	94
6	(Russia) Maxim Sakharov	83
7	(Russia) Ilja Drozdov	63
8	(Russia) Pavel Chaika	60
9	(Austria) Harald Simon	50
10	(Sweden) Per-Olof Serenius	49

== See also ==
- 2008 Team Ice Racing World Championship
- 2008 Speedway Grand Prix in classic speedway
