= 2001 Team Ice Racing World Championship =

Ice speedway event

Ice Speedway of Nations
- Location: Berlin, Germany
- Start date: 2001
- End date: 2001

The 2001 Team Ice Racing World Championship was the 23rd edition of the Team World Championship. The final was held on ?, 2001, in Berlin, Germany.

Russia won the title.

== Final classification ==
| Pos | Riders | Pts |
|---|---|---|
| 1 | (Russia) Vladimir Fadeev, Kirilł Drogalin, Juri Polikarpov | 76 |
| 2 | (Austria) Franz Zorn, Josef Böhm, Markus Skabraut | 48 |
| 3 | (Germany) Günther Bauer, Jürgen Liebmann, Stefan Pletschacher | 48 |
| 4 | (Sweden) Ola Westlund, Kent Peltonen, Per-Olof Serenius, Stefan Svensson | 42 |
| 5 | (Finland) Jari Ahlbom, Raimo Henriksson, Rikko Rantanen, Antti Aakko | 26 |

== See also ==
- 2001 Individual Ice Speedway World Championship
- 2001 Speedway World Cup in classic speedway
- 2001 Speedway Grand Prix in classic speedway
