= 2024 Individual Ice Speedway World Championship =

Ice speedway event

The 2024 FIM Ice Speedway World Championship was the 58th edition of the Individual Ice Speedway World Championship, organised by the FIM.

Martin Haarahiltunen of Sweden won the World Championship series for the third consecutive year.

The leading Russian riders remained banned. The ban related to the Fédération Internationale de Motocyclisme restrictions imposed on Russian and Belarusian motorcycle riders, teams, officials, and competitions as a result of the 2022 Russian invasion of Ukraine.

== Final series ==
	Venue	Date	Winners
1	(Germany) Max Aicher Arena, Inzell	23 March	(Germany) Max Niedermaier
2	(Germany) Max Aicher Arena, Inzell	24 March	(Finland) Aki Ala-Riihimäki
3	(Netherlands) Thialf Ice Stadium, Heerenveen	6 April	(Sweden) Martin Haarahiltunen
4	(Netherlands) Thialf Ice Stadium, Heerenveen	7 April	(Sweden) Stefan Svensson

== Final classification ==
Pos	Rider	Pts	Pts	Pts	Pts	Total
1	(Sweden) Martin Haarahiltunen	18	18	20	14	70
2	(Germany) Max Niedermaier	20	14	18	11	63
3	(Finland) Heikki Huusko	16	16	10	16	58
4	(Finland) Aki Ala-Riihimäki	14	20	14	5	53
5	(Sweden) Stefan Svensson	10	11	12	20	53
6	(Sweden) Jimmy Olsen	5	8	16	18	47
7	(Finland) Max Koivula	8	10	11	12	41
8	(Austria) Franz Zorn	9	12	8	10	39
9	(Germany) Markus Jell	11	9	7	3	30
10	(Sweden) Jimmy Hörnell Lidfalk	12	6	1	9	28
11	(Austria) Charly Ebner	6	3	4	8	21
12	(Netherlands) Jasper Iwema	4	7	3	7	21
13	(Czech Republic) Andrej Diviš	3	5	5	6	19
14	(Netherlands) Sebastian Reitsma	-	-	6	4	10
15	(Czech Republic) Lukáš Hutla	-	-	9	-	9
16	(Germany) Johann Weber	7	-	-	-	7
17	(Netherlands) Christoph Kirchner	0	4	-	-	4
18	(Sweden) Filip Jäger	-	-	2	2	4
19	(Germany) Benedikt Monn	2	1	0	-	3
20	(Germany) Franz Mayerbüchler	1	2	-	-	3
