= 2000 Individual Ice Speedway World Championship =

Motorcycle ice speedway race

Seasons
- ← 1999 2001 →

The 2000 Individual Ice Speedway World Championship was the 35th edition of the World Championship The final was held on 11/12 March, 2000 in Assen in the Netherlands.

Kirilł Drogalin won his second world title.

== Final ==
- March 11–12
- NED Assen

| Pos. | Rider | Points | Details |
|---|---|---|---|
| 1 | (Russia) Kirilł Drogalin | 26 | |
| 2 | (Austria) Franz Zorn | 25 | |
| 3 | (Russia) Vladimir Fadeev | 24 | |
| 4 | (Russia) Alexander Balashov | 18 | |
| 5 | (Russia) Aleksandr Moskovka | 18 | |
| 6 | (Russia) Yuri Polikarpov | 17 | |
| 7 | (Russia) Vladimir Lumpov | 16 | |
| 8 | (Germany) Vyacheslav Nikulin | 14 | |
| 9 | (Finland) Aki Ala-Rihiimäki | 14 | |
| 10 | (Russia) Valery Pertsev | 14 | |
| 11 | (Sweden) Per-Olof Serenius | 14 | |
| 12 | (Belarus) Igor Yakovlev | 13 | |
| 13 | (Germany) Günther Bauer | 7 | |
| 14 | (Netherlands) Tjitte Bootsma | 7 | |
| 15 | (Germany) Markus Schwaiger | 5 | |
| 16 | (Belarus) Andrey Yakovlev | 4 | |
| 17 | (Russia) Maxim Baraboshkin | 2 | |
| 18 | (Russia) Yuri Ivanov | 2 | |

== See also ==
- 2000 Speedway Grand Prix in classic speedway
