= 1998 Team Ice Racing World Championship =

Seasons
- ← 1997 1999 →

The 1998 Team Ice Racing World Championship was the 20th edition of the Team World Championship. The final was held on ?, 1998, in Gothenburg, in Sweden.

Russia won the title.

== Final Classification ==
| Pos | Riders | Pts |
|---|---|---|
| 1 | (Russia) Vladimir Lumpov 28(13+15), Alexander Balashov 23(11+12), Kirilł Drogalin 2(2+dnr) | 53 |
| 2 | (Sweden) Stefan Svensson 30 (17+13), Per-Olof Serenius 19(9+10), Lars Olov Jansson 0(dnr +0) | 49 |
| 3 | (Finland) Aki Ala Riihimaki 24(9+15), Jari Ahlbom 17(10+7), Antti Aakko 0(0+0) | 41 |
| 4 | (Austria) Franz Zorn 20(11+9), Harald Simon 16(6+10), Josef Böhm dnr) | 36 |
| 5 | (Germany) Gunther Bauer 30(15+15), Thomas Baumgarter 5(1+4), Michael Lang 0(0+dnr) | 35 |
| 6 | (Netherlands) Tjiite Bootsma 11(5+6), Gerrit Rook 8(6+2), Jan De Pruis dnr | 19 |
| 7 | (Czech Republic) Stanislav Dyk 10(5+5), Antonin Klatovsky Jnr 7(5+2), Jiri Petrasek 0(0+0) | 17 |

== See also ==
- 1998 Individual Ice Speedway World Championship
- 1998 Speedway World Team Cup in classic speedway
- 1998 Speedway Grand Prix in classic speedway
