= 2011 Team Ice Racing World Championship =

Ice speedway event

Ice Speedway of Nations
- Location: Berlin Germany
- Start date: 26 February 2011
- End date: 27 February 2011

The 2011 FIM Team Ice Racing World Championship was the 33rd edition and the 2011 version of FIM Team Ice Racing World Championship season. The Final was held in Berlin, Germany on 26–27 February 2011.

The championship was won by the defending champion Russia (58 points), who they beat Austria (49 pts) and Czech Republic (37 pts).

== World Final ==
=== Results ===
- 26–27 February 2011
- (Germany) Wilmersdorf, Berlin
- Horst-Dohm-Eisstadion (Length: 386m)
- Referee: (Hungary) Istvan Darago
- Jury President: (Finland) Ilkka Teromaa
- References

Pos.	National team	Day 1	Day 2	Total points
1	Russia (MFR)	28	30	58
2	Austria (OeAMTC)	27	22	49
3	Czech Republic (ACCR)	19	18	37
4	Sweden (SVEMO)	16	16	32
5	Finland (SML)	10	15	25
6	Netherlands (KNMV)	13	12	25
7	Germany (DMSB)	12	12	24

=== Heat details - Day One ===
Placing	Pair / Rider Name	Total	1	2	3	4	5	6	7	8	9	10	11	12	13	14	15	16	17	18	19	20	21
1	Russia	28							10							20							28
1	(9) Daniil Ivanov	11			3			3				-		3			2*					-
1	(10) Dmitry Khomitsevich	6			2*			-				2*		2*			-					F
1	(19) Nikolay Krasnikov	11						2*				3					3					3
2	Austria	27							10							20							27
2	(5) Harald Simon	10		2*			2*			2*					2*				2*			-
2	(6) Martin Leitner	0		-			-			-					-				-			0
2	(17) Franz Zorn	17		3			3			3					3				3			2
3	Czech Republic	19							4							10							19
3	(11) Antonin Klatovsky	11			0				2				3		X			3					3
3	(12) Jan Klatovsky	8			1				1*				2*		1			1					2*
3	(20) Andrej Divis	0
4	Sweden	16							6							11							16
4	(13) Stefan Svensson	14				3			3			1				3			1		3
4	(14) Per Anders Lindström	0				X			0			-				-			0		-
4	(21) Peter Koij	2										0				1					1
5	Netherlands	13							5							7							13
5	(1) Johnny Tuinstra	4	2			2				-			0				0			-
5	(2) Sven Holstein	5	-			1				1			1				-			2*
5	(15) Rene Stellingwerf	4	0							R							1			3
6	Germany	12							5							8							12
6	(3) Stefan Pletschacher	8	1				1				2			-				2			2
6	(4) Max Niedermaier	4	3				0				0			1				X			0
6	(16) Christoph Kirchner	0												0
7	Finland	10							2							8							10
7	(7) Mats Jarf	7		0				1			3					2				X			1
7	(8) Henri Malinen	0		-				0			-					-				-			-
7	(18) Kai Lehtinen	3		1							1					0				1			0
Placing	Pair / Rider Name	Total	1	2	3	4	5	6	7	8	9	10	11	12	13	14	15	16	17	18	19	20	21

m - exclusion for exceeding two minute time allowance • t - exclusion for touching the tapes • x - other exclusion • e - retired or mechanical failure • f - fell
ns - non-starter • nc - non-classify

gate A - inside	gate B	gate C	gate D - outside

=== Heat details - Day Two ===
Placing	Pair / Rider Name	Points	22	23	24	25	26	27	28	29	30	31	32	33	34	35	36	37	38	39	40	41	42
Total	Day 1	Day 2
1	Russia	58	28	30	10	20	30
(9) Daniil Ivanov	23	11	12	3	-	3	3	-	3
(10) Dmitry Khomitsevich	14	6	8	-	2*	2*	-	2*	2*
(19) Nikolay Krasnikov	21	11	10	2*	3	2*	3
2	Austria	49	27	22	5	14	22
(5) Harald Simon	17	10	7	0	1	1	2*	2*	1*
(6) Martin Leitner	0	0	0	-	-	-	-	-	-
(17) Franz Zorn	32	17	15	1	3	3	3	3	2
3	Czech Republic	37	19	18	9	14	18
(11) Antonin Klatovsky	24	11	13	3	3	2	3	2	0
(12) Jan Klatovsky	8	8	0	F/-	-	-	-	-	-
(20) Andrej Divis	5	-	5	2*	1	0	0	1*	1
4	Sweden	32	16	16	6	10	16
(13) Stefan Svensson	28	14	14	3	2	2	1	3	3
(14) Per Anders Lindström	2	0	2	1	0	1*	0	0	-
(21) Peter Koij	2	2	0	X
7	Finland	25	10	15	5	11	15
(7) Mats Jarf	18	7	11	R	2*	3	2	1	3
(8) Henri Malinen	0	0	0	X	-	-	-	-	-
(18) Kai Lehtinen	7	3	4	3	0	1*	0	0
5	Netherlands	25	13	12	2	6	12
(1) Johnny Tuinstra	4	4	0	0	0	-	-	-	-
(2) Sven Holstein	9	5	4	-	1	1*	0	1*	1*
(15) Rene Stellingwerf	12	4	8	1	2	1	2	2
6	Germany	24	12	12	4	8	12
(3) Stefan Pletschacher	17	8	9	2	2	1	3	1	F
(4) Max Niedermaier	7	4	3	0	0	-	-	-	3
(16) Christoph Kirchner	0	0	0	0	0	0
Placing	Pair / Rider Name	Total	Day 1	Day 2	22	23	24	25	26	27	28	29	30	31	32	33	34	35	36	37	38	39	40	41	42

m - exclusion for exceeding two minute time allowance • t - exclusion for touching the tapes • x - other exclusion • e - retired or mechanical failure • f - fell
ns - non-starter • nc - non-classify

gate A - inside	gate B	gate C	gate D - outside

== See also ==
- 2011 Individual Ice Racing World Championship
- 2011 Speedway World Cup in classic speedway
- 2011 Speedway Grand Prix in classic speedway
