= 2003 Team Ice Racing World Championship =

Ice speedway event

Ice Speedway of Nations
- Location: Saransk, Russia
- Start date: 2003
- End date: 2003

The 2003 Team Ice Racing World Championship was the 25th edition of the Team World Championship. The final was held on ?, 2003, in Saransk, in Russia.

Russia won their ninth title.

== Final Classification ==
Pos	Riders	Pts
1	(Russia) Vitaly Khomitsevich, Vladimir Lumpov, Maxim Zakharov	53
2	(Sweden) Per-Olof Serenius, Stefan Svensson, Ulf Engenström	50
3	(Germany) Günther Bauer, Jürgen Liebmann, Robert Eibl	36
4	(Europe) Sergei Kasakov, Vyacheslav Nikulin, Antonín Klatovský Jr.	35
5	(Austria) Franz Zorn, Markus Skabraut, Harald Simon	34
6	(Finland) Sami Räsänen, Raimo Henriksson, Antti Aakko	25
7	(Netherlands) Johnny Tuinstra, René Verhorf, Tjitte Bootsma	18

== See also ==
- 2003 Individual Ice Speedway World Championship
- 2003 Speedway World Cup in classic speedway
- 2003 Speedway Grand Prix in classic speedway
