= 2004 Team Ice Racing World Championship =

Ice speedway event

Ice Speedway of Nations
- Location: Inzell, Germany
- Start date: 23 January 2004
- End date: 24 January 2004

The 2004 Team Ice Racing World Championship was the 26th edition of the Team World Championship. The final was held from 23 to 24 January 2004, in Inzell, in Germany.

Russia won their tenth title.

== Final Classification ==
Pos	Riders	Pts
1	(Russia) Nikolay Krasnikov 28, Vitaly Khomitsevich 18, Ivan Ivanov 6	52
2	(Germany) Günther Bauer 34, Robert Eibl 9, Markus Schwaiger 2	45
3	(Austria) Franz Zorn 31, Markus Skabraut 12, Harald Simon 2	35
4	(Sweden) Per-Olof Serenius 19, Stefan Svensson 14	33
5	(Czech Republic) Antonín Klatovský Jr. 25, Jan Klatovský 5, Josef Šiška 1	31
6	(Finland) Antti Aakko 25, Raimo Henriksson 3, Seppo Klemettilä 1	29
7	(Netherlands) Tjitte Bootsma 14, Johnny Tuinstra 12	26

== See also ==
- 2004 Individual Ice Speedway World Championship
- 2004 Speedway World Cup in classic speedway
- 2004 Speedway Grand Prix in classic speedway
