= 2008 Team Ice Racing World Championship =

Ice speedway event

Ice Speedway of Nations
- Location: Krasnogorsk, in Russia
- Start date: 15 February 2008
- End date: 16 February 2008

The 2008 Team Ice Racing World Championship was the 30th edition of the Team World Championship. The final was held from 15 to 16 February 2008, in Krasnogorsk, in Russia.

Russia won their 14th title.

== Final Classification ==
Pos	Riders	Pts
1	(Russia) Vitaly Khomitsevich 24, Nikolay Krasnikov 22, Stanislav Arkhipov 10	56
2	(Austria) Franz Zorn 28, Harald Simon 15	43
3	(Finland) Antti Aakko 29, Tommy Flyktman 13, Kai Lehtinen 0	42
4	(Sweden) Per Olof Serenius 21, Stefan Svensson 10, Per Anders Lindstroem 4	35
5	(Czech Republic) Antonin Klatovsky 25, Jan Klatovsky 6	31
6	(Germany) Gunther Bauer 15, Dmitry Tschatschin 11, Andreas Roth 3	29
7	(Switzerland) Simon Gartmann 10, Thomas Cavigelli 3, Lukas Rosti 3	16

== See also ==
- 2008 Individual Ice Racing World Championship
- 2008 Speedway World Cup in classic speedway
- 2008 Speedway Grand Prix in classic speedway
