= 2020 Ice Speedway of Nations =

Ice Speedway World Championship

Ice Speedway of Nations
- Venue: Wilmersdorf, Berlin, Germany
- Start date: 29 February
- End date: 1 March
- Nations: 7

The 2020 Ice Speedway of Nations was the 42nd edition of the FIM's Ice Speedway World Championship for national teams. The event was held in Wilmersdorf, Berlin, Germany.

Russia won their 18th consecutive world title and also won the title for the 38th time (including Soviet Union) during the 42 years that the championships have been held.

== Final Classification ==
Pos	Riders	Pts
1	(Russia) Daniil Ivanov 20, Dmitry Khomitsevich 17, Igor Kononov 16	57
2	(Sweden) Martin Haarahiltunen 23, Niclas Svensson 20, Stefan Svensson 17	47
3	(Germany) Johan Weber 24, Max Niedermaier 16, Markus Jell 5	45
4	(Austria) Harald Simon 23, Charly Ebner Jr 8, Franz Zorn 8	39
5	(Kazakhstan) Pavel Nekrassov 12, Vladimir Cheblokov 11, Denis Slepukhin 3	26
6	(Czech Republic) Jan Klatovsky 10, Lukáš Hutla 9, Andrej Diviš 2	21
7	(Finland) Miko Jetsonen 8, Matti Isoaho 5, Christer Biskop 2	15

== See also ==
- Ice racing
- Ice Speedway of Nations
- Individual Ice Speedway World Championship
