= 2013 Team Ice Racing World Championship =

Ice speedway event

Ice Speedway of Nations
- Location: Sanok, Poland
- Start date: 25 January 2013
- End date: 26 January 2013

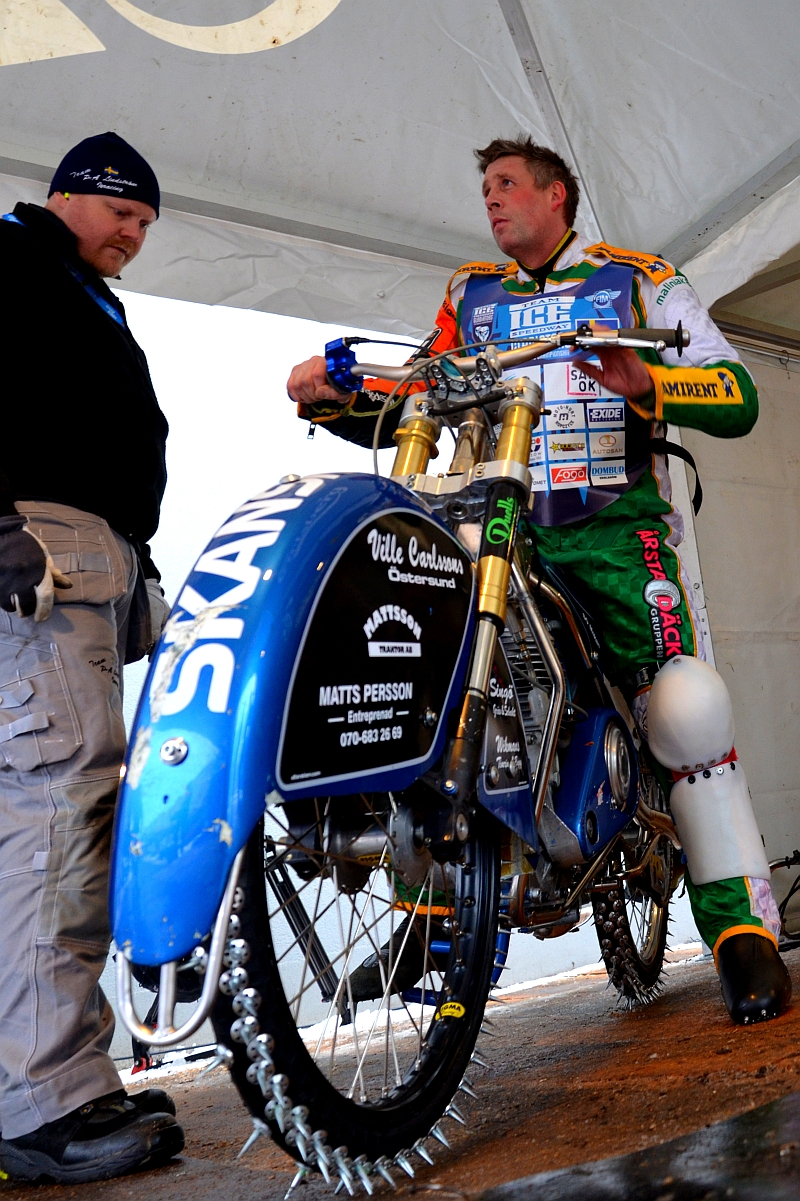
Competitor during the 2013 Team Ice Speedway World Championship Final.

The 2013 Team Ice Racing World Championship was the 35th edition of the Team World Championship. The final was held on 25/26 January, 2013, in Sanok, in Poland.

Russia won their 11th consecutive title and 19th title overall.

Daniil Ivanov defeated Franz Zorn in the run off to determine the world champions after both nations ended with 55 points each.

== Final Classification ==
Pos	Riders	Pts
1	(Russia) Nikolay Krasnikov 13, Dmitry Koltakov 20, Daniil Ivanov 22+3	55+3
2	(Austria) Franz Zorn 28+2, Harald Simon 27, Martin Leitner dnr	55+2
3	(Sweden) Robert Henderson 13, Stefan Svensson 17, Per-Anders Lindström 2	32
4	(Poland) Miroslaw Daniszewski 2, Pawel Strugala 4, Grzegorz Knapp 25	31
5	(Czech Republic) Antonin Klatovsky 7, Jan Klatovsky 24, Jan Pecina 0	31
6	(Germany) Stefan Pletschacher 6, Max Niedermaier 2, Günther Bauer 17	25
7	(Finland) Antti Aakko 18, Janne Vilponen 1, Tomi Tani 3	22

== See also ==
- 2013 Individual Ice Racing World Championship
- 2013 Speedway World Cup in classic speedway
- 2013 Speedway Grand Prix in classic speedway
