= 2014 Team Ice Racing World Championship =

Ice speedway event

Ice Speedway of Nations
- Location: Tolyatti, Russia
- Start date: 8 February 2014
- End date: 9 February 2014

The 2014 Team Ice Racing World Championship was the 36th edition of the Team World Championship. The final was held on 8/9 February, 2014, in Tolyatti, Russia.

Russia won their 12th consecutive title and 20th title overall.

== Final Classification ==
Pos	Riders	Pts
1	(Russia) Daniil Ivanov 20, Dmitry Koltakov 21, Sergej Makarov 17	58
2	(Sweden) Niklas Svensson 3, Stefan Svensson 28, Per-Anders Lindström 12	43
3	(Finland) Antti Aakko 1, Mats Järf 32, Tomi Tani 3	36
4	(Austria) Josef Kreuzberger 7, Harald Simon 26	33
5	(Germany) Stefan Pletschacher 10, Max Niedermaier 1, Günther Bauer 22	33
6	(Czech Republic) Lukas Volejnik 2, Jan Klatovsky 24, Andrej Divis 1	27
7	(Poland) Miroslaw Daniszewski 0, Michal Knapp 3, Grzegorz Knapp 18	21

== See also ==
- 2014 Individual Ice Racing World Championship
- 2014 Speedway World Cup in classic speedway
- 2014 Speedway Grand Prix in classic speedway
