= 2010 Team Ice Racing World Championship =

Ice speedway event

Ice Speedway of Nations
- Location: Krasnogorsk, Moscow Oblast, Russia
- Start date: 30 January 2010
- End date: 31 January 2010

The 2010 FIM Team Ice Racing World Championship was the 32nd edition and the 2010 version of FIM Team Ice Racing World Championship season. The Final was held in Krasnogorsk, Moscow Oblast, Russia on 30–31 January 2010.

The championship was won by Russia (50 points), who they beat Sweden (45 pts) and Austria (41 pts).

== World Final ==
=== Results ===
- (Russia) Krasnogorsk, Moscow Oblast
- 30–31 January 2010
- City stadium "Zorkey" (Length: 400 m.)
- Referee: (Sweden) K. Gardell
- Jury President: (Hungary) J. Nadasdi
- References

Pos.	National team	Day 1	Day 2	Total points
1	Russia	27	23	50
2	Sweden	22	23	45
3	Austria	20	21	41
4	Czech Republic	16	19	35
5	Finland	14	17	31
6	Germany	13	13	26
7	Netherlands	13	10	23

=== Heat details – Day One ===
Placing	Pair / Rider Name	Total	1	2	3	4	5	6	7	8	9	10	11	12	13	14	15	16	17	18	19	20	21
1	Russia	27							9							18							27
1	(9) Dmitry Khomitsevich	6			2			-				1		-			2					1
1	(10) Dmitry Bulankin	6			3			1				-		2			-					-
1	(19) Nikolay Krasnikov	15						3				3		3			3					3
2	Sweden	22							8							18							22
2	(5) Stefan Svensson	10		2			3			-					3				T			2
2	(6) Per-Olof Serenius	9		-			2			3					2				2			0
2	(17) Per-Anders Lindström	3		1						2
3	Austria	20							5							12							20
3	(7) Harald Simon	0		0				0			0					-				-			-
3	(8) Martin Leitner	3		-				-			-					1				1			1
3	(18) Franz Zorn	17		3				2			3					3				3			3
4	Czech Republic	16							6							9							16
4	(3) Antonín Klatovský, Jr.	12	3				1				2			Fx				3			3
4	(4) Jan Klatovský	4	2				0				1			R				0			1
4	(16) Andrej Diviš	0
5	Finland	14							4							8							14
5	(13) Antti Aakko	12				R			3			2				2			3		2
5	(14) Kai Lehtinen	2				1			-			0				0			1		-
5	(21) Mats Järf	0							R												0
6	Germany	13							6							10							13
6	(1) Stefan Pletschacher	4	0			2				0			0				-			2
6	(2) Max Niedermaier	9	1			3				1			3				1			0
6	(15) Johann Weber	0															Fx
7	Netherlands	13							4							8							13
7	(11) René Stellingwerf	5			0				2				2		0			1					0
7	(12) Sven Holstein	8			1				1				1		1			2					2
7	(20) René Verhoef	0
Placing	Pair / Rider Name	Total	1	2	3	4	5	6	7	8	9	10	11	12	13	14	15	16	17	18	19	20	21

m - exclusion for exceeding two minute time allowance • t - exclusion for touching the tapes • x - other exclusion • e - retired or mechanical failure • f - fell
ns - non-starter • nc - non-classify

gate A - inside	gate B	gate C	gate D - outside

=== Heat details – Day Two ===
Placing	Pair / Rider Name	Points	22	23	24	25	26	27	28	29	30	31	32	33	34	35	36	37	38	39	40	41	42
Total	Day 1	Day 2
1	Russia	50	27	23	9	15	23
(9) Dmitry Khomitsevich	14	6	8	1	2	3	-	0	2
(10) Dmitry Bulankin	9	6	3	-	3	R	0	-	-
(19) Nikolay Krasnikov	27	15	12	3	3	3	3
2	Sweden	45	22	23	6	15	23
(5) Stefan Svensson	27	10	17	2	3	3	3	3	3
(6) Per-Olov Serenius	14	9	5	-	1	2	-	1	1
(17) Per-Anders Lindström	4	3	1	0	1
3	Austria	41	20	21	6	16	21
(7) Harald Simon	7	0	7	R	R	2	2	1	2
(8) Martin Leitner	3	3	0	-	-	-	-	-	-
(18) Franz Zorn	31	17	14	3	3	3	3	2	R
4	Czech Republic	35	16	19	8	12	19
(3) Antonín Klatovský, Jr.	24	12	12	2	3	2	0	2	3
(4) Jan Klatovský	11	4	7	1	2	1	1	0	2
(16) Andrej Diviš	0	-	0
5	Finland	31	14	17	5	9	17
(13) Antti Aakko	26	12	14	3	2	1	2	3	3
(14) Kai Lehtinen	2	2	0	0	-	0	-	X	-
(21) Mats Järf	3	0	3	0	1	2
6	Germany	26	13	13	4	11	13
(1) Stefan Pletschacher	12	4	8	1	1	2	2	1	1
(2) Max Niedermaier	14	9	5	2	-	3	0	0	0
(15) Johann Weber	0	0	0	0
7	Netherlands	23	13	10	4	6	10
(11) René Stellingwerf	11	5	6	1	1	1	1	2	R
(12) Sven Holstein	12	8	4	2	Fx	0	0	1	1
(20) René Verhoef	0	-	0
Placing	Pair / Rider Name	Total	Day 1	Day 2	22	23	24	25	26	27	28	29	30	31	32	33	34	35	36	37	38	39	40	41	42

m - exclusion for exceeding two minute time allowance • t - exclusion for touching the tapes • x - other exclusion • e - retired or mechanical failure • f - fell
ns - non-starter • nc - non-classify

gate A - inside	gate B	gate C	gate D - outside

== See also ==
- 2010 Individual Ice Racing World Championship
- 2010 Speedway World Cup in classic speedway
- 2010 Speedway Grand Prix in classic speedway
