= 2015 Team Ice Racing World Championship =

Ice speedway event

Ice Speedway of Nations
- Location: Berlin, Germany
- Start date: 28 February 2015
- End date: 1 March 2015

The 2015 Team Ice Racing World Championship was the 37th edition of the Team World Championship. The final was held on 28 February and 1 March 2015, in Berlin, Germany.

Russia won their 13th consecutive title and 21st title overall.

== Final classification ==
Pos	Riders	Pts
1	(Russia) Daniil Ivanov 16, Dmitry Khomitsevich 20, Nikolay Krasnikov 20	56
2	(Austria) Franz Zorn 31, Harald Simon 23, Charly Ebner Jr. 0	54
3	(Czech Republic) Antonin Klatovsky Jr. 22, Jan Klatovsky 20, Lukas Hutla 0	42
4	(Sweden) Daniel Henderson 10, Niclas Kallin Svensson 10, Ove Ledström 17	37
5	(Germany) Johann Weber 6, Max Niedermaier 11, Günther Bauer 12	29
6	(Finland) Tomi Tarni 18, Mikko Jetsonen 1, Erkki Aakko 0	19
7	(Switzerland) Simon Gartmann 9, Markus Birn 5, Thomas Cavigelli 1	15

== See also ==
- 2015 Individual Ice Racing World Championship
- 2015 Speedway World Cup in classic speedway
- 2015 Speedway Grand Prix in classic speedway
