= 1999 Team Ice Racing World Championship =

Ice speedway event

Ice Speedway of Nations
- Location: Berlin, Germany
- Start date: 1999
- End date: 1999

The 1999 Team Ice Racing World Championship was the 21st edition of the Team World Championship. The final was held on ?, 1999, in Berlin, in Germany.

Russia won the title.

== Final Classification ==
Pos	Riders	Pts
1	(Russia) Alexander Balashov 23 (10+13), Vladimir Fadeev 21 (10+11), Kirilł Drogalin 9 (6+3)	53
2	(Sweden) Stefan Svensson 28 (12+16), Per-Olof Serenius 20 (11+9), Kent Peltonen 2 (dnr +2)	50
3	(Austria) Franz Zorn 29 (13+16), Harald Simon 7 (4+3), Josef Böhm 0 (0+dnr)	30
4	(Germany) Jürgen Liebmann 22 (14+8), Günther Bauer 7 (0+7), Markus Schwaiger 6 (5+1)	35
5	(Finland) Aki Ala Riihimaki 26 (13+13), Antti Aakko 4 (3+1), Jari Ahlbom 1 (1+0)	33
6	(Czech Republic) Antonin Klatovsky 12 (8+4), Stanislav Dyk 12 (2+10), Jaromir Lach 0 (0+0)	24
7	(Netherlands) Tjitte Bootsma 18 (11+7), Dennis Van Beuggen 3 (0+3), Jan De Pruis 2 (1+1)	23

== See also ==
- 1999 Individual Ice Speedway World Championship
- 1999 Speedway World Team Cup in classic speedway
- 1999 Speedway Grand Prix in classic speedway
