= 2012 Team Ice Racing World Championship =

Ice speedway event

Ice Speedway of Nations
- Location: Tolyatti, Russia
- Start date: 25 February 2012
- End date: 26 February 2012

The 2012 FIM Team Ice Speedway Gladiators World Championship was the 34th edition and the 2011 version of FIM Team Ice Racing World Championship season. The Final will take place in Tolyatti, Russia on 25-26 February 2011.

The championship was won by the defending champion Russia (59 points), who they beat Austria (44 pts) and Czech Republic (37 pts).

== World Final ==
=== Results ===
- 25-26 February 2011
- (Russia) Tolyatti, Samara Oblast
- Anatoly Stepanov Stadium (Length: 300m)
- Referee: (Poland) Marek Wojaczek
- Jury President: (Czech Republic) Petr Ondrasik
- References

| Pos. | National team | Day 1 | Day 2 | Total points |
|---|---|---|---|---|
| 1 | Russia (MFR) | 30 | 29 | 59 |
| 2 | Austria (OeAMTC) | 22 | 22 | 44 |
| 3 | Czech Republic (ACCR) | 20 | 17 | 37 |
| 4 | Finland (SML) | 20 | 15 | 35 |
| 5 | Sweden (SVEMO) | 15 | 17 | 32 |
| 6 | Germany (DMSB) | 13 | 16 | 29 |
| 7 | Netherlands (KNMV) | 6 | 10 | 16 |

=== Heat details - Day One ===
| Placing | Pair / Rider Name | Total | 1 | 2 | 3 | 4 | 5 | 6 | 7 | 8 | 9 | 10 | 11 | 12 | 13 | 14 | 15 | 16 | 17 | 18 | 19 | 20 | 21 |
| 1 | Russia | 30 | | | | | | | 10 | | | | | | | 20 | | | | | | | 30 |
| 1 | (9) Daniil Ivanov | 14 | | | 3 | | | - | | | | 3 | | 2* | | | 3 | | | | | 3 |
| 1 | (10) Nikolay Krasnikov | 8 | | | 2* | | | 3 | | | | - | | 3 | | | - | | | | | - |
| 1 | (19) Dmitry Khomitsevich | 8 | | | | | | 2* | | | | 2* | | | | | 2* | | | | | 2* |
| 2 | Austria | 22 | | | | | | | 9 | | | | | | | 18 | | | | | | | 22 |
| 2 | (5) Harald Simon | 13 | | 2* | | | 3 | | | 2* | | | | | 3 | | | | 3 | | | - |
| 2 | (6) Martin Leitner | 0 | | - | | | - | | | - | | | | | - | | | | - | | | 0 |
| 2 | (17) Franz Zorn | 9 | | 3 | | | 1 | | | 3 | | | | | 1 | | | | 0 | | | 1 |
| 3 | Finland | 20 | | | | | | | 6 | | | | | | | 13 | | | | | | | 20 |
| 3 | (11) Antti Aakko | 15 | | | 1 | | | | 3 | | | | 3 | | 2 | | | 3 | | | | | 3 |
| 3 | (12) Mats Jarf | 5 | | | 0 | | | | 2* | | | | 2* | | 0 | | | Fx | | | | | 1 |
| 3 | (20) Janne Vilponen | 0 |
| 4 | Czech Republic | 20 | | | | | | | 7 | | | | | | | 13 | | | | | | | 20 |
| 4 | (3) Antonin Klatovsky | 10 | 3 | | | | 2 | | | | 3 | | | Fx | | | | 1 | | | 1 |
| 4 | (4) Jan Klatovsky | 10 | 2* | | | | 0 | | | | 2* | | | 1 | | | | 2 | | | 3 |
| 4 | (16) Jan Pecina | 0 |
| 5 | Sweden | 15 | | | | | | | 6 | | | | | | | 10 | | | | | | | 15 |
| 5 | (13) Robert Henderson | 9 | | | | 3 | | | 0 | | | 0 | | | | 2 | | | 2 | | 2 |
| 5 | (14) Stefan Svensson | 6 | | | | 2* | | | 1 | | | 1 | | | | 1* | | | 1* | | 0 |
| 5 | (21) Per-Olof Serenius | 0 |
| 6 | Germany | 13 | | | | | | | 2 | | | | | | | 6 | | | | | | | 13 |
| 6 | (7) Gunther Bauer | 8 | | 1 | | | | 0 | | | 1 | | | | | 3 | | | | 3 | | | - |
| 6 | (8) Stefan Pletschacher | 3 | | - | | | | 1 | | | 0 | | | | | - | | | | 2* | | | 0 |
| 6 | (18) Max Niedermaier | 2 | | 0 | | | | | | | | | | | | 0 | | | | | | | 2 |
| 7 | Netherlands | 6 | | | | | | | 2 | | | | | | | 4 | | | | | | | 6 |
| 7 | (1) Rene Stellingwerf | 4 | X | | | 1 | | | | 1 | | | 1 | | | | - | | | 1 |
| 7 | (2) Gerrit Oege Schukken | 1 | 1 | | | - | | | | 0 | | | 0 | | | | 0 | | | - |
| 7 | (15) Simon Reitsma | 1 | | | | 0 | | | | | | | | | | | 1 | | | 0 |
| Placing | Pair / Rider Name | Total | 1 | 2 | 3 | 4 | 5 | 6 | 7 | 8 | 9 | 10 | 11 | 12 | 13 | 14 | 15 | 16 | 17 | 18 | 19 | 20 | 21 |

m - exclusion for exceeding two minute time allowance • t - exclusion for touching the tapes • x - other exclusion • e - retired or mechanical failure • f - fell
ns - non-starter • nc - non-classify

| gate A - inside | gate B | gate C | gate D - outside |

=== Heat details - Day Two ===
Placing | Pair / Rider Name | Points | 22 | 23 | 24 | 25 | 26 | 27 | 28 | 29 | 30 | 31 | 32 | 33 | 34 | 35 | 36 | 37 | 38 | 39 | 40 | 41 | 42
Total | Day 1 | Day 2
1 | Russia | 59 | 30 | 29 | 9 | 19 | 29
(9) Daniil Ivanov | 23 | 14 | 9 | 3 | - | 2* | - | 2* | 2*
(10) Nikolay Krasnikov | 18 | 8 | 10 | 1 | 3 | - | 3 | 3 | -
(19) Dmitry Khomitsevich | 18 | 8 | 10 | 2* | 3 | 2* | 3
2 | Austria | 44 | 22 | 22 | 6 | 16 | 22
(5) Harald Simon | 27 | 13 | 14 | 2 | 3 | 2* | 2* | 3 | 2
(6) Martin Leitner | 1 | 0 | 1 | - | - | - | - | - | 1
(17) Franz Zorn | 16 | 9 | 7 | 0 | 1 | 3 | 3 | R
3 | Czech Republic | 37 | 20 | 17 | 5 | 11 | 17
(3) Antonin Klatovsky | 20 | 10 | 10 | 2 | 2 | 0 | 3 | 1* | 2
(4) Jan Klatovsky | 17 | 10 | 7 | 0 | 1* | 1 | 2* | 2 | 1*
(16) Jan Pecina | 0 | - | 0
4 | Finland | 35 | 20 | 15 | 6 | 11 | 15
(11) Antti Aakko | 28 | 15 | 13 | 3 | 3 | 1 | 3 | 3 | -
(12) Mats Jarf | 7 | 5 | 2 | 0 | 0 | 0 | 1 | 0 | 1
(20) Janne Vilponen | 0 | - | 0 | 0
5 | Sweden | 32 | 15 | 17 | 6 | 10 | 17
(13) Robert Henderson | 21 | 9 | 12 | 3 | 2 | 3 | 1 | 2 | 1
(14) Stefan Svensson | 11 | 6 | 5 | 1 | 0 | X | 0 | 1* | 3
(21) Per-Olof Serenius | 0 | - | 0
6 | Germany | 29 | 13 | 16 | 8 | 12 | 16
(7) Gunther Bauer | 12 | 8 | 4 | 1* | 2* | 1 | 0 | - | -
(8) Stefan Pletschacher | 6 | 3 | 3 | - | - | - | - | 0 | 3
(18) Max Niedermaier | 11 | 2 | 9 | 2 | 3 | 2 | 1 | 1 | X
7 | Netherlands | 16 | 6 | 10 | 2 | 5 | 10
(1) Rene Stellingwerf | 14 | 4 | 10 | 1 | 1 | 2 | 1 | 2 | 3
(2) Gerrit Oege Schukken | 1 | 1 | 0 | - | 0 | - | 0 | - | -
(15) Simon Reitsma | 1 | 1 | 0 | T | 0 | 0 | 0
Placing | Pair / Rider Name | Total | Day 1 | Day 2 | 22 | 23 | 24 | 25 | 26 | 27 | 28 | 29 | 30 | 31 | 32 | 33 | 34 | 35 | 36 | 37 | 38 | 39 | 40 | 41 | 42

m - exclusion for exceeding two minute time allowance • t - exclusion for touching the tapes • x - other exclusion • e - retired or mechanical failure • f - fell
ns - non-starter • nc - non-classify

| gate A - inside | gate B | gate C | gate D - outside |

== See also ==
- 2012 Individual Ice Racing World Championship
- 2012 Speedway World Cup in classic speedway
- 2012 Speedway Grand Prix in classic speedway
