= 2009 Team Ice Racing World Championship =

Ice speedway event

Ice Speedway of Nations
- Location: Inzell, Germany
- Start date: 31 January 2009
- End date: 1 February 2009

The 2009 Team Ice Racing World Championship was the 31st edition of the Team World Championship. The final was held from 31 January to 1 February 2009, in Inzell, in Germany.

Russia won their 15th title.

== Final Classification ==
Pos	Riders	Pts
1	(Russia) Nikolay Krasnikov 26, Jounir Bazeev 19, Daniil Ivanov 10	55
2	(Austria) Franz Zorn 34, Harald Simon 1, Markus Skabraut 11	46
3	(Germany) Günther Bauer 32, Stefan Pletschacher 5, Florian Fürst 0	37
4	(Sweden) Per-Olof Serenius 14, Stefan Svensson 17, Per-Anders Lindström dnr	31
5	(Finland) Antti Aakko 18, Kai Lehtinen 1, Tommy Flyktman 8	27
6	(Czech Republic) Antonin Klatovsky 18, Jan Klatovsky 9, Andrei Divis DNR	27
7	(Netherlands) Johnny Tuinstra 3, Rene Stellingwerf 12, Sven Holstein 10	25

== See also ==
- 2009 Individual Ice Racing World Championship
- 2009 Speedway World Cup in classic speedway
- 2009 Speedway Grand Prix in classic speedway
