= 2016 Team Ice Racing World Championship =

Ice speedway event

Ice Speedway of Nations
- Location: Tolyatti, Russia
- Start date: 13 February 2016
- End date: 14 February 2016

The 2016 Team Ice Racing World Championship was the 38th edition of the Team World Championship. The final was held on 13/14 February, 2016, in Tolyatti, Russia.

Russia won their 14th consecutive title and 22nd title overall.

== Final classification ==
| Pos | Riders | Pts |
|---|---|---|
| 1 | (Russia) Dmitry Koltakov 23, Dmitry Khomitsevich 15, Nikolay Krasnikov 19 | 57 |
| 2 | (Sweden) Ove Ledström 29, Niclas Svensson 15, Daniel Henderson 4 | 48 |
| 3 | (Austria) Franz Zorn 17, Harald Simon 10, Manfred Seifter 19 | 46 |
| 4 | (Czech Republic) Jan Klatovsky 14, Anton Klavotsky 25, Rade Hutla 0 | 39 |
| 5 | (Germany) Stefan Pletschacher 4, Max Niedermaier 9, Günther Bauer 15 | 28 |
| 6 | (Finland) Antti Aakko 3, Mikko Jetsonen 7, Tomi Norola 11 | 21 |
| 7 | (Switzerland) Martin Glarner 1, Beat Dobler 10 | 11 |

== See also ==
- 2016 Individual Ice Racing World Championship
- 2016 Speedway World Cup in classic speedway
- 2016 Speedway Grand Prix in classic speedway
