= 2018 Team Ice Racing World Championship =

40th edition of the Team World Championship

Ice Speedway of Nations
- Venue: Shadrinsk, Russia
- Start date: 10 February 2018
- End date: 11 February 2018
- Nations: 6

The 2018 Team Ice Racing World Championship was the 40th edition of the Team World Championship. The final was held on 10 and 11 February 2018, in Shadrinsk, Russia.

== Final Classification ==
Pos	Riders	Pts
1	(Russia) Dmitry Khomitsevich 20, Daniil Ivanov 17, Dmitry Koltakov 13	50
2	(Sweden) Niclas Svensson 18, Ove Ledström 14, Martin Haarahiltunen 8	40
3	(Austria) Franz Zorn 19, Charly Ebner Jr 11, Harald Simon DNR	30
4	(Germany) Hans Weber 7, Max Niedermaier 5, Gunther Bauer 11	23
5	(Czech Republic) Radek Hutla 0, Luaks Hutla 18, Vladimir Visvader 2	20
6	(Finland) Matti Isoaho 14, Jussi Nyronen 0, Rami Systa 3	17

== See also ==
- 2018 Individual Ice Racing World Championship
- 2018 Speedway of Nations in classic speedway
- 2018 Speedway Grand Prix in classic speedway
