= 2007 Team Ice Racing World Championship =

Ice speedway event

Ice Speedway of Nations
- Location: Saransk, Russia
- Start date: 2 March 2007
- End date: 3 March 2007

The 2007 Team Ice Racing World Championship was the 29th edition of the Team World Championship. The final was held from2 to 3 March 2007, in Saransk, in Russia.

Russia won their 13th title.

== Final Classification ==
Pos	Riders	Pts
1	(Russia) Nikolay Krasnikov 12+22, Vitaly Khomitsevich 11+7, Mikhail Bogdanov 7+11	60
2	(Sweden) Stefan Svensson 15+11, Per-Olof Serenius 11+8, Torleif Burman ns+1	46
3	(Germany) Günther Bauer 5+12, Sebastian Gegenbauer 7+9, Dimitri Tschatschin 5+ns	38
4	(Czech Republic) Antonin Klatovsky 10+11, Jan Klatovsky 7+3, Andrej Divis ns+0	31
5	(Finland) Antti Aakko 12+14, Tommy Flyktman 1+2, Jouni Seppänen ns+0	29
6	(Austria) Harald Simon 11+11, Martin Leitner 0+2, Joseph Bruckner 1+0	25
7	(Netherlands) Johnny Tuinstra 10+10, René Stellingwerf 1+1, René Verhoef ns+ns	22

== See also ==
- 2007 Individual Ice Speedway World Championship
- 2007 Speedway World Cup in classic speedway
- 2007 Speedway Grand Prix in classic speedway
