= 2006 Team Ice Racing World Championship =

Ice speedway event

Ice Speedway of Nations
- Location: Berlin, Germany
- Start date: 18 March 2006
- End date: 19 March 2006

The 2006 Team Ice Racing World Championship was the 28th edition of the Team World Championship. The final was held on 18th & 19 March, 2006, in Berlin, in Germany.

Russia won their 12th title.

== Final Classification ==
Pos	Riders	Pts
1	(Russia) Nikolay Krasnikov, Jounir Bazeev, Mikhail Bogdanov	59
2	(Sweden) Per-Olof Serenius, Stefan Svensson, Ulf Engenström (DNR)	43
3	(Finland) Antti Aakko, Tommy Flyktman, Pekka Kartunen	42
4	(Germany) Viatscheslav Nikulin, Robert Eibl, Marian Kreklau	36
5	(Czech Republic) Antonín Klatovsky Jr., Jan Klatovsky, Jan Pecina (DNR)	36
6	(Netherlands) René Stellingwerf, Sven Holstein (DNR), Johnny Tuinstra	20
7	(Switzerland) Heinz Göldi, Philip Weiss, Simon Gartmann	15

== See also ==
- 2006 Individual Ice Speedway World Championship
- 2006 Speedway World Cup in classic speedway
- 2006 Speedway Grand Prix in classic speedway
