= 2005 Team Ice Racing World Championship =

Ice speedway event

Ice Speedway of Nations
- Location: Krasnogorsk, Russia
- Start date: 4 February 2005
- End date: 5 February 2005

The 2005 Team Ice Racing World Championship was the 27th edition of the Team World Championship. The final was held in Krasnogorsk, in Russia from 4 to 5 February 2005.

Russia won their 11th title.

== Final Classification ==
Pos	Riders	Pts
1	(Russia) Ivan Ivanov 10+10, Nikolay Krasnikov 7+10, Vitaly Khomitsevich 10+6	53
2	(European Union) Ilya Drozdov (Rus) 9+11, Maxim Zakharov (Rus) 10+9, Harald Simon (Aut) 3+2,	44
3	(Germany) Günther Bauer 9+13(+3), Robert Eibl 9+5, Marian Kreklau 1+0	37+3
4	(Sweden) Per-Olof Serenius 14+15(+2), Hans Olov Olsson 3+2, Tomas Ekström 2+1	37+2
5	(Czech Republic) Antonín Klatovsky Jr. 14+12, Jan Klatovsky 1+1, Jan Pecina 1+0	29
6	(Finland) Antti Aakko 13+16, Tomi Kirilov 0+0, Sami Räsänen (dnr)	29
7	(Netherlands) Johnny Tuinstra 7+11, René Stellingwerf 3+2, René Verhoef (dnr)	23

== See also ==
- 2005 Individual Ice Speedway World Championship
- 2005 Speedway World Cup in classic speedway
- 2005 Speedway Grand Prix in classic speedway
