= Grzegorz Knapp =

Polish speedway rider (1979–2014)

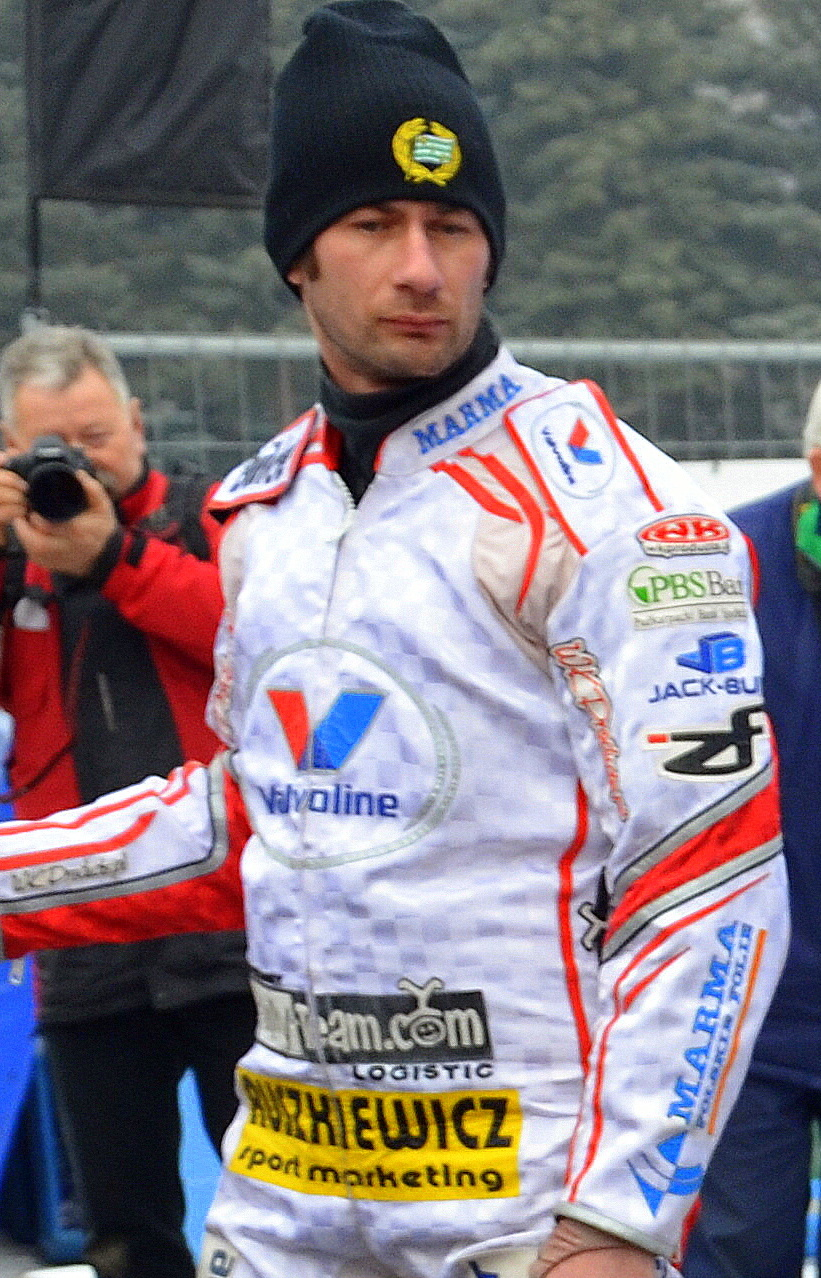
- Born: 18 March 1979; Wąbrzeźno, Poland
- Died: 22 June 2014 (aged 35); Heusden-Zolder, Belgium
- Nationality: Polish

Career history
- 1997-2002, 2005, 2009: Grudziądz
- 2003-2004, 2006: Lublin
- 2007: Gdańsk
- 2008: Rawicz

Team honours
- 1997: Team U-21 Polish Champion

Grzegorz Knapp (18 March 1979 – 22 June 2014) was a Polish speedway and ice speedway rider who rode for GTŻ Grudziądz in the Polish Speedway First League.

== Career ==
Knapp rode in the Team Speedway Polish Championship from 1997 to 2009. He rode primarily for GTŻ Grudziądz, but also appeared for Lublin, Wybrzeże Gdańsk and Kolejarz Rawicz.

Knapp died on 22 June 2014, aged 35, after a fatal accident during a speedway race.

== Ice speedway career details ==
=== World Championships ===
- Individual World Championship (Ice Racing Grand Prix)
  - 2010 - 15th placed (36 pts)

=== European Championships ===
- Individual European Championship
  - 2008 - (Poland) Sanok - 13 place

== See also ==
- Rider deaths in motorcycle speedway
