= Dinar Valeev =

Russian speedway rider

- Born: c. 1996; Russia
- Nationality: Russian

Individual honours
- 2021: Ice Speedway World Champion

Dinar Valeev (born c. 1996) is an international speedway rider from Russia.

== Speedway career ==
Valeev became a world champion when winning the Individual Ice Speedway World Championship in the 2021 Individual Ice Racing World Championship. Valeev defeated Igor Kononov in a race off after both riders finished on 36 points.

Valeev had previously won two bronze medals in 2019 Individual Ice Racing World Championship and 2020 Individual Ice Racing World Championship.
