= Individual Ice Speedway World Championship =

Ice speedway championship

Tournament information
- Sport: Ice Speedway
- Established: 1966
- Administrator: Fédération Internationale de Motocyclisme (FIM)
- Website: fim-icespeedway.com

The Individual Ice Speedway World Championship is an Ice speedway championship held annually to determine an individual World Champion.

== History ==
The first Championships were held in 1966. A European Championship was held for the two years preceding the World Championships. The event has been dominated by the Soviet Union/Russia, who have won all but seven of the World Championship titles since 1966. Sweden has won five times, Czechoslovakia twice and Finland once.

In 2021 and 2022 Russian athletes competed as neutral competitors using the designation MFR (Motorcycle Federation of Russia), as the Court of Arbitration for Sport upheld a ban on Russia competing at World Championships. The ban was implemented by the World Anti-Doping Agency in response to state-sponsored doping program of Russian athletes.

In March 2022, the FIM issued a total ban on Russian riders competing in international events, meaning they were unable to complete the remainder of the 2022 calendar or appear in the following seasons.

== Medalists ==
Year	Venue	Winner	Runner-up	3rd place
1966	(Soviet Union) 2 rounds	(Soviet Union) Gabdrakhman Kadyrov	(Soviet Union) Viktor Kuznetsov	(Czechoslovakia) Antonín Šváb Sr.
1967	(Soviet Union) 3 rounds	(Soviet Union) Boris Samorodov	(Soviet Union) Vyacheslav Dubinin	(Soviet Union) Vladimir Tsybrov
1968	(Soviet Union) 2 rounds	(Soviet Union) Gabdrakhman Kadyrov	(Soviet Union) Vladimir Tsybrov	(Soviet Union) Boris Samorodov
1969	(West Germany) Inzell	(Soviet Union) Gabdrakhman Kadyrov	(Soviet Union) Yury Lombotsky	(Soviet Union) Vladimir Tsybrov
1970	(Sweden) Nässjö	(Czechoslovakia) Antonín Šváb Sr.	(Soviet Union) Gabdrakhman Kadyrov	(Sweden) Kurt Westlund
1971	(West Germany) Inzell	(Soviet Union) Gabdrakhman Kadyrov	(Soviet Union) Vladimir Chekushev	(Czechoslovakia) Milan Špinka
1972	(Sweden) Nässjö	(Soviet Union) Gabdrakhman Kadyrov	(Czechoslovakia) Antonín Šváb Sr.	(Soviet Union) Vladimir Paznikov
1973	(West Germany) Inzell	(Soviet Union) Gabdrakhman Kadyrov	(Soviet Union) Boris Samorodov	(Soviet Union) Vladimir Paznikov
1974	(Sweden) Nässjö	(Czechoslovakia) Milan Špinka	(Soviet Union) Vladimir Tsybrov	(Soviet Union) Gabdrakhman Kadyrov
1975	(Soviet Union) Moscow	(Soviet Union) Sergey Tarabanko	(Soviet Union) Vladimir Tsybrov	(Soviet Union) Sergey Kazakov
1976	(Netherlands) Assen	(Soviet Union) Sergey Tarabanko	(Czechoslovakia) Milan Špinka	(Sweden) Conny Samuelsson
1977	(West Germany) Inzell	(Soviet Union) Sergey Tarabanko	(Sweden) Conny Samuelsson	(Czechoslovakia) Zdeněk Kudrna
1978	(Netherlands) Assen	(Soviet Union) Sergey Tarabanko	(Soviet Union) Anatoly Bondarenko	(Soviet Union) Anatoly Gladyshev
1979	(West Germany) Inzell	(Soviet Union) Anatoly Bondarenko	(Soviet Union) Vladimir Lyubich	(Czechoslovakia) Zdeněk Kudrna
1980	(Soviet Union) Kalinin	(Soviet Union) Anatoly Bondarenko	(Soviet Union) Sergey Tarabanko	(Soviet Union) Vladimir Sukhov
1981	(Netherlands) Assen	(Soviet Union) Vladimir Lyubich	(Soviet Union) Vladimir Sukhov	(Soviet Union) Anatoly Gladyshev
1982	(West Germany) Inzell	(Soviet Union) Sergey Kazakov	(Sweden) Per-Olof Serenius	(Soviet Union) Vladimir Subbotin
1983	(Netherlands) Eindhoven	(Soviet Union) Sergey Kazakov	(Soviet Union) Anatoly Bondarenko	(Sweden) Erik Stenlund
1984	(Soviet Union) Moscow	(Sweden) Erik Stenlund	(Soviet Union) Vladimir Sukhov	(Soviet Union) Yuri Ivanov
1985	(Netherlands) Assen	(Soviet Union) Vladimir Sukhov	(Finland) Jarmo Hirvasoja	(Soviet Union) Yuri Ivanov
1986	(Sweden) Stockholm	(Soviet Union) Yuri Ivanov	(Soviet Union) Vladimir Sukhov	(Sweden) Erik Stenlund
1987	(West Germany) West Berlin	(Soviet Union) Yuri Ivanov	(Soviet Union) Vladimir Sukhov	(Soviet Union) Vitaly Russkikh
1988	(Netherlands) Eindhoven	(Sweden) Erik Stenlund	(Soviet Union) Yuri Ivanov	(Soviet Union) Sergey Ivanov
1989	(Soviet Union) Alma-Ata	(Soviet Union) Nikolay Nishchenko	(Soviet Union) Yuri Ivanov	(Soviet Union) Vladimir Sukhov
1990	(Sweden) Gothenburg	(Finland) Jarmo Hirvasoja	(Soviet Union) Nikolay Nishchenko	(Soviet Union) Sergey Ivanov
1991	(Netherlands) Assen	(Soviet Union) Sergey Ivanov	(Sweden) Per-Olof Serenius	(Germany) Michael Lang
1992	(Germany) Frankfurt	(Commonwealth of Independent States) Yuri Ivanov	(Czechoslovakia) Antonín Klatovský	(Sweden) Stefan Svensson
1993	(Russia) Saransk	(Russia) Vladimir Fadeev	(Russia) Alexander Balashov	(Germany) Michael Lang
1994	10 Rounds GP	(Russia) Alexander Balashov	(Sweden) Per-Olof Serenius	(Russia) Vyacheslav Nikulin
1995	10 Rounds GP	(Sweden) Per-Olof Serenius	(Russia) Alexander Balashov	(Russia) Vyacheslav Nikulin
1996	10 Rounds GP	(Russia) Alexander Balashov	(Russia) Yury Polikarpov	(Russia) Vyacheslav Nikulin
1997	(Netherlands) Assen	(Russia) Kirilł Drogalin	(Russia) Alexander Balashov	(Finland) Jari Ahlbom
1998	10 Rounds GP	(Russia) Alexander Balashov	(Russia) Kirilł Drogalin	(Russia) Vyacheslav Nikulin
1999	10 Rounds GP	(Russia) Vladimir Fadeev	(Russia) Alexander Balashov	(Germany) Vyacheslav Nikulin
2000	(Netherlands) Assen	(Russia) Kirilł Drogalin	(Austria) Franz Zorn	(Russia) Vladimir Fadeev
2001	8 Rounds GP	(Russia) Kirilł Drogalin	(Russia) Vladimir Fadeev	(Germany) Vyacheslav Nikulin
2002	8 Rounds GP	(Sweden) Per-Olof Serenius	(Germany) Vyacheslav Nikulin	(Russia) Yury Polikarpov
2003	6 Rounds GP	(Russia) Vitaly Khomitsevich	(Germany) Günther Bauer	(Russia) Vladimir Lumpov
2004	8 Rounds GP	(Russia) Dmitry Bulankin	(Russia) Vitaly Khomitsevich	(Russia) Nikolay Krasnikov
2005	6 Rounds GP	(Russia) Nikolay Krasnikov	(Russia) Vitaly Khomitsevich	(Russia) Ivan Ivanov
2006	4 Rounds GP	(Russia) Nikolay Krasnikov	(Russia) Yunir Bazeyev	(Russia) Mikhail Bogdanov
2007	6 Rounds GP	(Russia) Nikolay Krasnikov	(Russia) Vitaly Khomitsevich	(Russia) Ivan Ivanov
2008	6 Rounds GP	(Russia) Nikolay Krasnikov	(Russia) Vitaly Khomitsevich	(Austria) Franz Zorn
2009	8 Rounds GP	(Russia) Nikolay Krasnikov	(Russia) Daniil Ivanov	(Austria) Franz Zorn
2010	9 Rounds GP	(Russia) Nikolay Krasnikov	(Russia) Daniil Ivanov	(Russia) Dmitry Khomitsevich
2011	8 Rounds GP	(Russia) Nikolay Krasnikov	(Russia) Igor Kononov	(Russia) Daniil Ivanov
2012	8 Rounds GP	(Russia) Nikolay Krasnikov	(Russia) Daniil Ivanov	(Russia) Dmitry Khomitsevich
2013	10 Rounds GP	(Russia) Daniil Ivanov	(Russia) Dmitry Koltakov	(Russia) Dmitry Khomitsevich
2014	8 Rounds GP	(Russia) Daniil Ivanov	(Russia) Dmitry Koltakov	(Russia) Dmitry Khomitsevich
2015	10 Rounds GP	(Russia) Dmitry Koltakov	(Russia) Daniil Ivanov	(Russia) Dmitry Khomitsevich
2016	10 Rounds GP	(Russia) Dmitry Khomitsevich	(Russia) Dmitry Koltakov	(Russia) Daniil Ivanov
2017	10 Rounds GP	(Russia) Dmitry Koltakov	(Russia) Igor Kononov	(Russia) Dmitry Khomitsevich
2018	10 Rounds GP	(Russia) Dmitry Koltakov	(Russia) Daniil Ivanov	(Russia) Dmitry Khomitsevich
2019	10 Rounds GP	(Russia) Daniil Ivanov	(Russia) Dmitry Koltakov	(Russia) Dinar Valeev
2020	6 Rounds GP	(Russia) Daniil Ivanov	(Russia) Dmitry Khomitsevich	(Russia) Dinar Valeev
2021	(Russia) Tolyatti	(Motorcycle Federation of Russia) Dinar Valeev	(Motorcycle Federation of Russia) Igor Kononov	(Motorcycle Federation of Russia) Dmitry Khomitsevich
2022	4 Rounds GP	(Sweden) Martin Haarahiltunen	(Germany) Johann Weber	(Motorcycle Federation of Russia) Nikita Bogdanov
2023	(Germany) Inzell	(Sweden) Martin Haarahiltunen	(Austria) Franz Zorn	(Austria) Harald Simon
2024	4 Rounds GP	(Sweden) Martin Haarahiltunen	(Germany) Max Niedermayer	(Finland) Heikki Huusko
2025	4 Rounds GP	(Sweden) Martin Haarahiltunen	(Sweden) Niclas Svensson	(Finland) Max Koivula
2026	3 Rounds GP	(Sweden) Niclas Svensson	(Finland) Max Koivula	(Germany) Luca Bauer

== See also ==
- Ice speedway
- Ice racing
- Team Ice Racing World Championship
