= Dmitry Bulankin =

Russian speedway rider

- Born: August 8, 1978 (age 48); Penza, RSFSR, USSR
- Nationality: Russian

Individual honours
- 2004: World Champion

Team honours
- 2010: World Team Champion

Dmitry Aleksandrovich Bulankin (Russian: Дмитрий Александрович Буланкин; born August 8, 1978) is a two-time Russian ice speedway world champion.

== Career ==
Bulankin won the Individual Ice Speedway World Championship title in 2004 and the Team Ice Racing World Championship titles with Russia in 2010.
