= Nikolay Krasnikov =

Russian speedway rider (1985–2025)

- Born: 4 February 1985; Ufa, Bashkir ASSR, Russian SFSR, USSR
- Died: 16 June 2025 (aged 40); Kushnarenkovsky District, Bashkortostan, Russia
- Nationality: Russian

Individual honours
- 2005 2006 2007 2008 2009 2010 2011 2012: World Champion

Team honours
- 2004 2005 2006 2007 2008 2009 2010 2011 2012 2013 2015 2016: World Team Champion

Nikolay Olegovich Krasnikov (Russian: Николай Олегович Красников; 4 February 1985 – 16 June 2025) was a Russian twenty-time ice speedway world champion.

== Career ==
After finishing third at the 2004 Individual Ice Speedway World Championship, Krasnikov won eight consecutive Individual Ice Speedway World Championship titles from 2005 until 2012, and twelve Team Ice Racing World Championship titles with Russia from 2004 until 2016. He is regarded as one of the leading ice speedway riders of all-time.

== Death ==
Krasnikov died in a traffic collision in Kushnarenkovsky District, Bashkortostan, Russia, on 16 June 2025, at the age of 40.
