= Vladimir Fadeev =

Russian speedway rider

Personal information
- Nationality: Russian
- Born: 26 April 1958 (age 68) Soviet Union

Sport
- Sport: Ice speedway
Medal record
Representing Russia
World championships
Gold medal – first place	1993	Individual
Gold medal – first place	1993	Team
Gold medal – first place	1994	Team
Silver medal – second place	1995	Team
Gold medal – first place	1996	Team
Gold medal – first place	1999	Team
Gold medal – first place	2000	Team
Gold medal – first place	1999	Individual
Bronze medal – third place	2000	Individual
Gold medal – first place	2001	Team
Silver medal – second place	2001	Individual
Silver medal – second place	2002	Team

Vladimir Fadeev (born 26 April 1958) is a former international speedway rider from Russia.

== Speedway career ==
Fadeev is a two-time individual world champion winning the gold medal at the Individual Ice Speedway World Championship in the 1993 Individual Ice Speedway World Championship and 1999 Individual Ice Speedway World Championship.

In addition, Fadeev won the Team Ice Racing World Championship six times (1993, 1994, 1996, 1999, 2000 and 2001).
