= Kirilł Drogalin =

Russian speedway rider

- Born: February 21, 1963 (age 63); Moscow, Russia
- Nationality: Russian

Individual honours
- 1997 2000 2001: World Champion

Team honours
- 1997 1998 1999 2000 2001: World Team Champion

Kirilł Drogalin is a Russian, eight time, ice speedway world champion.

== Career ==
Drogalin won the Individual Ice Speedway World Championship title in 1997, 2000, and 2001, and the Team Ice Racing World Championship titles with Russia in 1997, 1998, 1999, 2000, and 2001.
