= Dmitry Koltakov =

Russian speedway rider

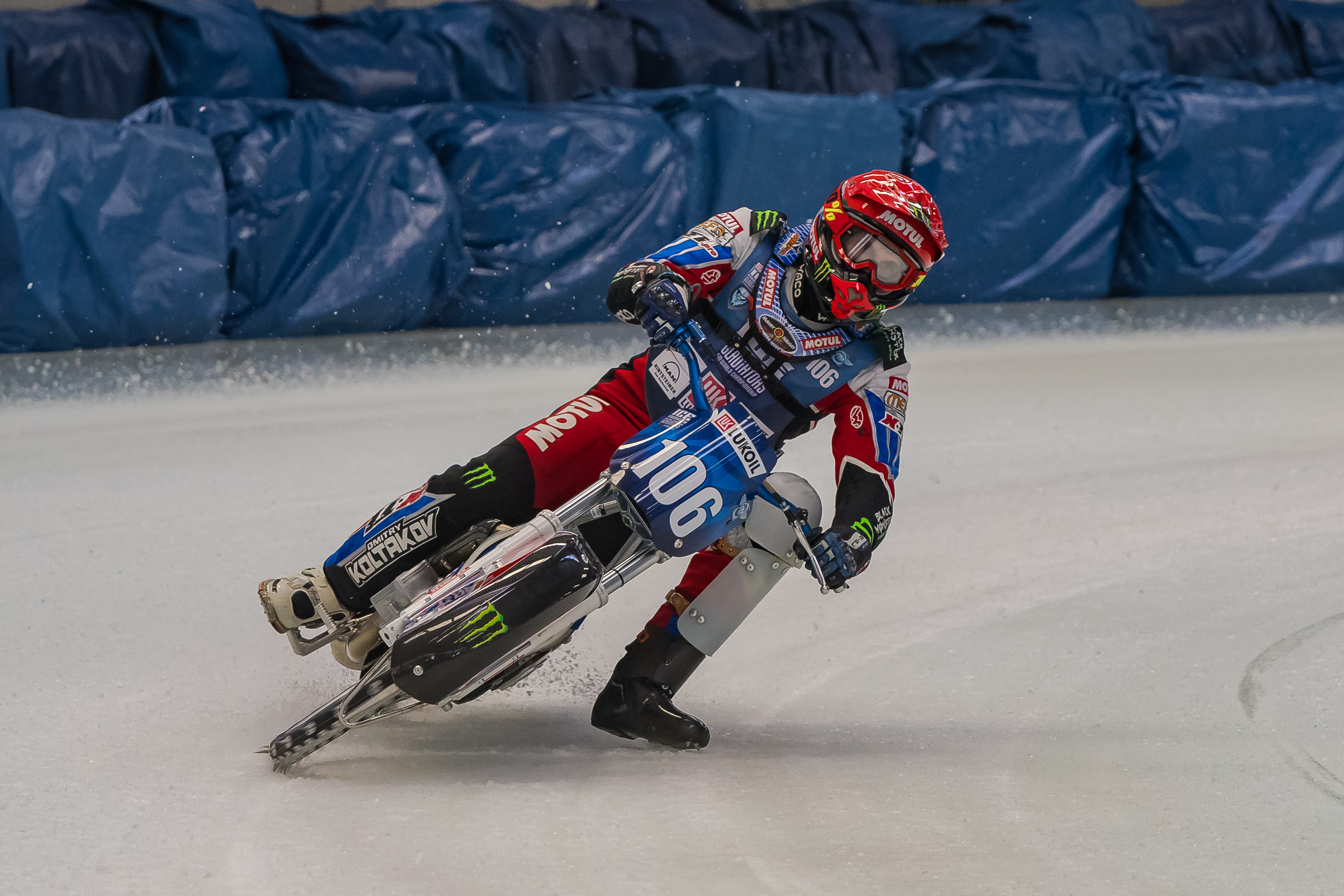
- Born: December 6, 1990 (age 35); Kurgan, Russia
- Nationality: Russian

Individual honours
- 2015, 2017 2018: World Individual Champion

Team honours
- 2013, 2014 2016, 2017 2018: World Team Champion

Dmitry Sergeyevich Koltakov (Russian: Дми́трий Серге́евич Колтако́в; born 6 September 1990) is a Russian three-time ice speedway individual world champion and five-time World Team champion.

== Career ==
Koltakov won the Individual Ice Speedway World Championship titles in 2015 and 2017. His third title came when he won the 2018 Individual Ice Racing World Championship in dominating fashion. He won nine of the ten rounds and was a clear 35 points ahead of his nearest rival Daniil Ivanov.

Koltakov also won the Team Ice Racing World Championship titles with Russia on five occasions in 2013, 2014, 2016, 2017 and 2018.
