= Vitaly Khomitsevich =

Russian speedway rider

- Born: November 18, 1978 (age 48); Kamensk-Uralsky, Russia
- Nationality: Russian

Individual honours
- 2003: World Champion

Team honours
- 2003 2004 2005 2007 2008: World Team Champion

Vitaly Walerjewicz Khomitsevich (born 18 November 1978) is a six-time Russian ice speedway world champion.

== Career ==
Khomitsevich won the Individual Ice Speedway World Championship title in 2003. He finished runner-up four times from 2004 to 2008, three of them behind Nikolay Krasnikov.

Khomitsevich won the Team Ice Racing World Championship titles with Russia in 2003, 2004, 2005, 2007 and 2008.

Khomitsevich's younger brother is another multiple world champion Dmitry Khomitsevich.
