= Dmitry Khomitsevich =

Russian speedway rider

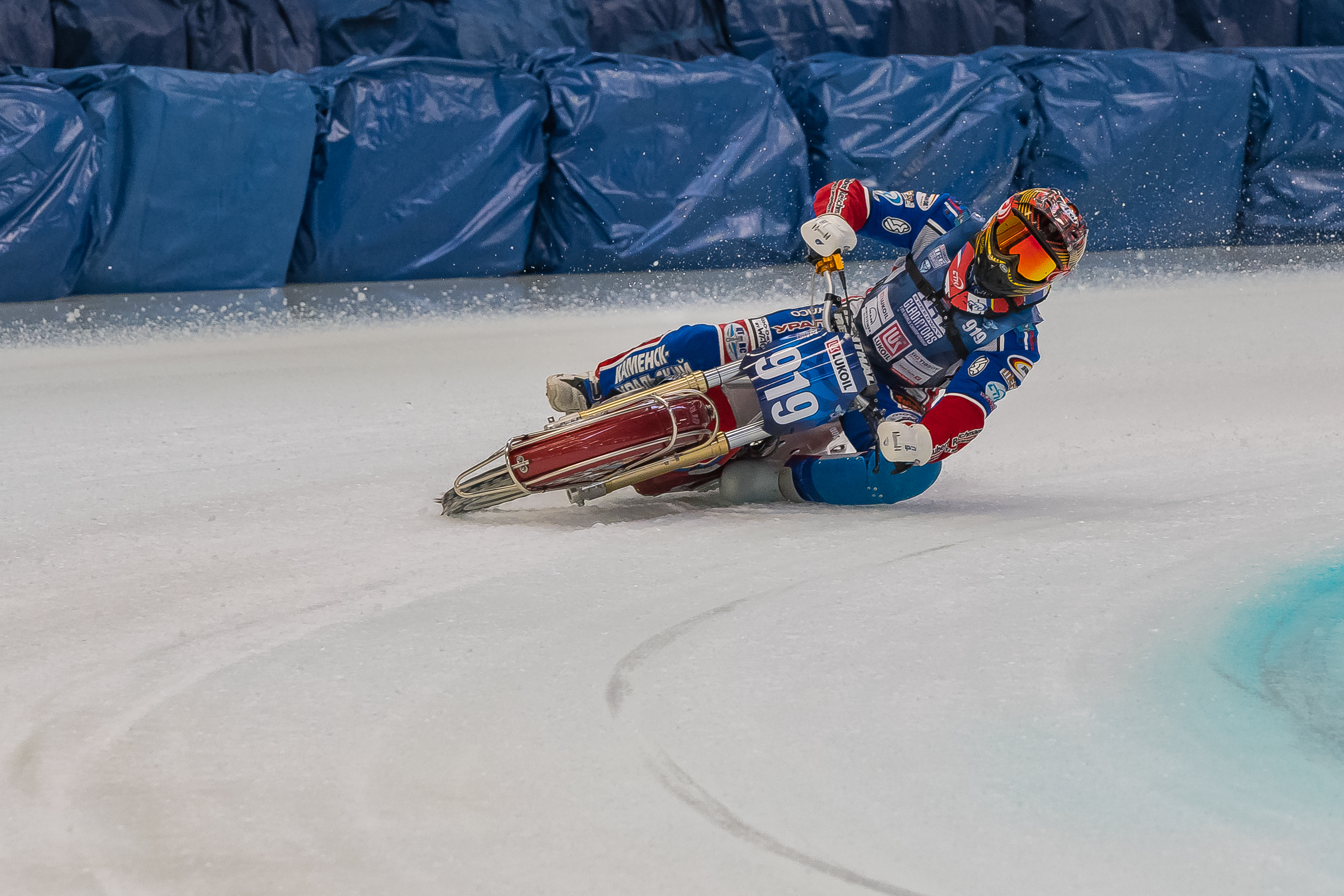
- Born: October 18, 1985 (age 41); Kamensk-Uralsky, Russia
- Nationality: Russian

Individual honours
- 2016: World Individual Champion

Team honours
- 2010, 2011 2012, 2015 2016, 2017 2018, 2019 2020: World Team Champion

Dmitry Valerievich Khomitsevich (Russian: Дми́трий Вале́рьевич Хомице́вич; born October 18, 1985) is a Russian seven-time ice speedway world champion.

== Career ==
Khomitsevich finished in the bronze medal position five times from 2011 to 2015 before finally winning the 2016 Individual Ice Racing World Championship. He then secured two more bronze medals in 2017 and 2018 before winning a silver for the first time behind Daniil Ivanov at the 2020 Individual Ice Racing World Championship.

Khomitsevich won the Individual Ice Speedway World Championship title in 2016 and the Team Ice Racing World Championship nine times with Russia, in 2010, 2011, 2012, 2015, 2016, 2017, 2018, 2019 and 2020.

Khomitsevich's older brother is another multiple world champion Vitaly Khomitsevich.
