= Daniil Ivanov =

Russian motorcycle speedway rider

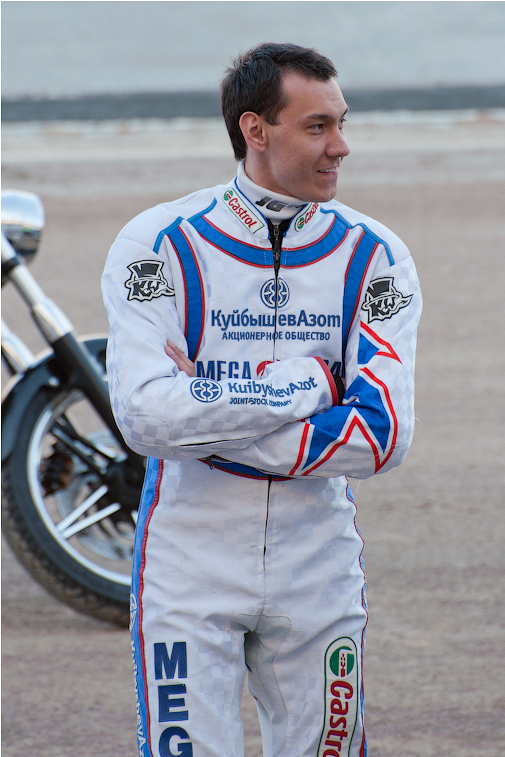
- Born: September 23, 1986 (age 40); Kamensk-Uralsky, Russia
- Nationality: Russian

Career history

Russia
- 2003–2015: Togliatti

Poland
- 2007–2008: Tarnów
- 2009: Daugavpils
- 2010: Kraków
- 2011: Piła
- 2012: Bydgoszcz

Individual honours
- 2013, 2014, 2019, 2020: Ice Racing Individual World Champion

Team honours
- 2009, 2011, 2012 2013, 2014, 2015 2018, 2019, 2020: Team Ice Racing World Champion

Daniil Valerievich Ivanov (born 23 September 1986) is a former international motorcycle speedway and ice speedway rider from Russia.

== Speedway career ==
Ivanov is a four-time World Champion winning the gold medal at the Individual Ice Speedway World Championship in the 2013 Individual Ice Racing World Championship, 2014 Individual Ice Racing World Championship, 2019 Individual Ice Racing World Championship and 2020 Individual Ice Racing World Championship.

Ivanov is also a nine-time world champion having won the Ice Speedway of Nations on nine occasions. He has also represented Russia in the 2007 Speedway World Cup.

In 2021, Ivanov finished fourth during the defence of his world title and in 2022, Ivanov was unable to take part in any competition following the Fédération Internationale de Motocyclisme ban on Russian and Belarusian motorcycle riders, teams, officials, and competitions as a result of the 2022 Russian invasion of Ukraine.

== Honours ==
- Ice Individual World Champion: 2013, 2014, 2019, 2020
- Ice Team World Champion: 2009, 2011, 2012, 2013, 2014, 2015, 2018, 2019, 2020
- European Pairs Championship finalist: 2006
- Russian Individual Speedway Championship: 2009 & 2011 silver medal, 2006 bronze medal
- Individual U-21 World Championship finalist: 2007
- Team U-21 World Championship semi-finalist: 2005, 2006
- Individual Junior Russian Championship: 2003 bronze medal, 2004 silver medal, 2006 silver medal

== See also ==
- Russia national speedway team
