= 1984 Team Ice Racing World Championship =

Seasons
- ← 1983 1985 →

The 1984 Team Ice Racing World Championship was the sixth edition of the Team World Championship. The final was held on 10/11 March, 1984, in Deventer in the Netherlands. The Soviet Union won their fifth title.

== Classification ==
Pos	Riders	Pts
1	(Soviet Union) Sergei Kasakov 27, Vladimir Suchov 19, Vladimir Lioubitch 6	52
2	(Sweden) Erik Stenlund 36, Per-Olof Serenius 16, Hans Johansson dnr	52
3	(Finland) Jarmo Hirvasoja 30, Timo Sinkkonen 0, Jarmo Rejma 7	37
4	(West Germany) Max Niedermaier 24, Gunther Brandt 7, Helmut Weber 6	37
5	(Austria) Franz Schiefer 18, Walter Wartbichler 11, Franz Lackner 1	30
6	(Netherlands) Roelof Thijs 24, Gerrit Rook 5, Johan Last 0	29
7	(United Kingdom) Bruce Cribb 15, Pat McCann 0, Neil Tuxworth 0	15

== See also ==
- 1984 Individual Ice Speedway World Championship
- 1984 Speedway World Team Cup in classic speedway
- 1984 Individual Speedway World Championship in classic speedway
