= 1985 Team Ice Racing World Championship =

Ice racing

Seasons
- ← 1984 1986 →

The 1985 Team Ice Racing World Championship was the seventh edition of the Team World Championship. The final was held on 2nd/3rd March 1985, in Inzell, Germany. Sweden won their first title.

== Classification ==
Pos	Riders	Pts
1	(Sweden) Erik Stenlund 34, Per-Olof Serenius 26, Tommy Lindgren 8	68
2	(Soviet Union) Vladimir Suchov 29, Yuri Ivanov 17, Sergei Kasakov 10	56
3	(West Germany) Helmut Weber 21, Max Niedermaier Sr. 21, Michael Neumaier 4	46
4	(Finland) Jarmo Hirvasoja 29, Jarmo Reima 5, Hannu Larronmaa 5	39
5	(Czechoslovakia) Antonin Klatovsky 16, Jan Verner 12, Stanislav Dyk 2	30

== See also ==
- 1985 Individual Ice Speedway World Championship
- 1985 Speedway World Team Cup in classic speedway
- 1985 Individual Speedway World Championship in classic speedway
