= 1996 Team Ice Racing World Championship =

Seasons
- ← 1995 1997 →

The 1996 Team Ice Racing World Championship was the 18th edition of the Team World Championship. The final was held on ?, 1996, in Izhevsk, in Russia.

Russia won the title.

== Final Classification ==
Pos	Riders	Pts
1	(Russia) Alexander Balashov 35(17+18), Vladimir Fadeev 17(7+10), Igor Jakovlev 2(2+0)	54
2	(Sweden) Stefan Svensson 28(14+14), Per-Olof Serenius 18(11+7), Ola Westlund 0 dnr	46
3	(Kazakhstan) Nail Galiakberov 18(10+8), Vladimir Cheblakov 11(5+6), Stanislav Kuznetsov 10(5+5)	39
4	(Finland) Jari Ahlbom 26(13+13), Aki Ala Riihimaki 11(2+9), Seppo Siira 0(0+0)	37
5	(Czech Republic) Stanislav Dyk 18(9+9), Antonin Klatovsky 15(7+8), Jiri Petrasek 0 dnr	33
6	(Germany) Michael Lang 14(6+8), Gunther Bauer 11(8+3), Helmut Weber 2(0+2)	27

== See also ==
- 1996 Individual Ice Speedway World Championship
- 1996 Speedway World Team Cup in classic speedway
- 1996 Speedway Grand Prix in classic speedway
