= 1988 Team Ice Racing World Championship =

Seasons
- ← 1987 1989 →

The 1988 Team Ice Racing World Championship was the tenth edition of the Team World Championship. The final was held on 5th/6th March 1988, in Grenoble, France.

The Soviet Union won their eighth title.

== Classification ==
| Pos | Riders | Pts |
|---|---|---|
| 1 | (Soviet Union) Yuri Ivanov 29, Sergei Kasakov 21, Vitaly Russkich 13 | 63 |
| 2 | (Sweden) Erik Stenlund 29, Per-Olof Serenius 20, Jan Sigurd 5 | 54 |
| 3 | (Finland) Hannu Larronmaa 9, Peter Nybo 9, Jarmo Hirvasoja 35 | 53 |
| 4 | (Czechoslovakia) Jiri Svoboda 22, Stanislav Dyk 16, Antonin Klatovsky 15 | 53 |
| 5 | (France) Christian Ianotto 10, Joel Delage 5, Philippe Poirier DNR | 15 |

== See also ==
- 1988 Individual Ice Speedway World Championship
- 1988 Speedway World Team Cup in classic speedway
- 1988 Individual Speedway World Championship in classic speedway
