= 1990 Team Ice Racing World Championship =

Seasons
- ← 1989 1991 →

The 1990 Team Ice Racing World Championship was the 12th edition of the Team World Championship. The final was held on 24/25 February 1990, in Alma-Ata in Kazakhstan in the Soviet Union. The Soviet Union won their tenth title.

== Final Classification ==
Pos	Riders	Pts
1	(Soviet Union) Nikolai Nischenko 27, Yuri Ivanov 34, Sergei Kasakov 25	86
2	(Sweden) Per-Olof Serenius 22, Sven Erik Bjöerklund 23, Stefan Svensson 7	52
3	(Germany) Michael Lang 8, Harald Baumann 22, Helmut Weber 20	50
4	(Czechoslovakia) Antonin Klatovsky 20, Stanislav Dyk 16, Bronislav Franc 10	46
5	(Finland) Erkki Aakko 2, Hannu Larronmaa 2, Peter Nybo 1	5

== Qualifying ==
- Inzell - 27/28 Jan

Pos	Riders	Pts
1	(Finland) Jarmo Hirvasoja 34, Peter Nybo 28, Hannu Larronmaa 12	74
2	(Germany) Helmut Weber 32, Harald Baumann 20, Michael Lang 20	72
3	(Czechoslovakia) Stanislav Dyk 20, Antonin Klatovsky 18, Bronislav Franc 15	53
4	(Austria) Erwin Walch 11, Anton Horl 10, Walter Wartbichler 4	25
5	(Netherlands) Robert Jan Munnecom 7, Tjitte Bootsma 6, Wiebe Vochteloo 3	16

== See also ==
- 1990 Individual Ice Speedway World Championship
- 1990 Speedway World Team Cup in classic speedway
- 1990 Individual Speedway World Championship in classic speedway
