= 1994 Team Ice Racing World Championship =

Seasons
- ← 1993 1995 →

The 1994 Team Ice Racing World Championship was the 16th edition of the Team World Championship. The final was held on 26/27 February 1994, in Karlstad, in Sweden.

Russia won the title.

== Final Classification ==
Pos	Riders	Pts
1	(Russia) Alexander Balashov 27(10+17), Vladimir Fadeev 25(14+11), Valeri Ivanov 25(12+13)	77
2	(Sweden) Per-Olof Serenius 35(18+17), Stefan Svensson 30(16+14), Sven Erik Bjorklund 10(6+4)	75
3	(Germany) Michael Lang 27(15+12), Georg Landenhamer 13(7+6), Gunther Bauer 0(0+dnr)	40
4	(Kazakhstan) Stanislav Kuznetsov 13(9+4), Nikolaj Popov 8(6+2), Vladimir Cheblakov 4(0+4)	25
5	(Netherlands) Robert Jan Munnecom 13, Jan De Pruis 9(5+4), Tjitte Bootsma 0(0+dnr)	25

== See also ==
- 1994 Individual Ice Speedway World Championship
- 1994 Speedway World Team Cup in classic speedway
- 1994 Individual Speedway World Championship in classic speedway
