= 1992 Team Ice Racing World Championship =

Seasons
- ← 1991 1993 →

The 1992 Team Ice Racing World Championship was the 14th edition of the Team World Championship. The final was held on 8/9 February, 1992, in Oulu, Finland. The Soviet Union had disbanded and raced as the Commonwealth of Independent States.

== Final classification ==
Pos	Riders	Pts
1	(Commonwealth of Independent States) Valeri Martemianov 20(14 +16), Alexander Balashov 28(12 +16), Yuri Ivanov 24(14 +10)	62
2	(Sweden) Per-Olof Serenius 25 (11+14), John Frederiksson 20 (6+14), Ola Westlund 11 (5+6)	56
3	(Germany) Michael Lang 27(17+10), Thomas Diehr 14(10+4), Ulrich Wehrle 10(2+8)	51
4	(Finland) Jarmo Hirvasoja 17(12+5), Aki Ala Riihimaki 16(9+7), Jari Moisio 2(1+1)	35
5	(Czech Republic) Antonin Klatovsky 10(3+7), Bronislav Franc 3(2+1), Stanislav Dyk 0(0+0)	13

== Semi-finals ==
=== Gallio ===
Gallio, Veneto - 18/19 January

Pos	Riders	Pts
1	(Commonwealth of Independent States) Oleg Khomich 32, Vladimir Sukhov 29, Nikola Nischenko 23	84
2	(Czech Republic) Antonin Klatovsky 27, Bronislav Franc 24, Slanislav Dyk 19	70
3	(Italy) Fabrizio Vesprini 20, Remo Dal Bosco 18, Luca Ravagnari 15	53
4	(Austria) Erwin Walch 14, Anton Horl 8, Franz Schiefer 8	30
5	(France) Phillipe Poirier 3, Laurent Sambarrey 0, Christophe Faure 0	3

=== Karlstad ===
Karlstad - 25/26 January

Pos	Riders	Pts
1	(Sweden) Per-Olof Serenius 35(17+18), Ola Westlund 30(17+13), Sven Erik Bjorklund 9(dnr+9)	74
2	(Germany) Michael Lang 32(16+16), Thomas Diehr 21(13+8), Ulrich Wehrle 17(6+11)	70
3	(Netherlands) Wiebe Vochteloo 22(11+11), Tjitte Bootsma 21(11+10), Robert Jan Munnecom 8(6+2)	51
4	(Norway) Stig Inge Bergersen 14(9+5), Geir Liletvedt 14(6+8), Per Jorgensen 4(1+3)	32
5	(United Kingdom) John Walmsley 4(2+2), Steve Smith 4(1+3), Graham Halsall 0(0+0)	8

== See also ==
- 1992 Individual Ice Speedway World Championship
- 1992 Speedway World Team Cup in classic speedway
- 1992 Individual Speedway World Championship in classic speedway
