= 1989 Team Ice Racing World Championship =

Seasons
- ← 1988 1990 →

The 1989 Team Ice Racing World Championship was the 11th edition of the Team World Championship. The final was held on 12/13 March 1989, in Assen in the Netherlands.

The Soviet Union won their ninth title.

== Classification ==
Pos	Riders	Pts
1	(Soviet Union) Nikolai Nischenko 22, Vitali Russkich 21, Yuri Ivanov 21	64
2	(Sweden) Erik Stenlund 32, Sven-Erik Björklund 17, Per Olof Serenius 12	61
3	(Czechoslovakia) Bronislav Franc 8, Antonin Klatovsky 22, Stanislav Dyk 16	46
4	(Finland) Jarmo Hirvasoja 25, Peter Nybo 10, Erkki Aakko 10	45
5	(Netherlands) Tjitte Bootsma 13, Robert-Jan Munnecom 8, Gerrit Rook 3	24

== See also ==
- 1989 Individual Ice Speedway World Championship
- 1989 Speedway World Team Cup in classic speedway
- 1989 Individual Speedway World Championship in classic speedway
