= 1993 Team Ice Racing World Championship =

Seasons
- ← 1992 1994 →

The 1993 Team Ice Racing World Championship was the 15th edition of the Team World Championship. The final was held on 6/7 March, 1993, in Assen, in the Netherlands. Russia won the title.

== Final classification ==
Pos	Riders	Pts
1	(Russia) Vladimir Fadeev 16(11+5), Alexander Balashov 35(18+17), Valeri Ivanov 14(8+6)	75
2	(Sweden) Stefan Svensson 24(14+10), Per-Olof Serenius 27(17+10), Ola Westlund 15(5+10)	66
3	(Netherlands) Robert-Jan Munnecom 15(9+6), Tjitte Bootsma 17(7+10), Anne van der Helm 15(7+9)	48
4	(Germany) Michael Lang 23 (14+9), Helmut Weber 5(2+3), Harald Baumann 2(1+1)	30
5	(Italy) Luca Ravagnani 8(3+5), Remo Dal Bosco 7(3+4), Fabrizio Vesprini 3(0+3)	18

== Semi-finals ==
=== Berlin ===
Berlin - 6/7 Feb

Pos	Riders	Pts
1	(Russia) Alexander Balashov 31(17+14), Sergei Ivanov 27(14+13), Juri Ivanov 21(11+10)	79
2	(Germany) Michael Lang 32(14+18), Harald Baumann 25(13+12), Helmut Weber 14(5+9)	71
3	(Finland) Jarmo Hirvasoja 32(18 +14), Jari Ahlbom 18(9+9), Jari Moisio 14(5+9)	64
4	(Norway) Per Jorgensen 9(5+4), Geir Lilletvedt 7(4+3), Stig Inge Bergersen 2 (2+0)	18
5	(United Kingdom) Bruce Cribb 3(1+2), Steve Smith 0 (0 +dnr), Graham Halsall dnr	4

=== Gallio ===
Gallio, Veneto - 6/7 Feb

Pos	Riders	Pts
1	(Sweden) Per-Olof Serenius 27(12+15), Ola Westlund 25(15+10), Stefan Svensson 25(14+11)	77
2	(Italy) Luca Ravagnani 29(13+16), Remo Dal Bosco 26(13+13), Fabrizio Vesprini 15(6+9)	70
3	(Austria) Harald Simon 25(11+14), Franz Schiefer 17(12+5), Joachim Wartbichler 3(2+1)	45
4	(Czech Republic) Jiri Petrasek 14(5+9), Stanislav Dyk 10(5+5), Martin Patak 8(2+6)	32
5	(Switzerland) Beny Winiger 11(6+5), Gottfried Dahinden 5(4+1), Hans Hafner 0(0+dnr)	16

== See also ==
- 1993 Individual Ice Speedway World Championship
- 1993 Speedway World Team Cup in classic speedway
- 1993 Individual Speedway World Championship in classic speedway
