= 1982 Team Ice Racing World Championship =

1982 championship event

Seasons
- ← 1981 1983 →

The 1982 Team Ice Racing World Championship was the fourth edition of the Team World Championship. The final was held on 27/28 February 1982, in Kalinin (Tver) in the Soviet Union.

The title was won by the Soviet Union.

== Classification ==
| Pos | Riders | Pts |
|---|---|---|
| 1 | (Soviet Union) Sergei Kasakov 22, Vladimir Lioubitch 17, Vladimir Suchov 18 | 57 |
| 2 | (Czechoslovakia) Zdeněk Kudrna 22, Milan Špinka 26, Jiri Svoboda DNR | 48 |
| 3 | (Sweden) Hans Johansson 11, Per-Olof Serenius 14, Erik Stenlund 16 | 41 |
| 4 | (Finland) Timo Sinkkonen 2, Jukka Rauman 3, Jarmo Hirvasoja 23 | 28 |
| 5 | (Austria) Kurt Wartbichler 17, Walter Wartbichler 10, Franz Schiefer 1 | 28 |
| 6 | (West Germany) Max Niedermaier 19, Helmut Weber 8, Albert Stickl DNR | 27 |
| 7 | (Netherlands) Roelof Thijs 22, Andre Stroel 1, Peet Pieters 0 | 23 |

== See also ==
- 1982 Individual Ice Speedway World Championship
- 1982 Speedway World Team Cup in classic speedway
- 1982 Individual Speedway World Championship in classic speedway
