= 1991 Team Ice Racing World Championship =

Ice speedway event

Seasons
- ← 1990 1992 →

The 1991 Team Ice Racing World Championship was the 13th edition of the Team World Championship. The final was held on 2 and 3 February 1991, in Inzell in Germany. The Soviet Union won their 11th title.

== Final Classification ==
Pos	Riders	Pts
1	(Soviet Union) Nikolai Nischenko 23, Yuri Ivanov 27, Sergei Ivanov 27	77
2	(Czechoslovakia) Bronislav Franc 22, Stanislav Dyk 18, Antonin Klatovsky 23	63
3	(Sweden) Per-Olof Serenius 19, John Fredriksson 12, Sven Erik Björklund 23	54
4	(Germany) Michael Lang 21, Helmut Weber 10, Harald Baumann 7	38
5	(Finland) Jari Ahlbom 7, Anssi Lehtinen 0, Iilla Perttunen 0	7

== Qualifying ==
- Oulu - 26/27 Jan

Pos	Riders	Pts
1	(Czechoslovakia) Antonin Klatovsky 31, Bronislav Franc 23, Stanislav Dyk 22	76
2	(Sweden) Sven Erik Bjorklund 29, Per Olov Serenius 23, John Fredriksson 14	66
3	(Finland) Jari Ahlbom 17, Jarmo Hirvasoja 12, Erikki Aakko 7	34
4	(Austria) Franz Schiefer 11, Anton Hörl 10, Erwin Walch 10	31
5	(Netherlands) Robert Jan Munnecom 17, Tjitte Bootsma 10, Wiebe Vochteloo 3	30

== See also ==
- 1991 Individual Ice Speedway World Championship
- 1991 Speedway World Team Cup in classic speedway
- 1991 Individual Speedway World Championship in classic speedway
