= 1986 Team Ice Racing World Championship =

Seasons
- ← 1985 1987 →

The 1986 Team Ice Racing World Championship was the eighth edition of the Team World Championship. The final was held on 22nd/23rd February 1986, in Leningrad in the Soviet Union. The Soviet Union won their sixth title.

== Classification ==
Pos	Riders	Pts
1	(Soviet Union) Vasili Afanasiev 18, Yuri Ivanov 30, Vladimir Suchov 29	77
2	(Sweden) Jan Sigurd 23, Tommy Lindgren 19, Per-Olof Serenius 17	59
3	(West Germany) Helmut Weber 20, Leonhard Oswald 17, Max Niedermaier Sr. 9	46
4	(Finland) Jarmo Hirvasoja 19, Erkki Aakko 12, Jarmo Reima 10	41
5	(Netherlands) Christian Reit 8, Johan Last 5, Gerrit Rook 4	17

== See also ==
- 1986 Individual Ice Speedway World Championship
- 1986 Speedway World Team Cup in classic speedway
- 1986 Individual Speedway World Championship in classic speedway
