= 1987 Team Ice Racing World Championship =

Seasons
- ← 1986 1988 →

The 1987 Team Ice Racing World Championship was the ninth edition of the Team World Championship. The final was held on 7th/8th March 1987, in Heerenveen in the Netherlands.

The Soviet Union won their seventh title.

== Classification ==
Pos	Riders	Pts
1	(Soviet Union) Yuri Ivanov 26, Sergei Ivanov 20, Vladimir Suchov 28	74
2	(Sweden) Hans Johansson 18, Per-Olof Serenius 23, Jan Sigurd 15	56
3	(West Germany) Helmut Weber 28, Leonard Oswald 17, Michael Neumaier 4	49
4	(Finland) Peter Nybo 18, Hannu Larronmaa 9, Jarmo Hirvasoja 4	31
5	(Netherlands) Gerrit Rook 20, Johan Last 3, Christian Reit 1	24

== See also ==
- 1987 Individual Ice Speedway World Championship
- 1987 Speedway World Team Cup in classic speedway
- 1987 Individual Speedway World Championship in classic speedway
