= 1983 Team Ice Racing World Championship =

Seasons
- ← 1982 1984 →

The 1983 Team Ice Racing World Championship was the fifth edition of the Team World Championship. The final was held on 12/13 March 1983, in Wilmersdorf, West Berlin in West Germany. West Germany won their first title ending a run of four consecutive victories for the Soviet Union.

== Classification ==
Pos	Riders	Pts
1	(West Germany) Max Niedermaier 29, Helmut Weber 26, Gunther Brandt dnr	55
2	(Sweden) Erik Stenlund 32, Per-Olov Serenius 20, Hans Johansson 2	54
3	(Soviet Union) Sergei Kasakov 15, Vladimir Suchov 23, Anatoli Bondarenko 8	46
4	(Czechoslovakia) Jira Svoboda 18, Stanislav Dyk 9, Milan Spinka 5	32
5	(Netherlands) Roelof Thijs 21, Peet Pieters 3, Wiebe Oldenburger 0	24
6	(Finland) Jarmo Hirvasoja 10, Timo Sinkkonen 9, Jukka Rauman 3	22
7	(Austria) Walter Wartbichler 12, Treumund Strobl 6, Franz Schiefer 0	18

== See also ==
- 1983 Individual Ice Speedway World Championship
- 1983 Speedway World Team Cup in classic speedway
- 1983 Individual Speedway World Championship in classic speedway
