= 1993 Individual Ice Speedway World Championship =

Seasons
- ← 1992 1994 →

The 1993 Individual Ice Speedway World Championship was the 28th edition of the World Championship The Championship was held on 20 and 21 February 1993 in Saransk in Russia.

== Classification ==
Pos	Rider	Pts
1	(Russia) Vladimir Fadeyev	27
2	(Russia) Alexander Balashov	25
3	(Germany) Michael Lang	23
4	(Russia) Valery Ivanov	22
5	(Sweden) Stefan Svensson	20
6	(Sweden) Per-Olof Serenius	17
7	(Finland) Jarmo Hirvasoja	17
8	(Sweden) Ola Westlund	15
9	(Sweden) John Fredriksson	14
10	(Russia) Vyacheslav Nikulin	13
11	(Russia) Yuri Ivanov	12
12	(Russia) Vladimir Cheblakov	11
13	(Italy) Luca Ravagnani	9
14	(Netherlands) Anne van der Helm	7
15	(Switzerland) Benny Wininger	6
16	(Austria) Franz Schiefer	1

== See also ==
- 1993 Individual Speedway World Championship in classic speedway
- 1993 Team Ice Racing World Championship
