= 1992 Individual Ice Speedway World Championship =

Motorcycle ice speedway race

Seasons
- ← 1991 1993 →

The 1992 Individual Ice Speedway World Championship was the 27th edition of the World Championship The Championship was held on 7/8 March, 1992 in Frankfurt in Germany.

Yuri Ivanov riding under the banner of the Commonwealth of Independent States (due to the Dissolution of the Soviet Union) won her third world title.

== Classification ==
| Pos | Rider | Pts |
|---|---|---|
| 1 | (Commonwealth of Independent States) Yuri Ivanov | 28 |
| 2 | (Czechoslovakia) Antonin Klatovsky | 22 |
| 3 | (Sweden) Stefan Svensson | 21 |
| 4 | (Commonwealth of Independent States) Alexander Balashov | 21 |
| 5 | (Sweden) Per-Olof Serenius | 19 |
| 6 | (Commonwealth of Independent States) Vladimir Fedeev | 17 |
| 7 | (Commonwealth of Independent States) Vladimir Sukhov | 17 |
| 8 | (Sweden) Ola Westlund | 17 |
| 9 | (Sweden) John Fredriksson | 15 |
| 10 | (Finland) Aki Ali-Riihimäki | 13 |
| 11 | (Commonwealth of Independent States) Nikolai Nishchenko | 11 |
| 12 | (Italy) Luca Ravagnani | 9 |
| 13 | (Commonwealth of Independent States) Sergei Ivanov | 8 |
| 14 | (Netherlands) Robert-Jan Munnecom (res) | 8 |
| 15 | (Germany) Ulrich Wehrle | 5 |
| 16 | (Germany) Helmut Weber (res) | 5 |
| 17 | (Norway) Stig-Inge Bergersen | 1 |
| 18 | (Germany) Michael Lang | 0 |

== See also ==
- 1992 Individual Speedway World Championship in classic speedway
- 1992 Team Ice Racing World Championship
