= 2001 Individual Ice Speedway World Championship =

Motorcycle ice speedway race

Seasons
- ← 2000 2002 →

The 2001 Individual Ice Speedway World Championship was the 36th edition of the World Championship The Championship was held as a Grand Prix series over eight rounds.

Kirilł Drogalin won his third world title.

== Classification ==
Pos	Rider	Pts
1	(Russia) Kirilł Drogalin	
2	(Russia) Vladimir Fadeev	
3	(Russia) Vjatjeslav Nikulin	
4	(Austria) Franz Zorn	
5	(Russia) Vitaly Khomitsevich	
6	(Russia) Juri Polikarpov	
7	(Czech Republic) Antonin Klatovsky	
8	(Russia) Alexander Moskowka	
9	(Finland) Antti Aakko	
10	(Russia) Valeri Ivanov	
11	(Sweden) Per-Olof Serenius	
12	(Russia) Maxim Baraboschkin	
13	(Russia) Valeri Perzew	
14	(Russia) Alexander Balashov	
15	(Germany) Jürgen Liebmahn	
16	(Austria) Markus Skabraut	
17	(Sweden) Ola Westlund	
18	(Finland) Jari Ahlbom	
19	(Netherlands) Tjitte Bootsma	

== See also ==
- 2001 Speedway Grand Prix in classic speedway
- 2001 Team Ice Racing World Championship
