= 1997 Individual Ice Speedway World Championship =

Motorcycle ice speedway race

Seasons
- ← 1996 1998 →

The 1997 Individual Ice Speedway World Championship was the 32nd edition of the World Championship The final was held on 8/9 March 1997 in Assen in the Netherlands.

Kirilł Drogalin of Russia won the world title.

== Classification ==
Pos	Rider	Pts
1	(Russia) Kirilł Drogalin	
2	(Russia) Alexander Balashov	
3	(Finland) Jari Ahlbom	
4	(Sweden) Stefan Svensson	
5	(Russia) Vladimir Fadeev	
6	(Sweden) Per-Olof Serenius	
7	(Russia) Juri Polikarpov	
8	(Belarus) Oleg Chomitsch	
9	(Russia) Vladimir Lumpov	
10	(Germany) Michael Lang	
11	(Netherlands) Tjitte Bootsma	
12	(Germany) Günter Bauer	
13	(Belarus) Igor Jakowlev	
14	(Czech Republic) Antonin Klatovsky	
15	(Belarus) Viktor Sidorenko	
16	(Kazakhstan) Vladimir Cheblakov	

== See also ==
- 1997 Speedway Grand Prix in classic speedway
- 1997 Team Ice Racing World Championship
