= 2000 FIM Team Ice Racing World Championship =

Ice speedway event

Ice Speedway of Nations
- Location: Berlin, Germany
- Start date: 26 February 2000
- End date: 27 February 2000

The 2000 FIM Team Ice Racing World Championship was the 22nd edition of the Team World Championship. The final was held from 26 to 27 February 2000, in Berlin, in Germany.

Russia won the title for the fifth successive year.

== Final Classification ==
Pos	Riders	Pts
1	(Russia) Vladimir Fadeev 21 (10+11), Juri Polikarpov 17 (9+8), Kirilł Drogalin 17 (8+9)	55
2	(Finland) Aki Ala Riihimäki 17 (9+8), Antti Aakko 16 (10+6), Jari Ahlbom 11 (4+7)	44
3	(Sweden) Per-Olof Serenius 17 (5+12), Stefan Svensson 14 (11+3), Lasse Jansson 12 (5+7)	43
4	(Austria) Franz Zorn 22 (11+11), Harald Simon 11 (5+6), Markus Skabraut 4 (1+3)	37
5	(Germany) Jürgen Liebmann 13 (7+6), Günther Bauer 7 (7+dnr), Markus Schwaiger 7 (5+2)	27
6	(Netherlands) Tjitte Bootsma 15 (5+10), Gerrit Rook 5 (3+2), Rene Verhoef 2 (2+0)	22
7	(Czech Republic) Stanislav Dyk 12 (7+5), Jaromir Lach 6 (4+2), Jiri Petrasek 3 (0+3)	21

== See also ==
- 2000 Individual Ice Speedway World Championship
