= 1997 Team Ice Racing World Championship =

Ice speedway event

Ice Speedway of Nations
- Location: Berlin, Germany
- Start date: 1 March 1997
- End date: 2 March 1997

The 1997 Team Ice Racing World Championship was the 19th edition of the Team World Championship. The final was held on 1/2 March 1997, in Berlin, in Germany.

Russia won the title.

== Final classification ==
Pos	Riders	Pts
1	(Russia) Alexander Balashov 29, Kirilł Drogalin 27, Maxim Baraboshkin 4	60
2	(Sweden) Stefan Svensson 27, Per-Olof Serenius 19, Lars Olov Jansson 1	47
3	(Finland) Jari Ahlblom 26, Aki Ala Riihimaki 6, Seppo Siira 2	34
4	(Kazakhstan) Stanislav Kuznetsov 24, Vladimir Teheblokov 9, Nail Galiakberov 0	33
5	(Germany) Michael Lang 15, Gunther Bauer 15, Jurgen Liebmann 2	32
6	(Czech Republic) Antonin Klatovsky 20, Jiri Petrasek 5, Martin Pateko 0	25
7	(Netherlands) Tjiite Bootsma 17, Gerrit Rook 2, Jan De Pruis 1	20

== Semi-final ==
Saransk - 18/19 Jan

Pos	Riders	Pts
1	(Russia) Alexander Balashov 30, Jiri Polakarpov 29, Kiryl Dragalin 22	81
2	(Netherlands) Tjiite Bootsma 26, Gerrit Rook 10, Jan De Pruis 9	45
3	(Czech Republic) Jiri Petrasek 21, Antontin Klatovsky 18, Martin Patak 3	42
4	(Austria) Harald Simon 16, Franz Zorn 15, Thomas Kainz 8	39
5	(Belarus) Viktor Sidorenko 17, Oleg Chomic 15, Leonid Taranov 1	33

== See also ==
- 1997 Individual Ice Speedway World Championship
- 1997 Speedway World Team Cup in classic speedway
- 1997 Speedway Grand Prix in classic speedway
