= 1990 Individual Ice Speedway World Championship =

Motorcycle ice speedway race

Seasons
- ← 1989 1991 →

The 1990 Individual Ice Speedway World Championship was the 25th edition of the World Championship The Championship was held on 10 and 11 March 1990 at the Ruddalen in Gothenburg in Sweden.

Jarmo Hirvasoja became the first rider from Finland to take a World title in any discipline of speedway. Sergei Ivanov defeated Per-Olof Serenius in the race off for the bronze medal.

== Classification ==
Pos	Rider	Pts
1	(Finland) Jarmo Hirvasoja	27
2	(Soviet Union) Nikolai Nishchenko	24
3	(Soviet Union) Sergei Ivanov	23
4	(Sweden) Per-Olof Serenius	23
5	(Soviet Union) Sergey Kazakov	21
6	(West Germany) Michael Lang	19
7	(Soviet Union) Igor Yakovlev	17
8	(Czechoslovakia) Stanislav Dyk	15
9	(Czechoslovakia) Bronislav Franc	14
10	(West Germany) Helmut Weber	12
11	(Soviet Union) Yuri Ivanov	11
12	(Sweden) Sven-Erik Björklund	10
13	(Sweden) Stefan Svensson	9
14	(Czechoslovakia) Antonin Klatovsky	6
15	(West Germany) Harald Bauman	3
16	(Netherlands) Robert-Jan Munnecom	3
17	(Sweden) Eskil Jonsson	2

== See also ==
- 1990 Individual Speedway World Championship in classic speedway
- 1990 Team Ice Racing World Championship
