= 1986 Individual Ice Speedway World Championship =

Motorcycle ice speedway race

Seasons
- ← 1985 1987 →

The 1986 Individual Ice Speedway World Championship was the 21st edition of the World Championship The Championship was held on ?, 1986 in Stockholm in Sweden.

The winner was Yuri Ivanov of the Soviet Union.

== Classification ==
Pos	Rider	Pts
1	(Soviet Union) Yuri Ivanov	29
2	(Soviet Union) Vladimir Sukhov	27
3	(Sweden) Erik Stenlund	25
4	(Soviet Union) Sergei Ivanov	23
5	(Soviet Union) Vitali Russkikh	20
6	(Sweden) Tommy Lindgren	17
7	(Sweden) Per-Olof Serenius	16
8	(Finland) Jarmo Hirvasoja	13
9	(Sweden) Jan Sigurd	13
10	(Soviet Union) Wassili Afanasyev	12
11	(Soviet Union) Juri Smirnov	11
12	(Czechoslovakia) Jiri Svoboda	10
13	(Finland) Hannu Larronmaa	7
14	(Sweden) Eskil Jonsson	5
15	(Czechoslovakia) Stanislav Dyk	4
16	(West Germany) Helmut Weber	3
17	(West Germany) Leonard Oswald (res)	2
18	(Czechoslovakia) Roman Matoušek (res)	2

== See also ==
- 1986 Individual Speedway World Championship in classic speedway
- 1986 Team Ice Racing World Championship
