= 1996 Individual Ice Speedway World Championship =

Motorcycle ice speedway race

Seasons
- ← 1995 1997 →

The 1996 Individual Ice Speedway World Championship was the 31st edition of the World Championship. The Championship was held as a Grand Prix series over ten rounds.

Alexander Balashov of Russia won his second World title.

== Classification ==
Pos	Rider	Pts
1	(Russia) Alexander Balashov	
2	(Russia) Juri Polikarpov	
3	(Russia) Vyacheslav Nikulin	
4	(Russia) Vladimir Fadeev	
5	(Russia) Vladimir Lumpov	
6	(Sweden) Per-Olof Serenius	
7	(Sweden) Stefan Svensson	
8	(Germany) Michael Lang	
9	(Russia) Kirilł Drogalin	
10	(Belarus) Igor Jakowlev	
11	(Kazakhstan) Nail Galiakberov	
12	(Russia) Valeri Ivanov	
13	(Kazakhstan) Stanislav Kuznetsov	
14	(Finland) Jari Ahlbom	
15	(Sweden) Ola Westlund	
16	(Czech Republic) Antonin Klatovsky	
17	(Sweden) Jim Andersson	
18	(Austria) Harald Simon	
19	(Germany) Günter Bauer	

== See also ==
- 1996 Speedway Grand Prix in classic speedway
- 1996 Team Ice Racing World Championship
