= 1984 Individual Ice Speedway World Championship =

Ice speedway championship

Seasons
- ← 1983 1985 →

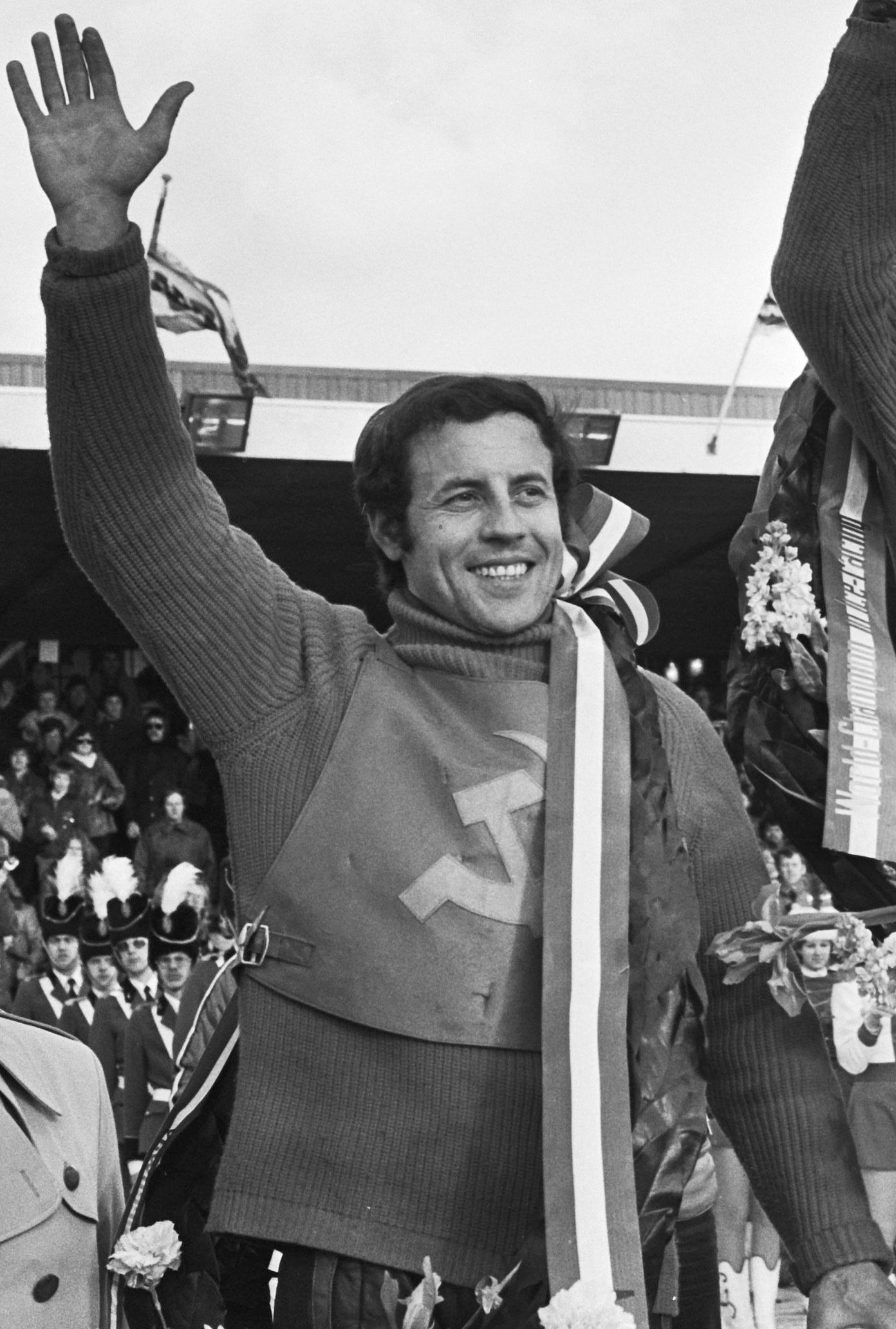
Anatoly Gladyshev (pictured in 1978) was killed during heat 23

The 1984 Individual Ice Speedway World Championship was the 19th edition of the World Championship The Championship was held on 17 and 18 February 1984 at the Lenin Stadium in Moscow in the Soviet Union.

The winner was Erik Stenlund of the Sweden. This was the first time since 1974 when the Championship was won by a rider not representing the Soviet Union.

Anatoly Gladyshev was killed during the 23rd heat of the second day. After colliding with Vitaly Russkikh he fell into the path of Walter Wartbichler who ran over him. He suffered an artery rupture caused by the front tyre of the bike and died later in hospital.

== Classification ==
Pos	Rider	Pts
1	(Sweden) Erik Stenlund	29
2	(Soviet Union) Vladimir Sukhov	28
3	(Soviet Union) Yuri Ivanov	27
4	(Soviet Union) Vitali Russkikh	22
5	(Netherlands) Roelof Thijs	20
6	(Germany) Helmut Weber	
7	(Finland) Jarmo Hirvasoja	16
8	(Germany) Günter Brandt	
9	(Soviet Union) Valeri Ivanschenko	
10	(Sweden) Per-Olof Serenius	
11	(Germany) Max Niedermaier	7
12	(Austria) Walter Wartbichler	
13	(Soviet Union) Alexander Smyshiliaev	6
14	(Soviet Union) Anatoly Gladyshev	
15	(Czechoslovakia) Václav Verner	
16	(Italy) Valentino Furlanetto	
17	(Germany) Stanislav Dyk (res)	
18	(Sweden) Eskil Jonsson (res)	

== See also ==
- 1984 Individual Speedway World Championship in classic speedway
- 1984 Team Ice Racing World Championship
