= 1985 Individual Ice Speedway World Championship =

Motorcycle ice speedway race

Seasons
- ← 1984 1986 →

The 1985 Individual Ice Speedway World Championship was the 20th edition of the World Championship The Championship was held on 9 and 10 March 1985 in Assen in the Netherlands.

The winner was Vladimir Sukhov of the Soviet Union.Yuri Ivanov defeated former champion Erik Stenlund in the run-off for bronze.

== Classification ==
| Pos | Rider | Pts |
|---|---|---|
| 1 | (Soviet Union) Vladimir Sukhov | 28 |
| 2 | (Finland) Jarmo Hirvasoja | 26 |
| 3 | (Soviet Union) Yuri Ivanov | 25 |
| 4 | (Sweden) Erik Stenlund | 25 |
| 5 | (Germany) Helmut Weber | |
| 6 | (Soviet Union) Sergei Ivanov | |
| 7 | (Soviet Union) Vladimir Posrednikov | |
| 8 | (Sweden) Jan Sigurd | |
| 9 | (Czechoslovakia) Jan Verner | |
| 10 | (Sweden) Per-Olof Serenius | |
| 11 | (Soviet Union) Vladimir Lioubich | |
| 12 | (Austria) Franz Schiefer | |
| 13 | (Germany) Max Niedermaier | |
| 14 | (Finland) Jorma Raima | |
| 15 | (Soviet Union) Sergey Kazakov | |
| 16 | (Netherlands) Christian Reit | |
| 17 | (Sweden) Tommy Lindgren | |
| 18 | (Austria) Walter Wartbichler | |

== See also ==
- 1985 Individual Speedway World Championship in classic speedway
- 1985 Team Ice Racing World Championship
