= 1988 Individual Ice Speedway World Championship =

Motorcycle ice speedway race

Seasons
- ← 1987 1989 →

The 1988 Individual Ice Speedway World Championship was the 23rd edition of the World Championship The Championship was held on 12 and 13 March 1988 in Eindhoven in the Netherlands.

The winner was Erik Stenlund of Sweden for the second time. He beat Yuri Ivanov by two points to stop Ivanov from claiming a third consecutive title.

== Classification ==
Pos	Rider	Pts
1	(Sweden) Erik Stenlund	29
2	(Soviet Union) Yuri Ivanov	27
3	(Soviet Union) Sergei Ivanov	24
4	(Soviet Union) Sergey Kazakov	
5	(Soviet Union) Vitali Russkikh	
6	(Soviet Union) Rais Mustafin	
7	(Sweden) Sven-Erik Björklund	
8	(Sweden) Per-Olof Serenius	
9	(Sweden) Jan Sigurd	
10	(Sweden) Tommy Lindgren	
11	(Czechoslovakia) Antonin Klatovsky	
12	(Sweden) Hans Johansson	
13	(Soviet Union) Wassily Afanasyev	
14	(Finland) Jarmo Hirvasoja	
15	(Netherlands) Gerrit Rook	
16	(New Zealand) Bruce Cribb	
17	(Germany) Helmut Weber	

== See also ==
- 1988 Individual Speedway World Championship in classic speedway
- 1988 Team Ice Racing World Championship
