= 1989 Individual Ice Speedway World Championship =

(1989) Ice Speedway Championship Alma Ata

Seasons
- ← 1988 1990 →

The 1989 Individual Ice Speedway World Championship was the 24th edition of the World Championship The Championship was held on the first weekend in March, 1989 in the Medeu stadium in Alma Ata, Kazakhstan in the Soviet Union.

The winner was Nikolai Nichenko of the Soviet Union.

== Classification ==
Pos	Rider	Pts
1	(Soviet Union) Nikolai Nichenko	26
2	(Soviet Union) Yuri Ivanov	25
3	(Soviet Union) Vladimir Sukhov	23
4	(Soviet Union) Vitali Russkich	23
5	(Soviet Union) Sergei Ivanov	21
6	(Sweden) Per-Olof Serenius	19
7	(Soviet Union) Mikhail Duplev	17
8	(Sweden) Sven-Erik Björklund	14
9	(Czechoslovakia) Bronislav Franc	14
10	(West Germany) Harald Bauman	12
11	(Finland) Erkki Arkko	12
12	(Finland) Jarmo Hirvasoja	9
13	(Czechoslovakia) Franz Schiefer	9
14	(Finland) Peter Nybo	5
15	(Sweden) Stefan Svensson	4
16	(West Germany) Helmut Weber	2
17	(Czechoslovakia) Antonin Klatovsky (res)	2
18	(Czechoslovakia) Stanislav Dyk (res)	2

== See also ==
- 1989 Individual Speedway World Championship in classic speedway
- 1989 Team Ice Racing World Championship
