= 1983 Individual Ice Speedway World Championship =

Motorcycle ice speedway race

Seasons
- ← 1982 1984 →

The 1983 Individual Ice Speedway World Championship was the 18th edition of the World Championship. The Championship was held on 5 and 6 March 1983 at the Kunstijsbaan in Eindhoven in the Netherlands.

The winner was Sergey Kazakov of the Soviet Union for the second successive year.

== Classification ==
Pos	Rider	Pts
1	(Soviet Union) Sergey Kazakov	28+3
2	(Soviet Union) Anatoly Bondarenko	28+2
3	(Sweden) Erik Stenlund	24+3
4	(Soviet Union) Alexander Smyshiliaev	24+2
5	(Soviet Union) Anatoly Gladyshev	19
6	(Soviet Union) Vladimir Sukhov	18
7	(West Germany) Max Niedermaier	16
8	(Austria) Walter Wartbichler	16
9	(Sweden) Per-Olof Serenius	13
10	(Soviet Union) Vladimir Subbotin	13
11	(Sweden) Tony Persson	8
12	(Czechoslovakia) Stanislav Dyk	5
13	(Czechoslovakia) Günter Brandt (res)	5
14	(Czechoslovakia) Antonin Klatovsky	5
15	(Sweden) Conny Fastesson (res)	2
16	(Sweden) Eskil Jonsson	2
17	(West Germany) Helmut Weber	0

== See also ==
- 1983 Individual Speedway World Championship in classic speedway
- 1983 Team Ice Racing World Championship
