= Bruce Cribb =

New Zealand speedway rider

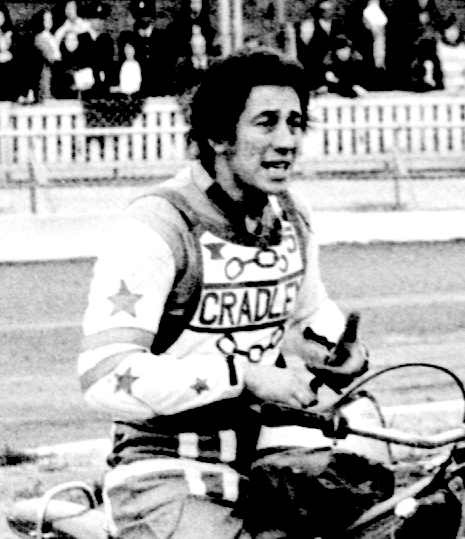
- Born: 27 June 1946 (age 80); Palmerston North, New Zealand
- Nationality: New Zealander

Career history
- 1965-1969: Poole Pirates
- 1970-1972, 1986-1988: Exeter Falcons
- 1973-1978: Cradley United/Heathens
- 1978: Bristol Bulldogs
- 1979-1981: Wolverhampton Wolves
- 1980: Oxford Cheetahs
- 1981-1983: Birmingham Brummies
- 1982-1985: Berwick Bandits
- 1984, 1986: Reading Racers

Individual honours
- 1972: New Zealand Champion

Team honours
- 1979: World Team Cup
- 1969: British League Champion

Bruce Brian Hoani Cribb (born 27 June 1946) is a former speedway rider from New Zealand, who rode in the United Kingdom for several teams in a career spanning over twenty years. He earned 22 international caps for the New Zealand national speedway team and 3 caps for Great Britain national speedway team.

== Career ==
Cribb was born in Palmerston North, where he began riding, before joining the Poole Pirates in the British leagues during 1965. In 1969 and 1970, he represented New Zealand in tests with England, and in 1971, he rode for Great Britain in matches with Poland. He won the New Zealand Championship in 1972.

After leaving Poole, Cribb rode for Exeter Falcons for three seasons. In 1973, he joined Cradley from Exeter but that same season suffered a triple fracture of the leg, which kept him out for a significant part of the season. He would however remain with Cradley for six years and become the club captain.

During the 1976, Cribb guested for Wolverhampton Wolves in the Midland Cup final. After a season with Bristol Bulldogs in 1978 he would later join Wolves from the 1979 season.

Cribb was a member of the New Zealand team that won the World Team Cup in 1979.

During the latter part of his career, Cribb rode for Birmingham Brummies and Berwick Bandits before finishing his career at Exeter.

== Ice speedway ==
From the 1970s to 1988, Cribb competed in ice speedway events and rode in two World ice speedway finals in 1978 and 1988.

== Personal life ==
Since retiring, Cribb had a speedway business which closed as he finally finished ice speedway, then worked in engineering (machine shop). Other work includes working as service manager in motorcycle shops, porting cylinder heads for car engine builders for road and race, then a motorcycle service repair, until retiring in 2010.

Cribb has three grown children in Sydney, Australia: two daughters, Justine and Danielle, a son, Krista, and three grandchildren, Chester, Scarlet and Keira. His long-term partner, Irene, died in 2015.

Cribb has written about racing in his book "Cribby Story Book" containing many anecdotes.

== Speedway World Final appearances ==
=== World Team Cup ===
- 1979 - (England) London, White City Stadium (with Ivan Mauger / Larry Ross / Mitch Shirra / Roger Abel) - Winner - 35pts (5)

=== Ice World Championship ===
- 1978 – (Netherlands) Assen, 18th
- 1988 (Netherlands) Eindhoven, 16th
