= 1994 Individual Ice Speedway World Championship =

Motorcycle ice speedway race

Seasons
- ← 1993 1995 →

The 1994 Individual Ice Speedway World Championship was the 29th edition of the World Championship The Championship was held as a Grand Prix series over ten rounds.

Alexander Balashov of Russia won his first World title.

== Classification ==
Pos	Rider	Pts
1	(Russia) Alexander Balashov	
2	(Sweden) Per-Olof Serenius	
3	(Russia) Vyacheslav Nikulin	
4	(Russia) Vladimir Fadeev	
5	(Russia) Valeri Ivanov	
6	(Germany) Michael Lang	
7	(Sweden) Stefan Svensson	
8	(Czech Republic) Antonin Klatovsky	
9	(Finland) Jarmo Hirvasoja	
10	(Netherlands) Robert-Jan Munnecom	
11	(Kazakhstan) Vladimir Cheblakov	
12	(Italy) Luca Ravagnani	
13	(Finland) Jari Ahlbom	
14	(Sweden) Ola Westlund	
15	(Sweden) John Fredriksson	
16	(Switzerland) Benny Wininger	
17	(Austria) Franz Schiefer	
18	(Sweden) Sven-Erik Björklund	

== See also ==
- 1994 Individual Speedway World Championship in classic speedway
- 1994 Team Ice Racing World Championship
