= Jarmo Hirvasoja =

Finnish speedway rider

Personal information
- Born: 4 September 1954 (age 72) Oulu, Finland

Sport
- Sport: Ice speedway
Medal record
Representing Finland
World championships
Bronze medal – third place	1984 Deventer	Team
Silver medal – second place	1985 Assen	Individual
Bronze medal – third place	1988 Grenoble	Team
Gold medal – first place	1990 Göteborg	Individual

Jarmo Hirvasoja (born 4 September 1954) is a former international speedway rider from Finland.

== Speedway career ==
Hirvasoja became a world champion after winning the gold medal at the Individual Ice Speedway World Championship in the 1990 Individual Ice Speedway World Championship.

Previously, Hirvasoja had won a silver medal in 1985 and two bronze medals at the Team Ice Racing World Championship.

== World final appearances ==
=== Ice World Championship ===
- 1984 (Soviet Union) Moscow, 7th 16pts
- 1985 (Netherlands) Assen, 2nd 26pts
- 1986 (Sweden) Stockholm, 8th 13pts
- 1988 (Netherlands) Eindhoven, 14th
- 1989 (Soviet Union) Almaty, 12th 9pts
- 1990 (Sweden) Gothenburg, champion 27pts
- 1993 (Russia) Saransk, 7th 17pts
- 1994 10 Rounds GP, 9th
- 1995 10 Rounds GP, 14th
