= 1982 Individual Ice Speedway World Championship =

Motorcycle ice speedway race

Seasons
- ← 1981 1983 →

The 1982 Individual Ice Speedway World Championship was the 17th edition of the World Championship. The Championship was held in Inzell in Germany.

The winner was Sergey Kazakov of the Soviet Union.

== Classification ==
Pos	Rider	Pts
1	(Soviet Union) Sergey Kazakov	28
2	(Sweden) Per-Olof Serenius	23
3	(Soviet Union) Vladimir Subbotin	22
4	(Czechoslovakia) Zdeněk Kudrna	
5	(Soviet Union) Vladimir Sukhov	
6	(Germany) Max Niedermaier	
7	(Soviet Union) Anatoly Gladyshev	
8	(Netherlands) Roelof Thijs	
9	(Soviet Union) Vladimir Lioubich	
10	(Czechoslovakia) Stanislav Dyk	
11	(Germany) Helmut Weber	
12	(Sweden) Sture Wattman	
13	(Soviet Union) Boris Bratchikov	
14	(Sweden) Hans Johansson	
15	(Sweden) Erik Stenlund	
16	(Austria) Walter Wartbichler	

== See also ==
- 1982 Individual Speedway World Championship in classic speedway
- 1982 Team Ice Racing World Championship
