= 1995 Individual Ice Speedway World Championship =

Motorcycle ice speedway race

Seasons
- ← 1994 1996 →

The 1995 Individual Ice Speedway World Championship was the 30th edition of the World Championship The Championship was held as a Grand Prix series over ten rounds.

== Classification ==
Pos	Rider	Pts
1	(Sweden) Per-Olof Serenius	
2	(Russia) Alexander Balashov	
3	(Russia) Vyacheslav Nikulin	
4	(Sweden) Stefan Svensson	
5	(Russia) Vladimir Fadeev	
6	(Russia) Kirilł Drogalin	
7	(Germany) Michael Lang	
8	(Kazakhstan) Stanislav Kuznetsov	
9	(Russia) Valeri Ivanov	
10	(Russia) Sergei Ivanov	
11	(Finland) Jari Ahlbom	
12	(Russia) Vladimir Lumpov	
13	(Czech Republic) Antonin Klatovsky	
14	(Finland) Jarmo Hirvasoja	
15	(Netherlands) Robert-Jan Munnecom	
16	(Czech Republic) Bronislav Franc	
17	(Russia) Yury Ivanov	
18	(Sweden) Ola Westlund	
19	(Germany) Georg Landenhammer	

== See also ==
- 1995 Speedway Grand Prix in classic speedway
- 1995 Team Ice Racing World Championship
