= 1987 Individual Ice Speedway World Championship =

Motorcycle ice speedway race

Seasons
- ← 1986 1988 →

The 1987 Individual Ice Speedway World Championship was the 22nd edition of the World Championship The Championship was held on 14 and 15 March 1987 in Wilmersdorf, West Berlin in West Germany.

The winner was Yuri Ivanov of the Soviet Union for the second time.

== Classification ==
Pos	Rider	Pts
1	(Soviet Union) Yuri Ivanov	28
2	(Soviet Union) Vladimir Sukhov	23
3	(Soviet Union) Vitali Russkikh	21
4	(Sweden) Jan Sigurd	21
5	(West Germany) Helmut Weber	
6	(Soviet Union) Sergei Sokolov	
7	(Sweden) Stefan Svensson	
8	(Sweden) Eskil Jonsson	
9	(Soviet Union) Rais Mustafin	
10	(Sweden) Hans Johansson	
11	(Sweden) Per-Olof Serenius	
12	(Czechoslovakia) Antonin Klatovsky	
13	(Czechoslovakia) Jiri Svoboda	
14	(Soviet Union) Sergei Ivanov	
15	(Czechoslovakia) Jan Pecina	
16	(West Germany) Leonard Oswald	
17	(Sweden) Roger Nordlund	
18	(Austria) Antonin Hörl	

== See also ==
- 1987 Individual Speedway World Championship in classic speedway
- 1987 Team Ice Racing World Championship
