= 1995 Team Ice Racing World Championship =

Ice speedway event

Ice Speedway of Nations
- Location: Frankfurt, Germany
- Start date: 25 February 1995
- End date: 26 February 1995

The 1995 Team Ice Racing World Championship was the 17th edition of the Team World Championship. The final was held on 25/26 February, 1995, in Frankfurt, in Germany.

Sweden won only their second ever title defeating Russia by one point.

== Final Classification ==
Pos	Riders	Pts
1	(Sweden) Per-Olof Serenius 26, Stefan Svensson 23, Ola Westlund 0(dnr)	49
2	(Russia) Kirilł Drogalin 22(13+9), Vladimir Fadeev 19(10+9), Valeri Ivanov 7(2+5)	48
3	(Kazakhstan) Stanislav Kuznetsov 28(12+16), Vladimir Cheblakov 9(5+4), Nail Galiakberov 0(0+0)	37
4	(Finland) Jarmo Hirvasoja 19(12+7), Jari Ahlbom 16(10+6), Seppo Siira 1(0+1)	36
5	(Germany) Michael Lang 22(10+12), Georg Landenhamer 13(6+7), Günther Bauer 0(0+0)	35
6	(Czech Republic) Antonin Klatovsky 17(10+7), Stanislav Dyk 11(4+7), Bronislav Franc 1(1+0)	29
7	(Netherlands) Robert Jan Munnecom 9(5+4), Tjitte Bootsma 9(3+6), Jan De Pruis 0(0+0)	18

== See also ==
- 1995 Individual Ice Speedway World Championship
- 1995 Speedway World Team Cup in classic speedway
- 1995 Speedway Grand Prix in classic speedway
