= 1991 Individual Ice Speedway World Championship =

Motorcycle ice speedway race

Seasons
- ← 1990 1992 →

The 1991 Individual Ice Speedway World Championship was the 26th edition of the World Championship, The Championship was held on 9/10 March 1991 in Assen in the Netherlands.

Sergei Ivanov won the world title defeating Per-Olof Serenius in a race off after both riders finished on 26 points.

== Classification ==
Pos	Rider	Pts
1	(Soviet Union) Sergei Ivanov	26
2	(Sweden) Per-Olof Serenius	26
3	(Germany) Michael Lang	24
4	(Soviet Union) Valeri Martemianov	23
5	(Sweden) Antonin Klatovsky	20
6	(Soviet Union) Vladimir Sukhov	17
7	(Sweden) Ola Westlund	17
8	(Sweden) Sven-Erik Björklund	17
9	(Soviet Union) Nikolai Nishchenko	13
10	(Sweden) Stefan Svensson	10
11	(Czechoslovakia) Stanislav Dyk	10
12	(Italy) Luca Ravagnani	9
13	(Soviet Union) Valeri Ivanov	8
14	(Netherlands) Wiebe Vochteloo	4
15	(Czechoslovakia) Bronislav Franc	4
16	(Germany) Ulrich Wehrle	1
17	(Germany) Harald Bauman	0

== See also ==
- 1991 Individual Speedway World Championship in classic speedway
- 1991 Team Ice Racing World Championship
