= Erik Stenlund =

Swedish speedway rider

- Born: 26 May 1962 (age 64); Uppsala, Sweden
- Nationality: Swedish

Career history

Sweden
- 1983–1987: Getingarna
- 1988–1989: Stockholm United
- 1990–2001: Rospiggarna

Great Britain
- 1983: Poole Pirates
- 1988: Swindon Robins
- 1996: Reading Racers

Individual honours
- 1985: Swedish Champion

Team honours
- 1983, 1985, 1989, 1995, 1997, 2001: Elitserien Champion
- 1994: Allsvenskan Winner

Medal record

Ice speedway

Representing Sweden

World championships
Bronze medal – third place	1983 Eindhoven	Individual
Gold medal – first place	1984 Moscow	Individual
Bronze medal – third place	1986 Stockholm	Individual
Gold medal – first place	1988 Eindhoven	Individual

Erik Stenlund (born 26 May 1962) is a Swedish former speedway rider. He earned 25 caps for the Sweden national speedway team.

== Speedway career ==
Stenlund is a two times world champion at the Individual Ice Speedway World Championship (1984He toured the UK with Rospiggarna in 1992. & 1988) and a former champion of Sweden, winning the Swedish Championship in 1985.

Stenlund rode in the top tier of British Speedway for three seasons, for Poole Pirates in 1983, Swindon Robins in 1988 (after missing their 1987 season) and for Reading Racers in 1996.

== World final appearances ==
=== World Team Cup ===
- 1986 – (Sweden) Gothenburg, Ullevi, (Denmark) Vojens, Speedway Center and (England) Bradford, Odsal Stadium (with Jan Andersson / Jimmy Nilsen / Per Jonsson / Tommy Nilsson / Tony Olsson) - 4th - 73pts (1)

=== World Longtrack Championship ===
- 1989 (Czech Republic) Mariánské Lázně 4th 28pts
- 1990 (Germany) Herxheim 7th 21pt
- 1991 (Czech Republic) Mariánské Lázně 14th 4pts
- 1993 (Germany) Mühldorf 17th 2pts

=== Ice World Championship ===
- 1981 (Netherlands) Assen 11th 9pts
- 1982 (West Germany) Inzell 15th
- 1983 (Netherlands) Eindhoven 3rd 24pts
- 1984 (Soviet Union) Moscowchampion 29pts
- 1985 (Netherlands) Assen 4th 25pts
- 1986 (Sweden) Stockholm 3rd 25pts
- 1988 (Netherlands) Eindhoven champion 29pts
