= Yuri Ivanov (speedway rider) =

Soviet speedway rider

Personal information
- Nationality: Russian
- Born: 2 July 1959 (age 67) Atkhatai, Buryat ASSR, Soviet Union

Sport
- Sport: Ice speedway
Medal record
Representing the Soviet Union
World championships
Bronze medal – third place	1984 Moscow	Individual
Bronze medal – third place	1985 Assen	Individual
Gold medal – first place	1986 Stockholm	Individual
Gold medal – first place	1986 Leningrad	Team
Gold medal – first place	1987 Berlin	Individual
Gold medal – first place	1987 Heerenveen	Team
Silver medal – second place	1988 Eindhoven	Individual
Gold medal – first place	1988 Grenoble	Team
Silver medal – second place	1989 Almaty	Individual
Gold medal – first place	1989 Assen	Team
Gold medal – first place	1990 Almaty	Team
Gold medal – first place	1991 Inzell	Team
Representing the CIS
Gold medal – first place	1992 Frankfurt	Individual
Gold medal – first place	1992 Oulu	Team

Yuri Leonidovich Ivanov (born 2 July 1959) is a former international speedway rider from the Soviet Union.

== Speedway career ==
Ivanov is a three times world champion after winning the gold medal at the Individual Ice Speedway World Championship in the 1986 Individual Ice Speedway World Championship, 1987 Individual Ice Speedway World Championship and 1992 Individual Ice Speedway World Championship.

In addition, Ivanov won the Team Ice Racing World Championship seven times (1986, 1987, 1988, 1989, 1990, 1991 and 1992).

== World final appearances ==
=== Ice World Championship ===
- 1984 (Soviet Union) Moscow, 3rd 27pts
- 1985 (Netherlands) Assen, 3rd 25pts
- 1986 (Sweden) Stockholm, champion 29pts
- 1987 (West Germany) Berlin, champion 28pts
- 1988 (Netherlands) Eindhoven, 2nd 27pts
- 1989 (Soviet Union) Almaty, 2nd 25pts
- 1990 (Sweden) Gothenburg, 11th 11pts
- 1991 (Netherlands) Assen, 2nd
- 1992 (Germany) Frankfurt, champion 28pts
- 1993 (Russia) Saransk, 11th 12pts
- 1995 10 Rounds GP, 17th
