= Ice Speedway of Nations =

International ice speedway competition

Tournament information
- Sport: Ice Speedway
- Established: 1979
- Administrator: Fédération Internationale de Motocyclisme (FIM)
- Website: official website

The FIM Ice Speedway of Nations, formerly known as the Ice Speedway Team World Championship, is an international ice speedway competition, first held in Kalinin (Tver), USSR, in 1979. Since its establishment, the tournament has been noted by a continued Russian dominance: the Soviet Union, Commonwealth of Independent States and Russia have won all but four tournaments. The only non-Russian teams to have won were West Germany in 1983, and Sweden - in 1985, 1995 and 2002.

The event has not been held since 2020 initially due to the COVID-19 pandemic and then the Russian invasion of Ukraine.

== Past winners ==
Year	Venue	Winner	Runner Up	Third	Ref
1979	(Soviet Union) Kalinin	Soviet Union	Czechoslovakia	West Germany	
1980	(Netherlands) Eindhoven	Soviet Union	Czechoslovakia	Sweden	
1981	(West Germany) Inzell	Soviet Union	Czechoslovakia	Sweden	
1982	(Soviet Union) Kalinin	Soviet Union	Czechoslovakia	Sweden	
1983	(West Germany) West Berlin	West Germany	Sweden	Soviet Union	
1984	(Netherlands) Deventer	Soviet Union	Sweden	Finland	
1985	(West Germany) Inzell	Sweden	Soviet Union	West Germany	
1986	(Soviet Union) Leningrad	Soviet Union	Sweden	West Germany	
1987	(Netherlands) Heerenveen	Soviet Union	Sweden	West Germany	
1988	(France) Grenoble	Soviet Union	Sweden	Finland	
1989	(Netherlands) Assen	Soviet Union	Sweden	Czechoslovakia	
1990	(Soviet Union) Alma-Ata	Soviet Union	Sweden	West Germany	
1991	(Germany) Inzell	Soviet Union	Czechoslovakia	Sweden	
1992	(Finland) Oulu	(Commonwealth of Independent States) CIS	Sweden	Germany	
1993	(Netherlands) Assen	Russia	Sweden	Netherlands	
1994	(Sweden) Karlstad	Russia	Sweden	Germany	
1995	(Germany) Frankfurt am Main	Sweden	Russia	Kazakhstan	
1996	(Russia) Izhevsk	Russia	Sweden	Kazakhstan	
1997	(Germany) Berlin	Russia	Sweden	Finland	
1998	(Sweden) Gothenburg	Russia	Sweden	Finland	
1999	(Germany) Berlin	Russia	Sweden	Austria	
2000	(Germany) Berlin	Russia	Finland	Sweden	
2001	(Germany) Berlin	Russia	Austria	Germany	
2002	(Russia) Krasnogorsk	Sweden	Russia	Europe	
2003	(Russia) Saransk	Russia	Sweden	Germany	
2004	(Germany) Inzell	Russia	Germany	Austria	
2005	(Russia) Krasnogorsk	Russia	Europe	Germany	
2006	(Germany) Berlin	Russia	Sweden	Finland	
2007	(Russia) Saransk	Russia	Sweden	Germany	
2008	(Russia) Krasnogorsk	Russia	Austria	Finland	
2009	(Germany) Inzell	Russia	Austria	Germany	
2010	(Russia) Krasnogorsk	Russia	Sweden	Austria	
2011	(Germany) Berlin	Russia	Austria	Czech Republic	
2012	(Russia) Tolyatti	Russia	Austria	Czech Republic	
2013	(Poland) Sanok	Russia	Austria	Sweden	
2014	(Russia) Tolyatti	Russia	Sweden	Finland	
2015	(Germany) Berlin	Russia	Austria	Czech Republic	
2016	(Russia) Tolyatti	Russia	Sweden	Austria	
2017	(Germany) Inzell	Russia	Austria	Germany	
2018	(Russia) Shadrinsk	Russia	Sweden	Austria	
2019	(Russia) Tolyatti	Russia	Sweden	Austria	
2020	(Germany) Berlin	Russia	Sweden	Germany	
2026	(Netherlands) Heerenveen	Finland	Sweden	Germany	

== See also ==
- Ice speedway
- Ice racing
- Individual Ice Speedway World Championship
- Speedway of Nations
