= Sergey Kazakov (speedway rider) =

Soviet speedway rider

Personal information
- Born: 9 November 1953 (age 72) Vladivostok, Soviet Union

Sport
- Sport: Ice speedway
Medal record
Representing the Soviet Union
World championships
Bronze medal – third place	1975 Moscow	Individual
Gold medal – first place	1982 Inzell	Individual
Gold medal – first place	1983 Eindhoven	Individual
Gold medal – first place	1982 Kaliningrad	Team
Bronze medal – third place	1983 Berlin	Team
Gold medal – first place	1984 Deventer	Team
Silver medal – second place	1985 Inzell	Team
Gold medal – first place	1988 Grenoble	Team
Gold medal – first place	1990 Almaty	Team

Sergey Kazakov (born 9 November 1953) is a former international speedway rider from the Soviet Union.

== Speedway career ==
Kazakov is a two-time world champion. He won gold medals at the Individual Ice Speedway World Championship in the 1982 Individual Ice Speedway World Championship and the 1983 Individual Ice Speedway World Championship.

In addition, Kazakov won the Team Ice Racing World Championship four times (1982, 1984, 1988, and 1990).

== World final appearances ==
=== Ice World Championship ===
- 1975 (Soviet Union) Moscow, 3rd – 25pts
- 1982 (West Germany) Inzell, champion – 28pts
- 1983 (Netherlands) Eindhoven, champion – 28pts
- 1985 (Netherlands) Assen, 15th
- 1988 (Netherlands) Eindhoven, 4th
