= Ice speedway =

Motorcycle speedway racing on frozen surface

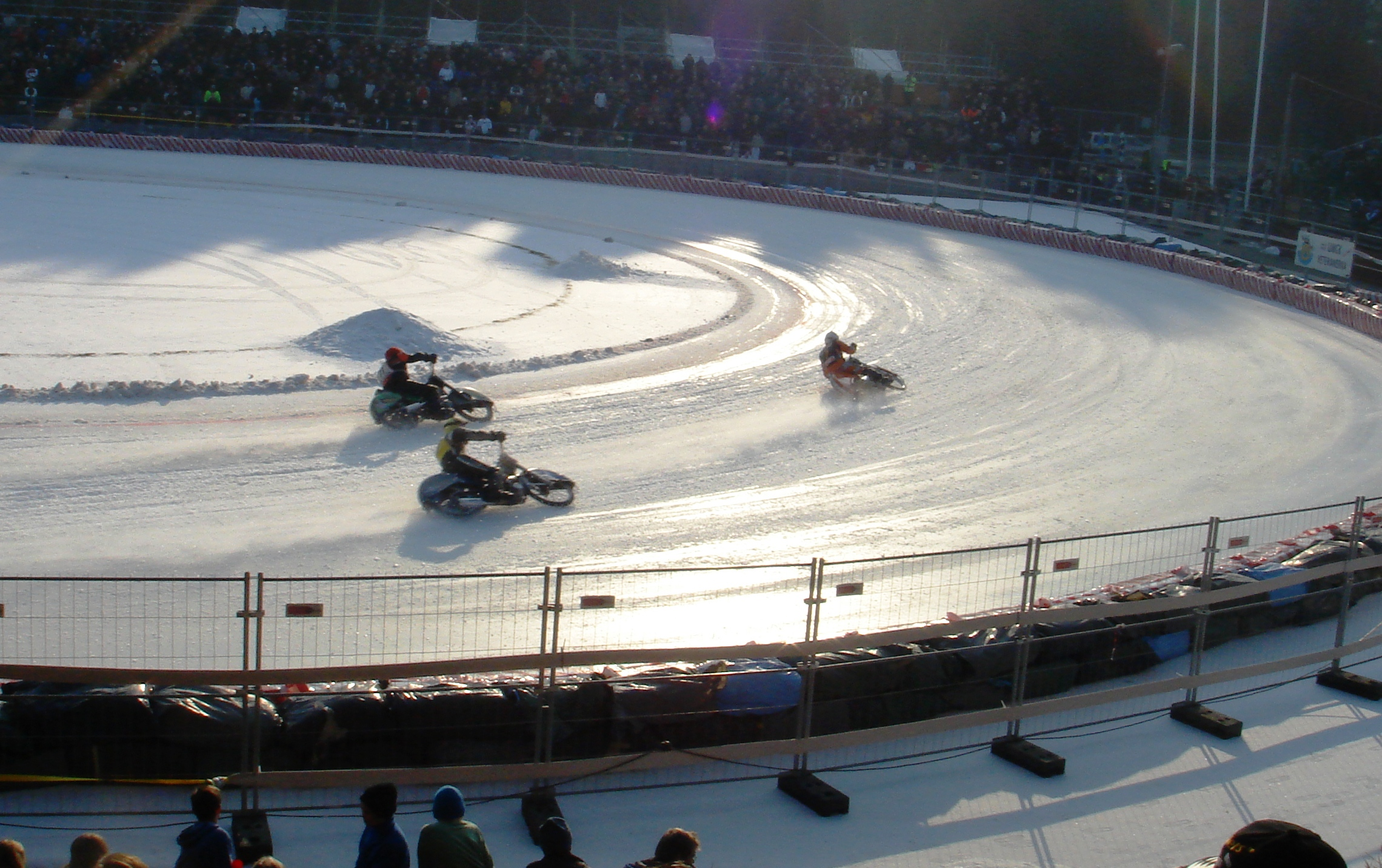
- Swedish 2007 national championship
- Highest governing body: FIM

Characteristics
- Equipment: Speedway motorcycle
- Venue: Frozen motorcycle speedway

Presence
- Olympic: No
- World Championships: Yes
- Paralympic: No

Ice speedway is a developed form of motorcycle speedway racing, featuring racing on frozen surfaces. The sport uses bikes enhanced for the terrain. Participants can compete at international level.

== Outline ==
The bikes race counterclockwise around oval tracks between 260 and 425 metres in length. The race structure and scoring are similar to that in speedway.

== History ==
Ice speedway is an evolution of dirt speedway racing, which first started in 1923. Staten Lorenz of Michigan is generally credited with the invention of the sport, in 1975. The first ice speedway event was organized and promoted by a local motorcycle dealer in Huntsville, Alabama. The third ever event was hosted at the Kent State University hockey field house, which speedway rider Gary Densford was invited to attend by his friend Bob Hetrick. At this event, Hetrick finished first and Densford finished second. Densford went on to promote this new sport, forming the ICE (international Championship Events).

=== Studs ===
Later, in 1982, studded tires were made mandatory. Specially designed studs were used, the first design was the "Ice Getter", a single track of studs which increased traction on the ice but didn't significantly increase wear on the ice (important to consider for indoor racing). Later, a new design was used, the "Kold Kutter", had dual tracks of studs, which increased traction further but increased wear on the ice. The performance gains from the Kold Kutters was so significant, however, that supposedly some of the older racers decided to retire. Lastly, in 1991, the ICE mandated a new type of racing stud, the "Silver Rockets Racing Studs", which had the most traction and least ice wear out of any design so far.

== Bike construction ==
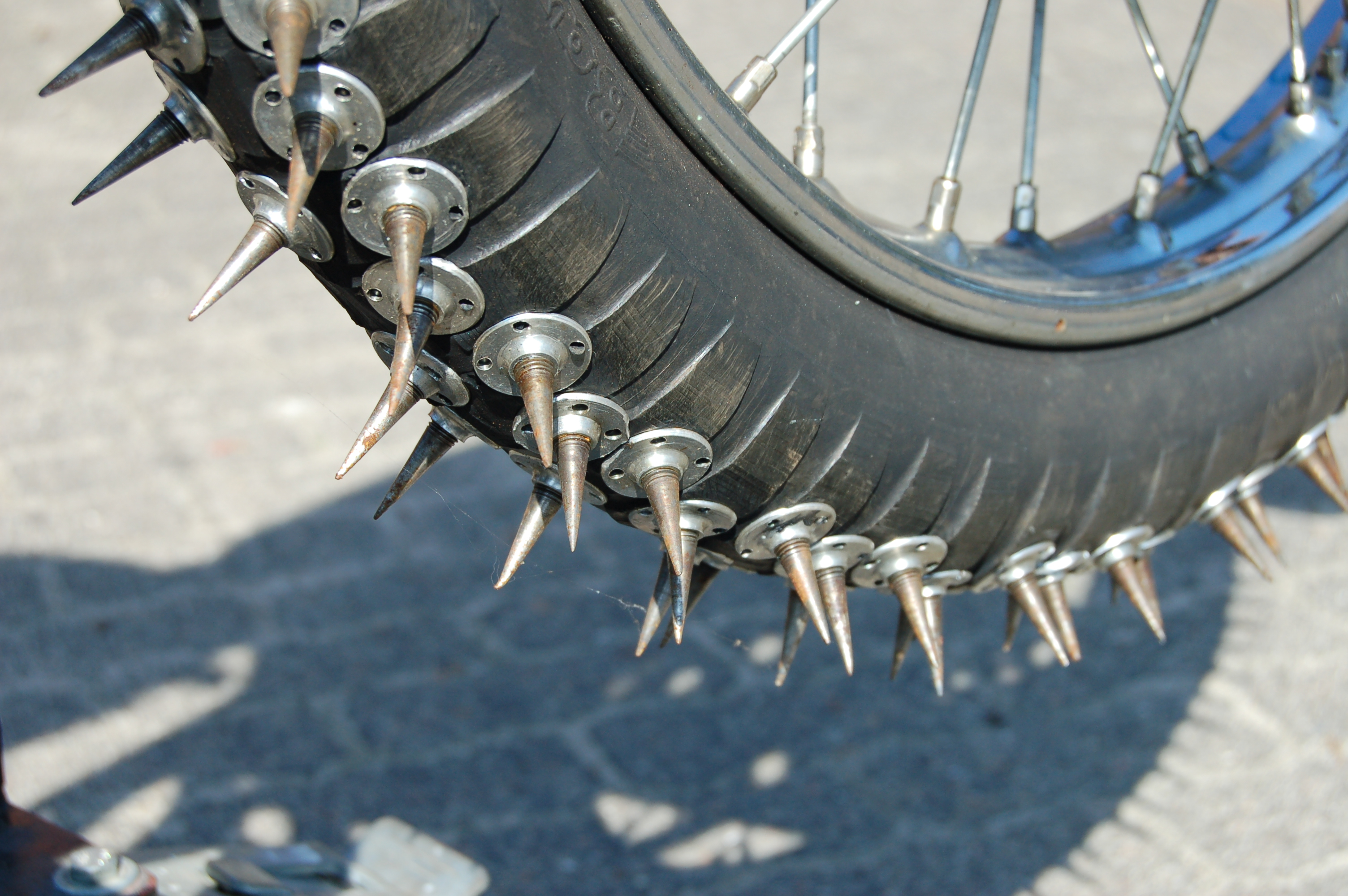
A close-up of a studded tire

The bikes bear a passing resemblance to those used for speedway, but have a longer wheelbase and a more rigid frame. As with speedway, the bikes do not have brakes.

The sport is divided into classes for full-rubber and studded tyres. The studded tyre category involves competitors riding on bikes with spikes up to 3 centimetres in length screwed into each treadless tyre, each bike has between the 130 and 140 spikes on the front tyre and between the 170 and 190 on the rear (regulations on length and types of permissible studs are controlled by the sanctioning body). The use of these spikes in this discipline necessitate the addition of special protective guards (similar to mudguards) over the wheels which extend almost to the ice surface. The spiked tyres produce a tremendous amount of traction and this means two-speed gearboxes are also required.

The use of spikes on the tyres makes the sport more dangerous with fallen riders running the risk of being run over by other bikes. Ice speedway riders have often been described as both the bravest and craziest of all speedway riders.

== Technique ==
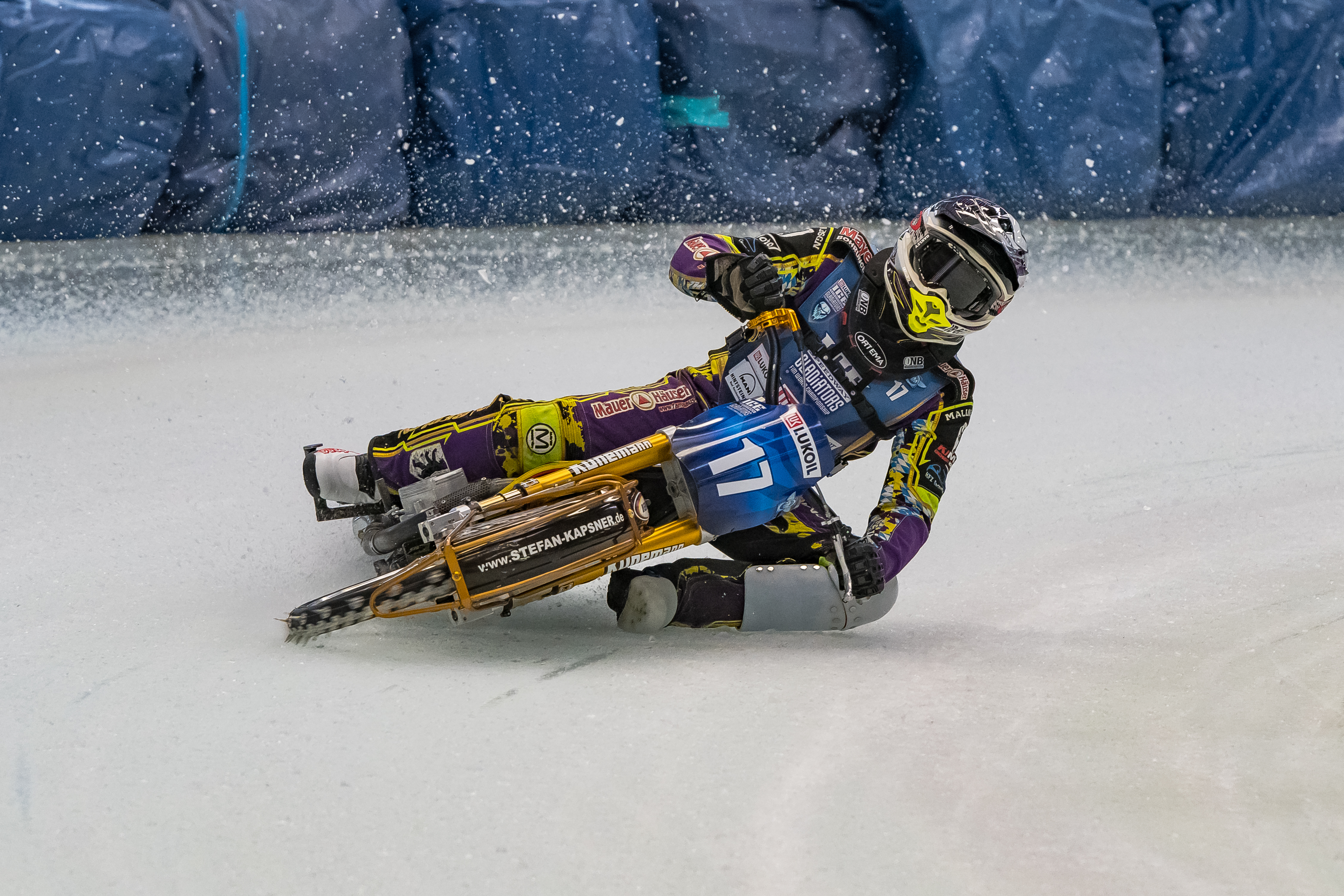
2018 FIM Ice Speedway Gladiators World Championship

In the studded tyre class there is no broadsiding around the bends due to the grip produced by the spikes digging into the ice. Instead, riders lean their bikes into the bends at an angle where the handlebars just skim the track surface. Speeds approach 80 mph (130 km/h) on the straights, and 60 mph (100 km/h) on the bends. The safety barrier usually consists of straw bales or banked-up snow and ice around the outer edge of the track.

Since the riding style required for studded ice racing is different from that used in the other track racing disciplines, riders from this sport rarely participate in speedway or its other variants and vice versa.

== Competitions ==
The majority of Fédération Internationale de Motocyclisme sanctioned team and individual meetings are held in Russia, Sweden and Finland, but events are also held in the Czech Republic, Germany, the Netherlands, and occasionally other countries. Countries that dominated and won the majority of titles in Individual Ice Racing World Championship (held since 1966) and Team Ice Racing World Championship (held since 1979) were the USSR and since 1991—Russia. Canada's national touring series is sanctioned by the Canadian Motorcycle Association.

| | World Championships (FIM) | Europe Championship (UEM) |
|---|---|---|
| Individual | Individual (since 1966) | Individual; Individual U-21 (since 2009) |
| Pair | — | — |
| Nations | Nations (since 1979) | — |

== Notable drivers ==
Being a winter sport, ice speedway is mostly popular in the northern/north-eastern half of Europe and North America. Notable drivers include Sweden's Per-Olof Serenius, multiple world champion and with 22 Swedish championships to his belt, and Russia's Nikolai Krasnikov, septuple world champion (2005–2011).

== See also ==
- Ice racing
- Motorcycle speedway
- Outline of motorcycles and motorcycling
- Icetrack cycling
