= Alexander Balashov (speedway rider) =

Russian international speedway rider

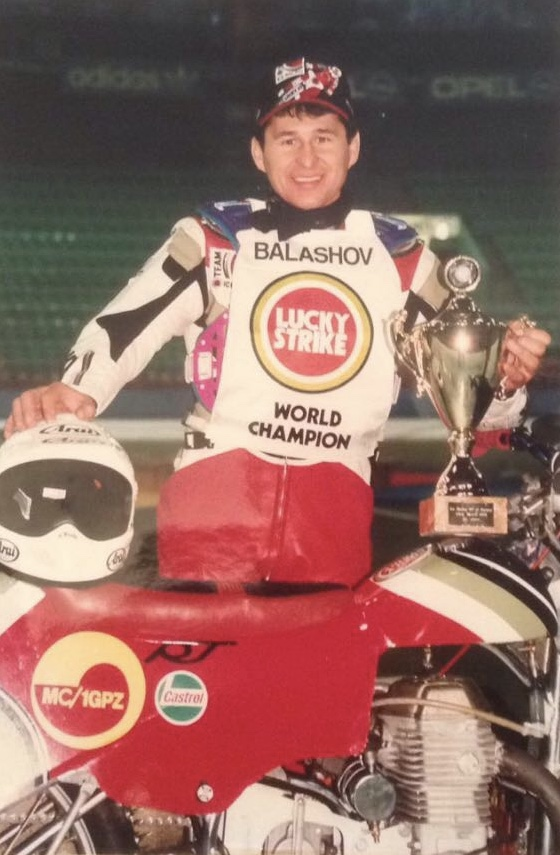

Personal information
- Born: 28 May 1967 (age 59) Soviet Union

Sport
- Sport: Ice speedway
Medal record
Representing the CIS
Gold medal – first place	1992	Team
Representing the Russia
World championships
Silver medal – second place	1993	Individual
Gold medal – first place	1993	Team
Gold medal – first place	1994	Individual
Gold medal – first place	1994	Team
Silver medal – second place	1995	Individual
Gold medal – first place	1996	Individual
Gold medal – first place	1996	Team
Silver medal – second place	1997	Individual
Gold medal – first place	1997	Team
Gold medal – first place	1998	Individual
Gold medal – first place	1998	Team
Silver medal – second place	1999	Individual
Gold medal – first place	1999	Team

Alexander Balashov (born 28 May 1967) is a former international speedway rider from Russia.

== Speedway career ==
Balashov is a three-time world champion, winning the gold medal at the Individual Ice Speedway World Championship in the 1994 Individual Ice Speedway World Championship, 1996 Individual Ice Speedway World Championship and 1998 Individual Ice Speedway World Championship.

In addition, Balashov won the Team Ice Racing World Championship seven times (1992, 1993, 1994, 1996, 1997, 1998 and 1999).

In August 1998, Balashov broke the track record at Brandon Stadium using ice spike tyres.
