= Per-Olof Serenius =

Swedish former ice speedway rider (born 1948)

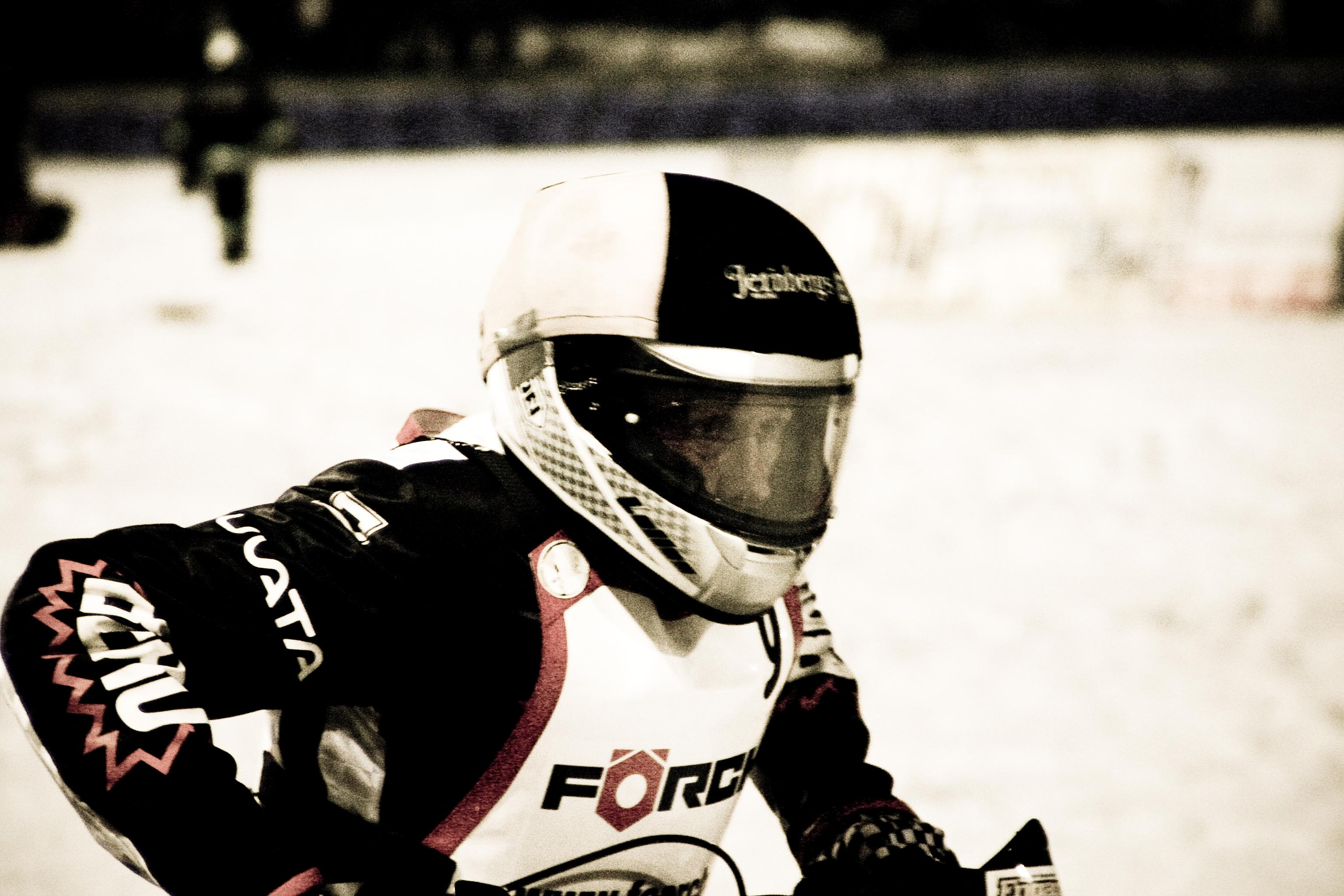
- Born: 9 March 1948 (age 78); Hedemora, Sweden
- Nationality: Swedish

Individual honours
- 1995, 2002: Ice Speedway World Champion

Per-Olof "Posa" Serenius (born 9 March 1948) in Hedemora, Sweden, is a Swedish former ice speedway rider. He is notable for winning two World Individual Championship gold medals in ice speedway.

== Biography ==
Serenius was a fireman by profession. Already an experienced motorcyclist, he began to compete in ice speedway racing in 1976 after witnessing a World Championship ice speedway competition in Berlin. His career racing record includes two World Individual Championship gold medals, three World Team gold medals, 32 World finals, 22 national championships and eight Nordic Championships. He participated in the documentary film Icy Riders from 2008. In 2016, Serenius was named an FIM Legend for his motorcycle racing achievements.

== World final appearances ==
=== Ice World Championship ===
- 1978 (Netherlands) Assen, 13th
- 1979 (West Germany) Inzell, 8th
- 1980 (Soviet Union) Kalinin, 15th
- 1981 (Netherlands) Assen, 13th
- 1982 (West Germany) Inzell, 2nd
- 1983 (Netherlands) Eindhoven, 9th
- 1984 (Soviet Union) Moscow, 10th
- 1985 (Netherlands) Assen, 10th
- 1986 (Sweden) Stockholm, 7th
- 1987 (West Germany) Berlin, 11th
- 1988 (Netherlands) Eindhoven, 8th
- 1989 (Soviet Union) Almaty, 6th
- 1990 (Sweden) Gothenburg, 4th
- 1991 (Netherlands) Assen, 2nd
- 1992 (Germany) Frankfurt, 5th
- 1993 (Russia) Saransk, 6th
- 1994 10 Rounds GP, 2nd
- 1995 10 Rounds GP, Champion
- 1996 10 Rounds GP, 6th
- 1997 (Netherlands) Assen, 6th
- 1998 10 Rounds GP, 5th
- 1999 10 Rounds GP, 10th
- 2000 (Netherlands) Assen, 11th
- 2001 8 Rounds GP, 11th
- 2002 8 Rounds GP, Champion
- 2003 6 Rounds GP, 9th
- 2004 8 Rounds GP, 9th
- 2005 6 Rounds GP, 11th
- 2006 4 Rounds GP, 12th
- 2007 6 Rounds GP, 17th
- 2008 6 Rounds GP, 10th
