= 2024 in speedway =

This article lists the main speedway events and their results for 2024. This includes the Speedway Grand Prix, Speedway of Nations, Speedway European Championship, league competitions and other tournaments.

In 2024 speedway competitions are scheduled to be held in 4 continents. FIM is the governing body of speedway sport. Five variants of the speedway sport are held around the world: speedway, long track, flat track, grasstrack and ice speedway.

== Calendars for 2024 season ==
Nation	Speedway	Long track	Flat track	Grass track	Ice speedway
Argentina	here	–	–	–	–
Australia	here	–	–	here	–
Austria	here	–	–	–	–
Belgium	here	–	–	–	–
Czech Republic	here	–	–	–	–
Denmark	here	–	–	–	–
Finland	here	–	here	–	–
France	here	–	–	–	–
Germany	here (Liga Nord)	–	–	here	–
Great Britain	here	–	here	here	–
Hungary	here	–	here	–	–
Italy	here	–	here	–	–
Latvia	here	–	–	–	–
Netherlands	here	here (KNMV)	here	here (VTBM)	here (KNMV)
Norway	here	–	–	–	–
Poland	here	–	–	–	here
Romania	here	–	–	–	–
Russia	here	–	–	–	here
Slovakia	here	–	–	–	–
Slovenia	here	–	–	–	–
Sweden	here	–	–	–	here
Ukraine	here	–	–	–	–
United States	here	–	–	–	–
FIM Speedway World Championships	here				
FIM Track Racing Calendars	here				
FIM Europe Track Racing Calendar	here				
Calendar by Nations and Tracks	here				
FIM Track Racing Website	here				

== Speedway ==
=== Domestic league seasons ===
Nation	League	Champion	Second place	Title	Last win	Tournament info	No.
Poland	2024 Ekstraliga					League system + play-offs	8
Poland	2024 Ekstraliga U24					League system + play-off	8
Poland	2024 2. Ekstraliga					League system + play-offs	8
Poland	2024 Krajowa Liga Żużlowa					League system + play-offs	6
Sweden	2024 Elitserien					League system + play-offs	8
Sweden	2024 Allsvenskan					League system + play-offs	8
Sweden	2024 Division One					12-round tournament	4
(United Kingdom) Great Britain	2024 SGB Premiership					League system + play-offs	7
(United Kingdom) Great Britain	2024 SGB Championship					League system + play-offs	9
(United Kingdom) Great Britain	2024 National Development League					League system	6
Denmark	2024 SpeedwayLigaen					League system + play-offs	7
Denmark	2024 1.Division					League system + final	8
Denmark	2024 2.Division					League system + final	6
Czech Republic	2024 Czech Extraliga					4-round tournament	4
Czech Republic	2024 Czech 1. league					5-round tournament	5
Germany	2024 Speedway-Bundesliga					Home and away + final	2
Germany	2024 Speedway Team Cup					4-round tournament	4
Germany	2024 Speedway Liga Nord					7-round tournament	7
Finland	2024 SM-Liiga					One day tournament	3
France	2024 Ligue Nationale de Speedway					4-round tournament + final	4
Norway	2024 Norwegian 1. Divisjon					5-round tournament	5
Russia	2024 Russian Team Speedway Championship					League system	4

=== Domestic junior league seasons/events ===
Nation	League	Champion	Second place	Title	Last honour
Sweden	250cc-serien 2024				
Sweden	Ungdomsserien 2024				
Denmark	2024 1.Div.85cc				
Denmark	2024 2.Div.85cc				
Denmark	2024 3.Div.85cc				
Norway	2024 Norges serien (250)				

=== World Championships ===
==== 2024 Speedway Grand Prix ====
Date	Place	Event	Winner	Second place	Third place
May 20	(Germany) Abensberg	SGP Qualifying round #1	(Germany) Kai Huckenbeck	(Denmark) Rasmus Jensen	(Poland) Dominik Kubera
May 20	(Hungary) Debrecen	SGP Qualifying round #2	(Poland) Przemyslaw Pawlicki	(Sweden) Antonio Lindback	(Latvia) Andžejs Ļebedevs
May 25	(Italy) Lonigo	SGP Qualifying round #3	(Czech Republic) Jan Kvěch	(United Kingdom) Dan Bewley	(Australia) Jack Holder
May 25	(Slovakia) Žarnovica	SGP Qualifying round #4	(Denmark) Anders Thomsen	(Poland) Patryk Dudek	(Australia) Brady Kurtz
October 4	(Czech Republic) Pardubice	SGP Challenge for 2025 SGP			
April 27	(Croatia) Donji Kraljevec	SGP Final #1	(Australia) Jack Holder	(Australia) Jason Doyle	(Sweden) Fredrik Lindgren
May 11	(Poland) Warsaw	SGP Final #2	(Australia) Jason Doyle	(Poland) Bartosz Zmarzlik	(United Kingdom) Robert Lambert
May 18	(Germany) Landshut	SGP Final #3	(Denmark) Mikkel Michelsen	(Poland) Bartosz Zmarzlik	(Australia) Jack Holder
June 1	(Czech Republic) Prague	SGP Final #4	(Slovakia) Martin Vaculik	(Sweden) Fredrik Lindgren	(Poland) Bartosz Zmarzlik
June 15	(Sweden) Målilla	SGP Final #5	(Poland) Bartosz Zmarzlik	(Australia) Max Fricke	(United Kingdom) Robert Lambert
June 29	(Poland) Gorzów Wielkopolski	SGP Final #6	(Sweden) Fredrik Lindgren	(Poland) Bartosz Zmarzlik	(Denmark) Mikkel Michelsen
August 17	(Wales) Cardiff	SGP Final #7	(United Kingdom) Dan Bewley	(United Kingdom) Robert Lambert	(Sweden) Fredrik Lindgren
August 31	(Poland) Wrocław	SGP Final #8	(Slovakia) Martin Vaculík	(Sweden) Fredrik Lindgren	(United Kingdom) Robert Lambert
September 7	(Latvia) Riga	SGP Final #9	(Poland) Bartosz Zmarzlik	(Sweden) Fredrik Lindgren	(United Kingdom) Dan Bewley
September 14	(Denmark) Vojens	SGP Final #10	(United Kingdom) Robert Lambert	(Poland) Bartosz Zmarzlik	(Poland) Maciej Janowski
September 28	(Poland) Toruń	SGP Final #11			
Overall			(Poland) Bartosz Zmarzlik		

==== 2024 Speedway of Nations ====
Date	Place	Event	Winner	Second place	Third place
July 9	(England) Manchester	First semifinal	Sweden; Fredrik Lindgren; Jacob Thorssell; Oliver Berntzon	Poland; Dominik Kubera; Bartosz Zmarzlik; Maciej Janowski	Germany; Kai Huckenbeck; Norick Blödorn; Erik Riss
July 10	(England) Manchester	Second semifinal	Denmark; Mikkel Michelsen; Anders Thomsen; Rasmus Jensen	Australia; Jack Holder; Max Fricke; Brady Kurtz	Latvia; Andzejs Lebedevs; Daniils Kolodinskis; Jevgeņijs Kostigovs
July 12	(England) Manchester	SON2 Final (u-21)	Poland; Wiktor Przyjemski; Bartosz Bańbor; Jakub Krawczyk	Sweden; Casper Henriksson; Philip Hellström Bängs; Rasmus Karlsson	Australia; Keynan Rew; James Pearson; Michael West
July 13	(England) Manchester	Final	Great Britain; Robert Lambert; Dan Bewley; Tom Brennan	Australia; Jack Holder; Max Fricke; Brady Kurtz	Sweden; Fredrik Lindgren; Jacob Thorssell; Oliver Berntzon

==== 2024 Speedway Under-21 World Championship (SGP2) ====
Date	Place	Event	Winner	Second place	Third place
June 8	(Germany) Ludwigslust	Qualifying Round	(Ukraine) Nazar Parnitskyi	(Denmark) Jesper Knudsen	(Norway) Mathias Pollestad
June 8	(Italy) Terenzano	Qualifying Round	(Poland) Sebastian Szostak	(Denmark) Bastian Pedersen	(Poland) Jakub Krawczyk
June 8	(France) Macon	Qualifying Round	(Sweden) Casper Henriksson	(Poland) Wiktor Przyjemski	(Denmark) William Drejer
June 14	(Sweden) Malilla	Final #1	(Poland) Wiktor Przyjemski	(Poland) Bartosz Bańbor	(Poland) Sebastian Szostak
September 6	(Latvia) Riga	Final #2	(Ukraine) Nazar Parnitskyi	(Poland) Wiktor Przyjemski	(Denmark) Mikkel Andersen
September 27	(Poland) Toruń	Final #3			
Overall					

==== 2024 Speedway Youth World Championship (SGP3) ====
Date	Place	Event	Winner	Second place	Third place
June 22	(Germany) Teterow	Semi final 1	(Poland) Maksymilian Pawelczak	(Denmark) Villads Pedersen	(Slovenia) Sven Cerjak
June 22	(Germany) Teterow	Semi final 2	(United Kingdom) William Cairns	(Australia) Beau Bailey	(Denmark) Jacob Bolcho Pedersen
June 28	(Poland) Gorzów Wielkopolski	Grand Prix	(Poland) Maksymilian Pawelczak	(Australia) Beau Bailey	(United Kingdom) William Cairns

==== 2024 Speedway Youth World Cup (SGP4) ====
Date	Place	Event	Winner	Second place	Third place
June 15	(Sweden) Malilla	Final	(United States) Brady Landon	(Australia) Cooper Antone	(Denmark) Niklas Bager

==== 2024 Track Racing Youth Gold Trophy ====
Date	Place	Event	Winner	Second place	Third place
July 21	(Slovakia) Žarnovica	Final	(Poland) Franciszek Szczyrba	(Germany) Levi Böhme	(Poland) Dawid Oscenda

=== European Championships ===
==== 2024 Speedway European Championship ====
Date	Place	Event	Winner	Second place	Third place
May 1	(Hungary) Debrecen	Qualifying Round 1	(Denmark) Anders Thomsen	(Sweden) Jacob Thorssell	(Poland) Kacper Woryna
May 1	(Austria) Mureck	Qualifying Round 2	(Sweden) Timo Lahti	(Denmark) Frederik Jakobsen	(Germany) Erik Riss
May 4	(Germany) Stralsund	Qualifying Round 3	(Poland) Maciej Janowski	(Poland) Przemysław Pawlicki	(Denmark) Rasmus Jensen
May 4	(Slovenia) Krško	Qualifying Round 4	(Poland) Mateusz Cierniak	(Poland) Piotr Pawlicki	(Czech Republic) Václav Milík
May 12	(Latvia) Daugavpils	ECC (Challenge)	(Poland) Maciej Janowski	(Poland) Piotr Pawlicki	(Czech Republic) Václav Milík
June 8	(Hungary) Debrecen	Final 1	(Latvia) Andžejs Ļebedevs	(Poland) Maciej Janowski	(Sweden) Jacob Thorssell
July 20	(Poland) Grudziądz	Final 2	(Denmark) Leon Madsen	(Poland) Kacper Woryna	(Poland) Piotr Pawlicki
August 24	(Germany) Güstrow	Final 3	(Latvia) Andžejs Ļebedevs	(Denmark) Leon Madsen	(Denmark) Rasmus Jensen
September 21	(Poland) Chorzów	Final 4	(Denmark) Anders Thomsen	(Denmark) Leon Madsen	(Poland) Kacper Woryna
Overall			(Latvia) Andžejs Ļebedevs	(Denmark) Leon Madsen	(Poland) Kacper Woryna

==== 2024 European Pairs Speedway Championship ====
Date	Place	Event	Winner	Second place	Third place
August 10	(Germany) Stralsund	Qualifying Round	Germany; Kevin Wölbert; Norick Blödorn	Great Britain; Tom Brennan; Leon Flint; Ashton Boughen	Czech Republic; Jan Kvech; Adam Bednar; Matouš Kamenik
October 20	(Italy) Lonigo	Final			

==== 2024 European Team Speedway Championship ====
Date	Place	Event	Winner	Second place	Third place
March 30	(Czech Republic) Pardubice	Final A	Denmark; Mikkel Michelsen; Mads Hansen; Rasmus Jensen; Anders Thomsen; Bastian Pedersen	Czech Republic; Jan Kvěch; Václav Milík; Daniel Klíma; Jan Macek; Adam Bednář	Norway; Mathias Pollestad; Truls Kamhaug; Glenn Moi; Lasse Fredriksen
March 30	(Poland) Gdańsk	Final B	Sweden; Jacob Thorssell; Antonio Lindbäck; Freddie Lindgren; Kim Nilsson; Casper Henriksson	Latvia; Andžejs Ļebedevs; Oļegs Mihailovs; Jevgeņijs Kostigovs; Daniils Kolodinskis; Francis Gusts	Germany; Valentin Grobauer; Erik Riss; Kevin Wölbert; Sandro Wassermann; Norick Blödorn
April 6	(Poland) Grudziądz	Grand Final	Poland; Bartosz Zmarzlik; Patryk Dudek; Przemysław Pawlicki; Piotr Pawlicki; Wiktor Przyjemski	Denmark; Mikkel Michelsen; Anders Thomsen; Rasmus Jensen; Mads Hansen; Bastian Pedersen	Sweden; Jacob Thorssell; Antonio Lindbäck; Freddie Lindgren; Kim Nilsson; Casper Henriksson

==== 2024 European Under 23 Team Speedway Championship ====
Date	Place	Event	Winner	Second place	Third place
April 21	(Czech Republic) Pardubice	Qualifying Round	Czech Republic; Daniel Klíma; Jan Jeníček; Jan Macek; Adam Bednář; Jan Kvěch	Great Britain; Tom Brennan; Jordan Jenkins; Anders Rowe; Leon Flint; Ashton Boughen	France; Steven Goret; Mathias Trésarrieu; Steven Labouyrie; Tino Bouin; Théo Ugoni
August 24	(Poland) Kraków	Final	Poland; Mateusz Cierniak; Bartosz Bańbor; Bartłomiej Kowalski; Jakub Krawczyk; Wiktor Przyjemski	Czech Republic; Jan Kvěch; Daniel Klíma; Adam Bednář; Jan Macek; Matous Kamenik	Denmark; Benjamin Basso; Bastian Pedersen; Mikkel Andersen; Kevin Juhl Pedersen; Vilads Nagel

==== 2024 European Under-19 Individual Speedway Championship ====
Date	Place	Event	Winner	Second place	Third place
June 29	(Czech Republic) Plzeň	Semi Final 1	(Denmark) Villads Nagel	(Poland) Wiktor Przyjemski	(Ukraine) Nazar Parnitskyi
July 20	(Finland) Varkaus	Semi Final 2			
October 10	(Germany) Herxheim	Final			

==== 2024 European Under-19 Pairs Speedway Championship ====
Date	Place	Event	Winner	Second place	Third place
June 23	(Poland) Piła	Final	Poland; Paweł Trześniewski; Bartosz Bańbor; Wiktor Przyjemski	Sweden; Rasmus Karlsson; Sammy Van Dyck	Denmark; Bastian Pedersen; Villads Nagel

==== 2024 European 250cc Youth Speedway Championship (U16) ====
Date	Place	Event	Winner	Second place	Third place
July 6	(Hungary) Debrecen	Semi Final 1	(United Kingdom) William Cairns	(Denmark) Villads Pedersen	(Hungary) Zoltan Lovas
July 6	(Hungary) Debrecen	Semi Final 2	(Poland) Maksymilian Pawelczak	(Poland) Maksymilian Kostera	(United Kingdom) Cooper Rushen
July 7	(Hungary) Debrecen	Final	(Poland) Maksymilian Pawelczak	(Denmark) Villads Pedersen	(Poland) Karol Szmyd

==== 2024 European 250cc Pairs Speedway Championship (U16) ====
Date	Place	Event	Winner	Second place	Third place
June 25	(Poland) Gdańsk	Final #1	Poland; Maksymilian Pawelczak; Maksymilian Kostera; Karol Szmyd	Great Britain; William Cairns; Cooper Rushen; Seth Norman	Denmark; Villads Pedersen; Jacob Bolcho
September 8	(Slovenia) Krško	Final #2			
September 10	(Czech Republic) Prague	Final #3			

==== 2024 European 125cc Youth Track Racing Cup (U16) ====
Date	Place	Event	Winner	Second place	Third place
July 20	(Slovakia) Žarnovica	Final	(Poland) Franciszek Szczyrba	(Latvia) Andzejs Smulkevics	(Germany) Levi Böhme

==== 2024 European 85cc Youth Speedway Racing Cup (U16) ====
Date	Place	Event	Winner	Second place	Third place
August 10	(Denmark) Slangerup	Final	(Denmark) Elias Jamil	(Germany) Niklas Bager	(Germany) Tyler Haupt

=== National Championships ===
==== Individual National Senior Championships ====
Date of Final	Place	Event	Winner	Second place	Third place	N
January 13	(New Zealand) Invercargill	New Zealand Solo Championship	(New Zealand) Bradley Wilson-Dean	(New Zealand) George Congreve	(New Zealand) Ben Whalley	(Note: One day tournament)
January 13	(Australia) Adelaide	Australian Individual Speedway Championship	(Australia) Rohan Tungate	(Australia) Max Fricke	(Australia) Jack Holder	(Note: Series consists of 5 rounds)
January 27	(Australia) Gillman	Oceania Individual Speedway Championship	(Australia) Jaimon Lidsey	(United Kingdom) Tai Woffinden	(Australia) Brady Kurtz	
February 14	(Argentina) Bahia Blanca	Argentine Individual Speedway Championship	(Poland) Patryk Wojdyło	(Poland) Paweł Miesiąc	(Argentina) Eber Ampugnani	(Note: Series consists of 10 rounds.)
March 30	(Netherlands) Veenoord	Dutch Individual Speedway Championship	(Netherlands) Mika Meijer	(Netherlands) Henry van der Steen	(Netherlands) William Kruit	
April 6	(Hungary) Debrecen	Hungarian Individual Speedway Championship				
April 7	(Slovakia) Žarnovica	International Slovak Championship	(Slovakia) Martin Vaculík	(Poland) Jakub Jamróg	(Poland) Robert Chmiel	
May 5	(France) Morizès	French Individual Speedway Championship	Event was postponed			
	(Argentina)	Argentine Winter Speedway Championship				
May 28	(Sweden) Västervik	Swedish Individual Speedway Championship	(Sweden) Fredrik Lindgren	(Sweden) Kim Nilsson	(Sweden) Filip Hjelmland	(Note: Final is preceded by qualifications held on 19th of May.)
June 8	(England) Manchester	British Speedway Championship	(United Kingdom) Dan Bewley	(United Kingdom) Tai Woffinden	(United Kingdom) Tom Brennan	
June 29	(Norway) Kristiansand	Norwegian Individual Speedway Championship				
August 7	(Denmark) Grindsted	Danish Individual Speedway Championship	(Denmark) Anders Thomsen	(Denmark) Michael Jepsen Jensen	(Denmark) Mikkel Michelsen	(Note: Final is preceded by two semifinals held on 3rd of July.)
August 10	(Poland) Lublin	Polish Individual Speedway Championship				(Note: Series consists of 3 final rounds preceded by eliminations and challenge.)
August 24	(Finland) Varkaus	Finnish Individual Speedway Championship				
August 25	(Romania) Brăila	Romanian Individual Speedway Championship				(Note: Series consists of 2 rounds held in Brăila on August 24 & 25.)
September 11	(Czech Republic) Plzeň	Czech Republic Individual Speedway Championship				(Note: Series consists of 2 rounds held in Kopřivnice on August 3 and in Plzeň on September 11)
September 14	(Russia)	Russian Individual Speedway Championship				
September 21	(Germany) Pocking	German Individual Speedway Championship				
September 21	(United States) Auburn	AMA National Speedway Championship				(Note: Series consists of 3 rounds)
September 29	(Italy) Lonigo	Italian Individual Speedway Championship				(Note: Series consists of 8 rounds.)
October 12	(United States) Costa Mesa	United States Speedway National Championship				
December 7	(United States) Bakersfield	AMA / FIM North America Speedway Championship				
	(Ukraine)	Ukrainian Individual Speedway Championship				(Note: Series consists of 4 rounds)
	(Latvia)	Latvian Individual Speedway Championship				
	(Slovenia)	Slovenian Individual Speedway Championship				

==== Individual National Junior Championships ====
Date of Final	Place	Event	Winner	Second place	Third place	N
June 2	(Scotland) Glasgow	British Speedway Under 21 Championship	(United Kingdom) Sam Hagon	(United Kingdom) Leon Flint	(United Kingdom) Ashton Boughen	(Note: Final is preceded by semi-final held on 30th of April.)
August 7	(Sweden) Gislaved	Swedish Junior Speedway Championship				
August 17	(Poland) Krosno	Polish Junior Individual Speedway Championship				(Note: Final is preceded by eliminations held on 4th of July.)
August 23	(Denmark) Esbjerg	Danish Under 21 Individual Speedway Championship				(Note: Final is preceded by semi-final held on 24th of June.)
August 29	(Czech Republic) Various	Czech Junior Speedway Championship				
September 8	(Russia) Togliatti	Russian Speedway Under 21 Championship				
October 5	(Germany) Güstrow	German Speedway Under 21 Championship				
November 23/24	(Australia) Bowen	Australian Under-21 Individual Speedway Championship				

==== Individual National Youth Championships ====
Date of Final	Place	Event	Winner	Second place	Third place	N
August 24	(Slovenia) / (Czech Republic) Various	2024 Czech Speedway Youth Championship (250cc)				
August 27	(Slovakia) / (Czech Republic) Various	2024 Czech Speedway Youth Championship (125cc)				(Note: Series consists of 7 rounds)
August 31	(England) / (Scotland) Various	2024 British Speedway Youth Championship (500cc)				
August 31	(England) / (Scotland) Various	2024 British Speedway Youth Championship (250cc)				
August 31	(England) / (Scotland) Various	2024 British Speedway Youth Championship (125cc)				
August 31	(Russia) Balakovo	Russian Speedway Under 19 Championship				
August 31	(United States) Auburn	AMA Speedway Youth 250 and 150 National Championship				
September 26	(Poland) Various	2024 Zaplecze Kadry Juniorów				(Note: Series consists of 13 rounds)
September 28/29	(Australia) Kingaroy	2024 Australian Speedway Youth Championship (125cc)				

==== Pairs National Championships (Senior & Junior) ====
Date of Final	Place	Event	Winner	Second place	Third place	N
April 7	(Poland) Poznań	Polish Pairs Speedway Championship	Lublin (Poland) Bartosz Zmarzlik (Poland) Dominik Kubera (Australia) Jack Holder	Toruń (Poland) Emil Sajfutdinow (United Kingdom) Robert Lambert (Poland) Patryk Dudek	Wrocław (Poland) Artem Laguta (United Kingdom) Dan Bewley (Poland) Maciej Janowski	
May 1	(Germany) Brokstedt	German Pairs Speedway Championship	Brokstedt (Germany) Norick Blödorn (Germany) Kevin Wölbert (Germany) Birger Jähn	Landshut (Germany) Valentin Grobauer (Germany) Erik Bachhuber (Germany) Lukas Baumann	Herxheim (Germany) Max Dilger (Germany) Daniel Spiller (Germany) Mario Niedermeier	
May 25	(Norway) Oslo	Norwegian Pairs Speedway Championship				
June 19	(Czech Republic) Slaný	Czech Republic Pairs Speedway Championship				
August 16	(England) Oxford	SGB Championship Pairs Championship				
August 17	(Finland) Haapajärvi	Finnish Pairs Speedway Championship				
September 19	(Poland) Grudziądz	Polish Pairs Speedway Junior Championship				(Note: Final is preceded by eliminations held on 4th of July.)
October 2	(Russia) Vladivostok	Russian Pairs Speedway Championship				

==== Team National Championships (Senior & Junior) ====
Date of Final	Place	Event	Winner	Second place	Third place	N
May 26	(Czech Republic) Plzeň	Czech Team Speedway Junior Championship	AK Markéta Praha (Czech Republic) Adam Bednář (Czech Republic) Jaroslav Vaníček	AMK Zlatá Přilba Pardubice (Czech Republic) Jan Jeníček (Czech Republic) Matouš Kameník	AK Slaný (Czech Republic) Bruno Belan (Australia) Michael West	
June 8	(Russia) Balakovo	Russian Team U-21 Speedway Championship				(Note: Series consists of 1st round, 2nd round and final held on 8th of June.)
August 31	(Norway) Elgane	Norwegian Team Speedway Championship				
September 25	(Poland) Poznań	Polish Team Speedway Junior Championship				(Note: Series consists of 5 qualification races, 4 quarterfinals, 4 semifinals with final (4 events) to be concluded on September 25)
October 5	(Russia) Vladivostok	Russian Team Speedway Cup				

=== National Championships - Elimination Races & Partial Rounds ===
==== National Individual Championships (Senior & Junior) ====
Date	Place	Event	Winner	Second place	Third place
December 30, 2023	(Argentina) Daireaux	Argentine Speedway Championship Round 1	(Poland) Patryk Wojdyło	(Argentina) Eber Ampugnani	(Argentina) Cristian Zubillaga
January 10	(Argentina) Bahía Blanca	Argentine Speedway Championship Round 2	(Argentina) Facundo Albin	(Poland) Paweł Miesiąc	(Poland) Patryk Wojdyło
January 14	(Argentina) Carlos Casares	Argentine Speedway Championship Round 3	(Poland) Paweł Miesiąc	(Poland) Patryk Wojdyło	(Argentina) Eber Ampugnani
January 16	(Argentina) Bahía Blanca	Argentine Speedway Championship Round 4	(Argentina) Jonathan Iturre	(Argentina) Eber Ampugnani	(Argentina) Cristian Zubillaga
January 23	(Argentina) Bahía Blanca	Argentine Speedway Championship Round 5	(Argentina) Facundo Albin	(Argentina) Cristian Zubillaga	(Argentina) Jonathan Iturre
January 27	(Argentina) Colonia Barón	Argentine Speedway Championship Round 6	(Argentina) Eber Ampugnani	(Poland) Patryk Wojdyło	(Argentina) Alex Acuña
January 31	(Argentina) Bahía Blanca	Argentine Speedway Championship Round 7	(Poland) Paweł Miesiąc	(Italy) Nicolás Covatti	(Argentina) Alex Acuña
February 3	(Argentina) Carlos Casares	Argentine Speedway Championship Round 8	(Italy) Nicolás Covatti	(Poland) Patryk Wojdyło	(Argentina) Eber Ampugnani
February 6	(Argentina) Bahía Blanca	Argentine Speedway Championship Round 9	(Poland) Patryk Wojdyło	(Italy) Nicolás Covatti	(Argentina) Cristian Zubillaga
February 13	(Argentina) Bahía Blanca	Argentine Speedway Championship Round 10	(Poland) Patryk Wojdyło	(Argentina) Eber Ampugnani	(Argentina) Cristian Zubillaga
April 21	(Argentina) Carlos Casares	Argentine Winter Speedway Championship Round 1	(Argentina) Alex Acuña	(Argentina) Eber Ampugnani	(Argentina) Santiago Gallardo
January 4	(Australia) Banyo	Australian Speedway Championship Round 1	(Australia) Max Fricke	(Australia) Rohan Tungate	(Australia) Jaimon Lidsey
January 7	(Australia) Kurri Kurri	Australian Speedway Championship Round 2	(Australia) Rohan Tungate	(Australia) Max Fricke	(Australia) Jack Holder
January 9	(Australia) Wodonga	Australian Speedway Championship Round 3	(Australia) Max Fricke	(Australia) Ryan Douglas	(Australia) Ben Cook
January 11	(Australia) Mildura	Australian Speedway Championship Round 4	(Australia) Brady Kurtz	(Australia) Max Fricke	(Australia) Rohan Tungate
January 13	(Australia) Adelaide	Australian Speedway Championship Round 5	(Australia) Brady Kurtz	(Australia) Rohan Tungate	(Australia) Jaimon Lidsey
April 27	(Czech Republic) Plzeň	Czech Republic Junior Speedway Championship #1	(Czech Republic) Adam Bednář	(Czech Republic) Jan Jeníček	(Poland) Kacper Szopa
May 11	(Czech Republic) Divišov	Czech Republic Junior Speedway Championship #2	(Czech Republic) Adam Bednář	(Czech Republic) Matouš Kameník	(Czech Republic) Jaroslav Vaníček
August 7	(Czech Republic) Pardubice	Czech Republic Junior Speedway Championship #3			
August 29	(Czech Republic) Prague	Czech Republic Junior Speedway Championship #4			
August 3	(Czech Republic) Kopřivnice	Czech Republic Speedway Championship Round 1			
September 11	(Czech Republic) Plzeň	Czech Republic Speedway Championship Round 2			
April 16	(Denmark) Vojens	National qualifications SEC/SGP	(Denmark) Andreas Lyager	(Denmark) Anders Thomsen	(Denmark) Rasmus Jensen
April 29	(Denmark) Fjelsted	National qualifications SEC U21/SGP 2	(Denmark) Mikkel Andersen	(Denmark) Villads Nagel	(Denmark) Bastian Pedersen
June 24	(Denmark) Holstebro	Danish Junior Speedway Championship Semifinal			
July 3	(Denmark) Slangerup	Danish Speedway Championship Semifinal 1			
July 3	(Denmark) Fladbro	Danish Speedway Championship Semifinal 2			
April 30	(United Kingdom) Plymouth	British Speedway Under 21 Championship Semifinal	(United Kingdom) Sam Hagon	(United Kingdom) Vinnie Foord	(United Kingdom) Freddy Hodder
April 14	(Italy) Lonigo	Italian Speedway Championship Round 1	(Italy) Paco Castagna	(Italy) Nicolas Vicentin	(Germany) Martin Smolinski
April 20	(Italy) Terenzano	Italian Speedway Championship Round 2	(Italy) Paco Castagna	(Italy) Nicolas Vicentin	(Italy) Matteo Boncinelli
April 21	(Italy) Terenzano	Italian Speedway Championship Round 3	(Italy) Paco Castagna	(Italy) Nicolas Vicentin	(Italy) Niccolò Percotti
June 15	(Italy) Lonigo	Italian Speedway Championship Round 4			
August 3	(Italy) Lonigo	Italian Speedway Championship Round 5			
September 14	(Italy) Terenzano	Italian Speedway Championship Round 6			
September 15	(Italy) Terenzano	Italian Speedway Championship Round 7			
September 29	(Italy) Lonigo	Italian Speedway Championship Round 8			
July 4	(Poland)	Polish Junior Speedway Championship Eliminations			
May 9	(Poland)	Polish Speedway Championship Eliminations			
May 30	(Poland) Piła	Polish Speedway Championship Challenge			
July 6	(Poland) Łódź	Polish Speedway Championship Final 1			
July 27	(Poland) Bydgoszcz	Polish Speedway Championship Final 2			
August 10	(Poland) Lublin	Polish Speedway Championship Final 3			
August 24	(Romania) Brăila	Romanian Speedway Championship Round 1			
August 25	(Romania) Brăila	Romanian Speedway Championship Round 2			
May 19	(Sweden) Örebro	Swedish Speedway Championship Qualifications	(Sweden) Sammy Van Dyck	(Sweden) Ludvig Lindgren	(Sweden) Noel Wahlqvist
May 19	(Ukraine) Rivne	Ukrainian Speedway Championship Round 1	(Ukraine) Roman Kapustin	(Ukraine) Vladyslav Duda	(Ukraine) Denis Przysazniuk
June 1	(Ukraine) Chervonohrad	Ukrainian Speedway Championship Round 2			
July 14	(Ukraine) Rivne	Ukrainian Speedway Championship Round 3			
August 31	(Ukraine) Rivne	Ukrainian Speedway Championship Round 4			
June 22	(United States) Bakersfield	AMA National Speedway Championship Round 1	(United States) Broc Nicol	(United States) Billy Janniro	(United States) Max Ruml
August 3	(United States) City of Industry	AMA National Speedway Championship Round 2			
September 21	(United States) Auburn	AMA National Speedway Championship Round 3			

==== National Individual Championships (Youth) ====
Date	Place	Event	Winner	Second place	Third place
June 15	(Scotland) Edinburgh	British Speedway Youth Championship (500cc) Round 1			
June 16	(Scotland) Glasgow	British Speedway Youth Championship (500cc) Round 2	Event was postponed		
July 15	(England) Birmingham	British Speedway Youth Championship (500cc) Round 3			
July 26	(England) Middlesbrough	British Speedway Youth Championship (500cc) Round 4			
July 27	(England) Workington	British Speedway Youth Championship (500cc) Round 5			
August 2	(England) Manchester	British Speedway Youth Championship (500cc) Round 6			
August 31	(England) Leicester	British Speedway Youth Championship (500cc) Round 7			
May 11	(England) Workington	British Speedway Youth Championship (250cc) Round 1	(England) Cooper Rushen	(England) Jamie Etherington	(England) Archie Rolph
June 1	(England) Plymouth	British Speedway Youth Championship (250cc) Round 2	Event was postponed		
June 15	(Scotland) Edinburgh	British Speedway Youth Championship (250cc) Round 3			
June 16	(Scotland) Glasgow	British Speedway Youth Championship (250cc) Round 4			
July 15	(England) Birmingham	British Speedway Youth Championship (250cc) Round 5			
August 23	(England) Middlesbrough	British Speedway Youth Championship (250cc) Round 6			
August 30	(England) Manchester	British Speedway Youth Championship (250cc) Round 7			
August 31	(England) Leicester	British Speedway Youth Championship (250cc) Round 8			
May 11	(England) Workington	British Speedway Youth Championship (125cc) Round 1	(England) Oliver Bovingdon	(England) Lewis Hague	(England) Rocco Webb
June 1	(England) Plymouth	British Speedway Youth Championship (125cc) Round 2	Event was postponed		
June 15	(Scotland) Edinburgh	British Speedway Youth Championship (125cc) Round 3			
June 16	(Scotland) Glasgow	British Speedway Youth Championship (125cc) Round 4			
July 26	(England) Middlesbrough	British Speedway Youth Championship (125cc) Round 5			
July 27	(England) Workington	British Speedway Youth Championship (125cc) Round 6			
August 2	(England) Manchester	British Speedway Youth Championship (125cc) Round 7			
August 23	(England) Middlesbrough	British Speedway Youth Championship (125cc) Round 8			
August 30	(England) Manchester	British Speedway Youth Championship (125cc) Round 9			
August 31	(England) Leicester	British Speedway Youth Championship (125cc) Round 10			
April 7	(Slovenia) Krško	Czech Speedway Youth Championship (250cc) Round 1	(United Kingdom) William Cairns	(Germany) Janek Konzack	(Slovenia) Sven Cerjak
TBA	(Czech Republic) Pardubice	Czech Speedway Youth Championship (250cc) Round 2			
July 28	(Czech Republic) Liberec	Czech Speedway Youth Championship (250cc) Round 3			
August 7	(Czech Republic) Pardubice	Czech Speedway Youth Championship (250cc) Round 4			
August 24	(Czech Republic) Liberec	Czech Speedway Youth Championship (250cc) Round 5			
April 27	(Czech Republic) Plzeň	Czech Speedway Youth Championship (125cc) Round 1	(Czech Republic) Adam Nejezchleba	(Czech Republic) Karel Průša	(Czech Republic) Štěpánka Nyklová
May 18	(Czech Republic) Slaný	Czech Speedway Youth Championship (125cc) Round 2			
June 2	(Czech Republic) Slaný	Czech Speedway Youth Championship (125cc) Round 3			
June 30	(Czech Republic) Chabařovice	Czech Speedway Youth Championship (125cc) Round 4			
July 28	(Czech Republic) Liberec	Czech Speedway Youth Championship (125cc) Round 5			
August 11	(Slovakia) Žarnovica	Czech Speedway Youth Championship (125cc) Round 6			
August 24	(Czech Republic) Liberec	Czech Speedway Youth Championship (125cc) Round 7			
April 16	(Poland) Ostrów	Zaplecze Kadry Juniorów Round 1	(Poland) Damian Ratajczak	(Poland) Oskar Paluch	(Poland) Sebastian Szostak
May 15	(Poland) Poznań	Zaplecze Kadry Juniorów Round 2	(Poland) Kacper Grzelak	(Poland) Bartosz Bańbor	(Poland) Marcel Kowolik (Poland) Oskar Paluch (Poland) Kacper Halkiewicz
May 16	(Poland) Piła	Zaplecze Kadry Juniorów Round 3			
May 27	(Poland) Łódź	Zaplecze Kadry Juniorów Round 4			
July 12	(Poland) Rybnik	Zaplecze Kadry Juniorów Round 5			
July 13	(Poland) Opole	Zaplecze Kadry Juniorów Round 6			
July 31	(Poland) Rzeszów	Zaplecze Kadry Juniorów Round 7			
August 1	(Poland) Kraków	Zaplecze Kadry Juniorów Round 8			
August 29	(Poland) Krosno	Zaplecze Kadry Juniorów Round 9			
August 30	(Poland) Tarnów	Zaplecze Kadry Juniorów Round 10			
September 18	(Poland) Gdańsk	Zaplecze Kadry Juniorów Round 11			
September 19	(Poland) Bydgoszcz	Zaplecze Kadry Juniorów Round 12			
September 26	(Poland) Gniezno	Zaplecze Kadry Juniorów Round 13			

==== National Team & Pairs Championships (Junior) ====
Date	Place	Event	Winner	Second place	Third place
July 4	(Poland)	Polish Pairs Speedway Junior Championship Eliminations			
May 4	(Poland)	Team Speedway Junior Polish Championship Round 1			
May 12	(Poland)	Team Speedway Junior Polish Championship Round 2			
May 22	(Poland)	Team Speedway Junior Polish Championship Round 3			
May 23	(Poland)	Team Speedway Junior Polish Championship Round 4			
June 5	(Poland)	Team Speedway Junior Polish Championship Round 5			
June 19	(Poland)	Team Speedway Junior Polish Championship Quarterfinals Round 1			
June 20	(Poland)	Team Speedway Junior Polish Championship Quarterfinals Round 2			
July 24	(Poland)	Team Speedway Junior Polish Championship Quarterfinals Round 3			
July 25	(Poland)	Team Speedway Junior Polish Championship Quarterfinals Round 4			
August 7	(Poland)	Team Speedway Junior Polish Championship Semifinals Round 1			
August 8	(Poland)	Team Speedway Junior Polish Championship Semifinals Round 2			
August 21	(Poland)	Team Speedway Junior Polish Championship Semifinals Round 3			
August 22	(Poland)	Team Speedway Junior Polish Championship Semifinals Round 4			
September 4	(Poland)	Team Speedway Junior Polish Championship Final Round 1			
September 11	(Poland)	Team Speedway Junior Polish Championship Final Round 2			
September 12	(Poland)	Team Speedway Junior Polish Championship Final Round 3			
September 25	(Poland) Poznań	Team Speedway Junior Polish Championship Final Round 4			
September 1	(Russia) Togliatti	Russian Team Speedway Cup Final Round 1			
September 5	(Russia)	Russian Team Speedway Cup Final Round 2			
September 11	(Russia) Balakovo	Russian Team Speedway Cup Final Round 3			
October 5	(Russia) Vladivostok	Russian Team Speedway Cup Final Round 4			
May 26	(Russia)	Russian Team U-21 Speedway Championship Round 1			
June 1	(Russia) Togliatti	Russian Team U-21 Speedway Championship Round 2			

=== Other Events ===
==== Memorials ====
Date	Place	Event	Winner	Second place	Third place
February 3	(Australia) Perth	Rob Woffinden Classic	(Australia) Justin Sedgmen	(Australia) Jaimon Lidsey	(United Kingdom) Tai Woffinden
March 18	(England) Manchester	Peter Craven Memorial	(Australia) Brady Kurtz	(United Kingdom) Dan Bewley	(Australia) Max Fricke
March 23	(Poland) Częstochowa	Bronisław Idzikowski and Marek Czerny Memorial	(Australia) Jason Doyle	(Poland) Bartosz Zmarzlik	(Denmark) Leon Madsen
March 24	(Poland) Bydgoszcz	35th Criterium of Polish Speedway Leagues Aces	(Poland) Bartosz Zmarzlik	(Poland) Szymon Woźniak	(Poland) Artem Laguta
March 30	(Poland) Gorzów Wielkopolski	18th Edward Jancarz Memorial	(Poland) Bartosz Zmarzlik	(Poland) Kacper Woryna	(Poland) Piotr Pawlicki
April 1	(Poland) Opole	Golden Helmet Final - Jerzy Szczakiel Memorial	(Poland) Dominik Kubera	(Poland) Kacper Woryna	(Poland) Przemysław Pawlicki
April 6	(Poland) Leszno	74th Alfred Smoczyk Memorial	(Poland) Dominik Kubera	(Poland) Grzegorz Zengota	(Poland) Krzysztof Buczkowski
April 7	(Poland) Gdańsk	6th Henryk Żyto Memorial	Event was cancelled		
May 18	(Czech Republic) Slaný	Memoriál Antonína Vildeho			
June 2	(Slovenia) Krško	Złoty Herb Gminy Krško – Puchar Franca Babiča			
October 7	(Czech Republic) Prague	55. Tomíčkův memoriál			
October 19	(Slovenia) Krško	AMD Krško Cup – Memorial Matije Duha			

==== Other Individual Events (Australia & Europe) ====
Date	Place	Event	Winner	Second place	Third place
Nov. 25, 2023	(Australia) Brandon	Queensland Championship	(Australia) Josh Grajczonek	(Australia) Tate Zischke	(Australia) Declan Kennedy
Nov. 25, 2023	(Australia) Undera	Victorian Championship	(Australia) Fraser Bowes		
Dec. 16, 2023	(Australia) Gillman	South Australian Championship	(Australia) Justin Sedgmen	(Australia) Fraser Bowes	(New Zealand) Jake Turner
Dec. 26, 2023	(Australia) Mildura	Jason Lyons Solo Trophy	(Australia) Max Fricke	(Australia) Jaimon Lidsey	(Australia) Fraser Bowes
Dec. 29, 2023	(Australia) Gillman	Gillman Solo Championship	(Australia) Justin Sedgmen	(Australia) Michael West	(Australia) Fraser Bowes
Dec. 29, 2023	(Australia) Brisbane	Australian Speedway Centenury	(Australia) Jaimon Lidsey	(Australia) Max Fricke	(Australia) Jason Doyle
January 20	Isle of Wight	Winter Warmer - Test event senior 500cc	(England) Chad Wirtzfeld	(England) Eli Meadows	(England) Jamie Sealey
January 26	(Australia) Mildura	Phil Crump Solo Classic	(Australia) Justin Sedgmen	(Australia) Brady Kurtz	(Australia) Jaimon Lidsey
February 17	(Australia) Perth	Western Australia Championship	(Australia) Luke Killeen	(Australia) Declan Knowles	(Australia) Daniel Winchester
March 9	(Germany) Werlte	Individual Tournament U21 (500cc)	(Germany) Patrick Hyjek	(Germany) Louis Tebbe	(Germany) Tim Lumpitzsch
March 10	(France) Lamothe-Landerron	Speedway International	Event was cancelled		
March 13	(England) Poole	Kyle Newman Testimonial	Event was postponed		
March 14	(England) Sheffield	Kyle Howarth Testimonial	Event was postponed		
March 16	(England) Workington	Ben Fund Bonanza	Event was postponed		
March 17	(England) Middlesbrough	Charles Wright Testimonial	(Sweden) Freddie Lindgren	(Germany) Erik Riss	(Australia) Ben Cook
March 30	(Germany) Güstrow	Internationaler Osterpokal	(Sweden) Timo Lahti	(Denmark) Nicolai Klindt	(France) David Bellego
March 31	(Germany) Neuenknick	European Open	(Poland) Krystian Pieszczek	(Netherlands) Mika Meijer	(Poland) Sebastian Szostak
April 1	(Poland) Kraków	Puchar Prezydenta Miasta Kraków	(Sweden) Jacob Thorssell	(Denmark) Peter Kildemand	(Poland) Daniel Kaczmarek
April 5	(Poland) Łódź	Indiv. International Champ. of Ekstraliga	(Poland) Bartosz Zmarzlik	(Australia) Jason Doyle	(Sweden) Freddie Lindgren
April 13	(Denmark) Holstebro	BP Talent Cup	(Denmark) Rasmus Pedersen	(Denmark) Mikkel Andersen	(Sweden) Jonatan Grahn
April 13	(Germany) Wittstock	Pokal der Stadt Wittstock	(Germany) Lukas Baumann	(Germany) Steven Mauer	(Germany) Ben Iken
May 4	(Germany) Moorwinkelsdamm	Master of Speedway	(Poland) Kacper Gomólski	(Poland) Patryk Wojdyło	(Poland) Robert Chmiel
May 10	(Scotland) Edinburgh	Caledonian Riders Championship			
May 13	(Russia) Balakovo	Russian Competition			
May 16	(Russia) Togliatti	Russian Competition			
May 18	(Russia) Oktyabrsky	Regional Competition			
May 18	(Russia) Balakovo	Regional Competition			
May 18	(Denmark) Holstebro	JA Youngstars	(Denmark) Mikkel Andersen	(Denmark) Emil Pørtner	(Denmark) Esben Hjerrild
May 18	(Romania) Brăila	CSM Brăila Cup			
May 19	(Germany) Moorwinkelsdamm	Master of Speedway	(Denmark) Nicolai Klindt	(Poland) Adrian Gała	(Germany) Kevin Wölbert
May 25	(Poland) Piła	Bronze Helmet Final			
May 29	(Poland) Grudziądz	Silver Helmet Final			
June 14	(Slovenia) Lendava	Individual Tournament			
June 15	(Finland) Seinäjoki	Seinäjoki Speedway			
June 16	(Belgium) Heusden-Zolder	Masters of Helzold			
July 26	(Denmark) Herning	Veteran Games			
July 26	(Denmark) Brovst	Sommerchallenge			
August 4	(England) Leicester	National League Riders’ Development Series			
August 20	(Hungary) Debrecen	49th Grand Prix of Debrecen			
September 1	(England) Poole	Richard Lawson Testimonial			
September 1	(Belgium) Heusden-Zolder	Golden Helmet of Helzold			
September 8	(Austria) Mureck	International Race			
September 21	(Netherlands) Veenoord	Gouden Helm Speedway			
September 29	(Slovenia) Lendava	Individual Tournament			
October 5	(Czech Republic) Pardubice	50. Zlatá Stuha			
October 6	(Czech Republic) Pardubice	76. Zlatá Přilba			
October 12	(Czech Republic) Kopřivnice	Individual tournament			
October 12	(Austria) Sankt Johann	International Race			
October 13	(Austria) Mureck	International Race			

==== Other Individual Events (United States) ====
Date	Place	Event	Winner	Second place	Third place
February 24	(United States) City of Industry	Big Kids Gumball Rally Scratch Main	(United States) Max Ruml	(United States) Broc Nicol	(United States) Slater Lightcap
April 6	(United States) Bakersfield	King of Kern - Scratch Main	(United States) Max Ruml	(United States) Billy Janniro	(United States) Alex Martin
April 20	(United States) Perris	Season Opener - First Division	(United States) Max Ruml	(United States) Russell Green	(United States) Broc Nicol
May 4	(United States) Perris	Speedway Round 2 - First Division	(United States) Broc Nicol	(United States) Russell Green	(United States) Austin Novratil
May 4	(United States) Nichols	Patrick Ahlund Spring Classic	(United States) Spencer Portararo	(United States) Adam Mittl	(United States) Levi Harris
May 10	(United States) Auburn	Season Opener - Division I Scratch Main Event	(United States) Billy Janniro	(United States) Broc Nicol	(United States) Blake Borello
May 11	(United States) Costa Mesa	Harley Night #1 - Scratch Main Event	(United States) Broc Nicol	(United States) Max Ruml	(United States) Austin Novratil
May 17	(United States) Auburn	Speedway - Team Challenge 1 - Division I Scratch Main Event	(United States) Billy Janniro	(United States) Blake Borello	(United States) Slater Lightcap
May 18	(United States) Costa Mesa	Knobby Night - Scratch Main Event	(United States) Max Ruml	(United States) Austin Novratil	(United States) Slater Lightcap
May 24	(United States) Auburn	Speedway - Sidecars Round 1	(United States) Louie Mersaroli	(United States) Billy Janniro	(United States) Russell Green
May 24–26	(United States) Nichols	50th Anniversary National Championships			
May 31	(United States) Auburn	Speedway - Team Challenge 2			
June 1	(United States) City of Industry	Season Opener	(United States) Max Ruml	(United States) Russell Green	(United States) Broc Nicol
June 7	(United States) Auburn	Speedway - Legends & Vintage Night	(United States) Billy Janniro	(United States) Charlie Trana	(United States) Timmy Dion
June 8	(United States) City of Industry	Connor Penhall Memorial Cup	(United States) Max Ruml	(United States) Broc Nicol	(United States) Louie Mersaroli
June 8	(United States) Nichols	Jagger Roberts Race			
June 14	(United States) Auburn	Speedway - Sidecars Round 2	(United States) Broc Nicol	(United States) Bart Bast	(United States) Charlie Trana
June 15	(United States) Costa Mesa	Harley Night #2	(United States) Austin Novratil	(United States) Slater Lightcap	(United States) Max Ruml
June 19	(United States) City of Industry	British Bike Night			
June 21	(United States) Auburn	Speedway - Team Challenge 3			
June 22	(United States) Nichols	Hurricane Hank Basset Cup			
June 28	(United States) Auburn	Speedway 25 Lap Main Event			
June 29	(United States) City of Industry	Bruce Flanders Ugly Hawaiian Shirt Night			
June 29	(United States) Greene	TBA			
July 5	(United States) Auburn	Speedway - Sidecars Round 3			
July 12	(United States) Auburn	Speedway - Team Challenge 4			
July 13	(United States) Nichols	Olympique Format			
July 19	(United States) Auburn	NORTH VS SOUTH CHALLENGE			
July 20	(United States) Perris	TBA			
July 20	(United States) Greene	TBA			
July 26	(United States) Auburn	Speedway - Team Challenge 5			
July 27	(United States) City of Industry	Legends and Heros			
July 27	(United States) Nichols	Omar Lightner Cup			
August 2	(United States) Auburn	Speedway - Sidecars Round 4			
August 9	(United States) Auburn	Speedway - Team Challenge Final			
August 10	(United States) Perris	TBA			
August 10	(United States) Nichols	Larry and Kathy McBride Memorial			
August 14	(United States) City of Industry	JR Kurtz Memorial Cup			
August 17	(United States) Auburn	Track Championship - Peewee Championship			
August 24	(United States) City of Industry	47th California State Championship			
August 24	(United States) Nichols	Danny Moonbeam Fallon NYS Championship			
August 31	(United States) Greene	TBA			
September 1	(United States) Nichols	US Open National Championship Finals			
September 7	(United States) Perris	TBA			
September 14	(United States) Auburn	Speedway Best Pairs Championship -Flat Track Stars			
September 14	(United States) Bakersfield	TBA			
September 14	(United States) Costa Mesa	52th Speedway Fair Derby			
September 21	(United States) Nichols	Track Points Championship Final			
September 28	(United States) Costa Mesa	Harley Night Finals			
October 5	(United States) Perris	TBA			
October 6	(United States) Nichols	TBA			
October 12	(United States) Bakersfield	TBA			
October 13	(United States) Nichols	TBA			
November 2	(United States) Bakersfield	TBA			

==== Other Individual Cups ====
Date	Place	Event	Winner	Second place	Third place
March 26	(Czech Republic) Prague	Individual Czech Republic Cup	(Czech Republic) Jan Macek	(Czech Republic) Adam Bednář	(Czech Republic) Hynek Štichauer
May 8	(Czech Republic) Kopřivnice	Individual Czech Republic Cup			
June 2	(Czech Republic) Slaný	Individual Czech Republic Cup			
June 15	(Czech Republic) Březolupy	Individual Czech Republic Cup			
June 23	(Czech Republic) Svitavy	Individual Czech Republic Cup			
June 30	(Czech Republic) Chabařovice	Individual Czech Republic Cup			
July 27	(Czech Republic) Liberec	Individual Czech Republic Cup			
August 25	(Czech Republic) Plzeň	Individual Czech Republic Cup			
TBA	(Poland) Świętochłowice	MACEC Cup			
TBA (probably June)	(Czech Republic) Pardubice	MACEC Cup			
October 12	(Ukraine) Rivne	MACEC Cup			
October 19	(Romania) Brăila	MACEC Cup			
April 21	(Sweden) Gislaved	Swedish Speedway Academy - 500cc	(Sweden) Anton Jansson	(Sweden) Rasmus Karlsson	(Sweden) Theo Bergqvist
May 25/26	(Sweden) Eskilstuna	Swedish Speedway Academy - 500cc			
June 29/30	(Sweden) Kumla	Swedish Speedway Academy - 500cc			
August 24/25	(Sweden) Västervik	Swedish Speedway Academy - 500cc			
September 21/22	(Sweden) Norrköping	Swedish Speedway Academy - 500cc			
April 13	(Poland) Gniezno	Budex International Amateur Speedway Cup; Platinum Group	(Germany) Oliver Petersdorf	(Denmark) John Pedersen	(Czech Republic) Martin Švestka
May 4	(Poland) Wrocław	Budex International Amateur Speedway Cup; Platinum Group			
May 25	(Poland) Rawicz	Budex International Amateur Speedway Cup; Platinum Group			
June 22	(Germany) Berlin	Budex International Amateur Speedway Cup; Platinum Group			
July 20	(Czech Republic) Liberec	Budex International Amateur Speedway Cup; Platinum Group			
August 10	(Poland) Gdańsk	Budex International Amateur Speedway Cup; Platinum Group			
August 31	(Poland) Piła	Budex International Amateur Speedway Cup; Platinum Group			
TBD	TBD	Budex International Amateur Speedway Cup; Platinum Group			
October 5	(Poland) Leszno	Budex International Amateur Speedway Cup; Platinum Group			

==== Team Friendly Matches & Other Team Events ====
Date	Place	Event	Winner	Second place	Third place
December 16, 2023	(Australia) Kurri Kurri	Johnnie Hoskins Founder's Cup	Kurri Cobra 1 (Australia) Chris Holder (Australia) Harry Ryan (Australia) Ryan Douglas (Australia) Tate Zischke (Australia) Sam Masters (Australia) James Pearson (Australia) Lachlan Hayes	Cobra 2 (United Kingdom) Tai Woffinden (Australia) Kane Lawrence (Australia) Jye Etheridge (Australia) Cordell Rogerson (Australia) Josh Pickering (Australia) Bradley Page (Australia) Boyd Hollis	2 teams match
February 17	(United States) Bakersfield	Friendly Match: United States – World	United States; Max Ruml; Broc Nicol; Gino Manzares; Billy Janniro; Luke Becker; Alex Martin; Dillon Ruml; Slater Lightcap	Team World (United Kingdom) Chris Harris (United Kingdom) Tom Brennan (United Kingdom) Leon Flint (Italy) Paco Castagna (Poland) Paweł Trześniewski (Northern Ireland) Austin Novratil (Sweden) Wilbur Hancock (United Kingdom) Daniel Bewley (United States) Russell Green	2 teams match
March 29	(England) Middlesbrough	Tyne-Tees Trophy	Event was postponed		
March 30–31	(England) Middlesbrough	Border Trophy	Berwick (England) Lewis Kerr (England) Danyon Hume (Australia) Jye Etheridge (England) Drew Kemp (Australia) Rory Schlein (England) Freddy Hodder (Denmark) Bastian Borke	Workington (England) Craig Cook (Denmark) Claus Vissing (Finland) Antti Vuolas (Australia) Tate Zischke (Australia) Troy Batchelor (England) Sam McGurk (Germany) Celina Liebmann	2 teams match
March 31	(Germany) Pocking	Traditioneller Speedway 4 Länderkampf	Czech Republic; Daniel Klíma; Jan Macek; Adam Bednář; Jaroslav Vaníček	Germany; Valentin Grobauer; Martin Smolinski; Michael Härtel; Patrick Hyjek	Denmark; Sam Jensen; Bastian Pedersen; Nicklas Aagaard; Tim Sørensen
April 26–27	(Sweden) Vetlanda	Vetlanda Lagcup			
April 28	(Belgium) Heusden-Zolder	Friendly Match: Helzoldstars – Netherlands			2 teams match
May 12	(Poland) Łódź	Mecz Narodów im. H. Skrzydlewskiej			
June 29	(Finland) Varkaus	Suomi sarja			
June 30	(Finland) Varkaus	Suomi sarja			
June 30		Friendly Match: Poland vs			2 teams match
July 6	(Finland) Seinäjoki	Suomi sarja			
July 13	(Italy) Lonigo	Friendly Match: MC Lonigo – AMD Krško			2 teams match
August 6	(Finland) Kuusankoski	Suomi sarja			
August 10	(Finland) Tampere	Suomi sarja			
August 11	(Slovakia) Žarnovica	Friendship Cup			
August 25	(Slovenia) Krško	Friendly Match: AMD Krško – MC Lonigo			2 teams match
TBC	(Finland) Forssa	Suomi sarja			
September 21	(Finland) Pori	Suomi sarja			
October 5	(United States) Auburn	Friendly Match: United States – World			2 teams match

=== Other Mini Track Events ===
Date of Final	Place	Event	Winner	Second place	Third place	Notes
October 19	(Czech Republic) Various	Individual Czech Championships (125cc)				(Note: Series consists of 9 rounds)
August 17	(Poland) Various	Polish Team Championships Group A				
August 17	(Poland) Various	Polish Team Championships Group B				
August 18	(Poland) Various	Individual Polish Cup Group A				
August 18	(Poland) Various	Individual Polish Cup Group B				
September 14	(Poland) Various	Individual Cup of Ekstraliga				
September 15	(Poland) Various	Team Cup of Ekstraliga				
September 21 & 22	(Poland) Bydgoszcz	Polish Pairs Championship Final				(Note: Two day event)
September 28	(Poland) Bydgoszcz	Individual Polish Cup Final				
October 12	(Poland) Rybnik	Polish Team Championships Final				
October 13	(Poland) Various	Individual Polish Championships				
May 3	(Poland) Rybnik	Memoriał Skulskiego	(Poland) Mieszko Mudło	(Poland) Franciszek Szczyrba	(Poland) Michał Głębocki	
June 23	(Poland) Gdańsk	Golden Boy				
August 31	(Poland) Rybnik	Puchar Dyrektora KWK Chwałowice				
September 1	(Poland) Rybnik	Memorial A. Woryny				
October 6	(Poland) Częstochowa	Turniej o Puchar Prezydenta Częstochowy				

== Long track ==
=== 2024 FIM Long Track World Championship ===
Date	Place	Event	Winner	Second place	Third place
June 16	(Germany) Mühldorf	Challenge	(Germany) Erik Riss	(United Kingdom) Zach Wajtknecht	(Denmark) Kenneth Kruse Hansen
May 9	(Germany) Herxheim	Finals #1	(Germany) Martin Smolinski	(United Kingdom) Zach Wajtknecht	(Germany) Lukas Fienhage
July 13	(France) Marmande	Finals #2	(Germany) Lukas Fienhage	(United Kingdom) Zach Wajtknecht	(Germany) Martin Smolinski
August 18	(Germany) Scheeßel	Finals #3	(Germany) Martin Smolinski	(United Kingdom) Chris Harris	(Germany) Lukas Fienhage
September 14	(Germany) Vechta	Finals #4	(Germany) Martin Smolinski	(United Kingdom) Chris Harris	(Germany) Lukas Fienhage
September 22	(Netherlands) Roden	Finals #5	(Germany) Lukas Fienhage	(United Kingdom) Zach Wajtknecht	(Germany) Martin Smolinski
Overall			(Germany) Martin Smolinski	(Germany) Lukas Fienhage	(United Kingdom) Zach Wajtknecht

=== 2024 FIM Long Track of Nations ===
Date	Place	Event	Winner	Second place	Third place
September 7	(France) Morizès	Final			

=== 2024 FIM Long Track under 23 World Cup ===
Date	Place	Event	Winner	Second place	Third place
September 13	(Germany) Vechta	Final	(United Kingdom) Jake Mulford	(France) Steven Labouyrie	(Netherlands) Mika Meijer

=== Individual National Long Track Championships ===
Date of Final	Place	Event	Winner	Second place	Third place	Notes
May 25	(Czech Republic) Mariánské Lázně	2024 International Czech Long Track Championship				
August 24	(Germany) Hertingen	2024 German Long Track Championship	(Germany) Martin Smolinski	(Germany) Stephan Katt	(Germany) Max Dilger	
September 28	(France) Marmande	2024 French Long Track Championship				
TBA	(Finland) Forssa	2024 Finnish Long Track Championship				

=== Other Long Track Races ===
Date of Final	Place	Event	Winner	Second place	Third place
May 1	(Germany) Lübbenau	75. Lübbenauer Sandbahnrennen			
May 5	(Germany) Plattling	Sandbahnrennen			
May 30	(Germany) Altrip	Sandbahnrennen	(Netherlands) Romano Hummel	(Netherlands) Dave Meijerink	(Germany) Lukas Fienhage
June 23	(Germany) Hechthausen	Sandbahnrennen			
June 29	(Germany) Mulmshorn	50 Jahre MSC Mulmshorn			
August 24	(Germany) Hertingen	Langbahn DM Solo & Bahnpokal Gespanne			

== Flat track ==
=== 2024 FIM Flat Track World Championship ===
Date	Place	Event	Winner	Second place	Third place
July 20	(Italy) Boves	Finals #1	(Finland) Lasse Kurvinen	(United Kingdom) Tim Neave	(United States) Sammy Halbert
July 27	(Germany) Meissen	Finals #2	(United States) Sammy Halbert	(Czech Republic) Ervín Krajčovič	(Czech Republic) Ondřej Svědík
August 24	(England) King's Lynn	Finals #3			
September 7	(France) Morizès	Finals #4			
October 5	(Czech Republic) Pardubice	Finals #5			
October 12	(Hungary) Debrecen	Finals #6			
Overall					

=== National Individual Championships - Elimination Races & Partial Rounds ===
Date	Place	Event	Winner	Second place	Third place
May 5	(France) Morizès	Championnat de France Flat-Track Round 1			
May 19	(France) Miramont-de-Guyenne	Championnat de France Flat-Track Round 2			
June 23	(France) Saint-Macaire	Championnat de France Flat-Track Round 3			
June 29	(France) Mâcon	Championnat de France Flat-Track Round 4			
October 20	(France) Miramont-de-Guyenne	Championnat de France Flat-Track Round 5			
May 25 & 26	(Germany) Wolfslake	German Flat Track KROWDRACE Series Round 1			
June 8 & 9	(Germany) Brokstedt	German Flat Track KROWDRACE Series Round 2			
June 22 & 23	(Netherlands) Lelystad	German Flat Track KROWDRACE Series Round 3			
July 20 & 21	(Germany) Ludwigslust	German Flat Track KROWDRACE Series Round 4			
April 13 & 14	(England) Workington	British Flat Track Championship Round 1	(England) Tim Neave	(Spain) Gerard Bailo	(England) Jack Bell
May 11 & 12	(England) Greenfield	British Flat Track Championship Round 2	(England) Tim Neave	(England) Jack Bell	(England) Adam James
July 6 & 7	(England) Mallory Park	British Flat Track Championship Round 3	(England) Jack Bell	(Spain) Gerard Bailo	(England) Adam James
August 10	(Wales) Ammanford	British Flat Track Championship Round 4	(England) Jack Bell	(Spain) Gerard Bailo	(Spain) Eric Reverté
August 11	(Wales) Ammanford	British Flat Track Championship Round 5	(England) Jack Bell	(Spain) Eric Reverté	(Spain) Gerard Bailo
April 20/21	(Netherlands) Roden	Dutch Flat Track Championship Round 1			
May 18	(Netherlands) Noordeloos	Dutch Flat Track Championship Round 2			
June 1/2	(Netherlands) Blijham	Dutch Flat Track Championship Round 3			
August 31	(Netherlands) Siddeburen	Dutch Flat Track Championship Round 4			
September 28/29	(Netherlands) Lelystad	Dutch Flat Track Championship Round 5			
April 28	(Italy) Ravenna	Italian Flat Track Championship Round 1			
June 29	(Italy) Lonigo	Italian Flat Track Championship Round 2			
June 30	(Italy) Lonigo	Italian Flat Track Championship Round 3			
July 6	(Italy) Terenzano	Italian Flat Track Championship Round 4			
July 7	(Italy) Terenzano	Italian Flat Track Championship Round 5			
September 21	(Italy) Boves	Italian Flat Track Championship Round 6			
September 22	(Italy) Boves	Italian Flat Track Championship Round 7			
October 27	(Italy) Ravenna	Italian Flat Track Championship Round 8			

=== Other Events ===
Date	Place	Event	Winner	Second place	Third place
May 11	(Finland) Hyvinkää	Viking Flat Track Cup			

== Grass track ==
=== 2024 European Grasstrack Championship ===
Date	Place	Event	Winner	Second place	Third place
June 2	(Germany) Bielefeld	Semi Final 1	(Germany) Lukas Fienhage	(United Kingdom) Chris Harris	(Denmark) Jacob Bukhave
June 23	(France) Saint-Macaire	Semi Final 2	(Netherlands) Romano Hummel	(Denmark) Kenneth Kruse Hansen	(United Kingdom) Paul Cooper
July 6	(France) Tayac	Final	(United Kingdom) Chris Harris	(Netherlands) Dave Meijerink	(Germany) Lukas Fienhage

=== 2024 European Grasstrack Sidecar Championship ===
Date	Place	Event	Winner	Second place	Third place
August 10	(Germany) Bad Hersfeld	Qualifying Round	(France) Remi Valladon/Dylan Fourcade	(Germany) Manuel Meier/Lena Siebert	(Germany) Immanuel Schramm/Nadin Löffler
August 31	(Netherlands) Uithuizen	Final			

=== Other Grass Track Races ===
==== Great Britain ====
Date of Final	Place	Event	Winner	Second place	Third place
August 3	(England) Southend	Youth & GT140 British Championship			
August 18	(England) Mid Cornwall	ACU Old & New Sidecar Gold Cup			
September 8	(England) Cheshire	British Upright			
September 15	(England) Astra	British Masters			
September 29	(England) Frittenden	British Championship			
April 20	(England) Malpas	Formula Grasstrack Championship			
May 4	(England) Alveley	Formula Grasstrack Championship			
June 1	(England) Ledbury	Formula Grasstrack Championship			
June 15	(England) Pontesbury	Formula Grasstrack Championship			
July 27	(England) Hampton Hall	Formula Grasstrack Championship			
August 24	(England) Hampton Hall	Formula Grasstrack Championship			
September 21	(England) Alveley	Formula Grasstrack Championship			
October 5	(England) Pontesbury	Formula Grasstrack Championship			
March 30	(England) Tallington	Titans of Tallington			
March 31	(England) Tallington	Titans of Tallington			

==== Netherlands ====
Seniors KNMV

Date of Final	Place	Event	Winner	Second place	Third place
April 1	(Netherlands) Balkbrug	Grasbaanrace Balkbrug 2024	(Netherlands) Romano Hummel	(Netherlands) Dave Meijerink	(Netherlands) Henry van der Steen
April 14	(Netherlands) Vries	Dutch Open	(Netherlands) Dave Meijerink	(Netherlands) Romano Hummel	(Netherlands) Henry van der Steen
May 25	(Netherlands) Joure	Dutch Open	(Netherlands) Dave Meijerink	(Netherlands) Romano Hummel	(Finland) Henri Ahlbom
May 26	(Netherlands) Eenrum	Dutch Open	(Netherlands) Dave Meijerink	(Netherlands) Romano Hummel	(United Kingdom) Charley Powell
July 21	(Netherlands) Noordwolde	Dutch Open	(Finland) Henri Ahlbom	(Netherlands) William Kruit	(Netherlands) Dave Meijerink
August 23	(Netherlands) Staphorst	Dutch Open			
May 20	(Netherlands) Stadskanaal	Internationale grasbaanraces			
June 22	(Netherlands) Opende	Internationale grasbaanraces			
July 20	(Netherlands) Aduard	Internationale grasbaanraces	(Netherlands) Dave Meijerink	(United Kingdom) Zach Wajtknecht	(Netherlands) William Kruit
August 18	(Netherlands) Eenrum	Internationale grasbaanraces			

Jeugd & Nationaal KNMV

Date of Final	Place	Event	Winners
April 13	(Netherlands) Vries	Jeugd & Nationaal	(Netherlands) G.-J. Valk (250cc), (Netherlands) J. O. Loonstra (500cc), (Netherlands) Ch. Schoo (Veterans)
April 20	(Netherlands) Joure	Jeugd & Nationaal	
May 3	(Netherlands) Westeremden	Jeugd & Nationaal	
June 2	(Netherlands) Stadskanaal	Jeugd & Nationaal	
June 8	(Netherlands) Loppersum	Jeugd & Nationaal	
June 21	(Netherlands) Opende	Jeugd & Nationaal	
August 17	(Netherlands) Eenrum	Jeugd & Nationaal	
August 24	(Netherlands) Staphorst	Jeugd & Nationaal	
September 8	(Netherlands) Noordwolde	Jeugd & Nationaal	
September 15	(Netherlands) Annen	Jeugd & Nationaal	

VTBM

Date of Final	Place	Event	Winner	Second place	Third place
May 4	(Netherlands) Westeremden	VTBM 2024 Season			
May 11	(Netherlands) Bitgummole	VTBM 2024 Season			
June 1	(Netherlands) Woudsend	VTBM 2024 Season			
June 15	(Netherlands) Joure	VTBM 2024 Season			
June 16	(Netherlands) Roden	VTBM 2024 Season			
July 7	(Netherlands) Vledderveen	VTBM 2024 Season			
July 14	(Netherlands) Anloo	VTBM 2024 Season			
September 7	(Netherlands) Kuinre	VTBM 2024 Season			
September 28	(Netherlands) Noordwolde	VTBM 2024 Season			
October 6	(Netherlands) Opende	VTBM 2024 Season			

== Ice speedway ==
=== 2024 FIM Ice Speedway World Championship ===
Date	Place	Event	Winner	Second place	Third place
January 27	(Sweden) Örnsköldsvik	Qualifying round	(Germany) Max Niedermaier	(Finland) Heikki Huusko	(Finland) Max Koivula
March 23	(Germany) Inzell	Finals #1 Race 1	(Germany) Max Niedermaier	(Sweden) Martin Haarahiltunen	(Finland) Heikki Huusko
March 24	(Germany) Inzell	Finals #1 Race 2	(Finland) Aki Ala-Riihimäki	(Sweden) Martin Haarahiltunen	(Finland) Heikki Huusko
April 6	(Netherlands) Heerenveen	Finals #2 Race 1	(Sweden) Martin Haarahiltunen	(Germany) Max Niedermaier	(Sweden) Jimmy Olsen
April 7	(Netherlands) Heerenveen	Finals #2 Race 2	(Sweden) Stefan Svensson	(Sweden) Jimmy Olsen	(Finland) Heikki Huusko
Overall			(Sweden) Martin Haarahiltunen	(Germany) Max Niedermaier	(Finland) Heikki Huusko

=== 2024 Texom European Individual Ice Speedway Championship ===
Date	Place	Event	Winner	Second place	Third place
February 24	(Poland) Sanok	Finals Race 1	(Austria) Franz Zorn	(Germany) Max Niedermaier	(Sweden) Jimmy Olsen
February 25	(Poland) Sanok	Finals Race 2	(Austria) Franz Zorn	(Sweden) Jimmy Olsen	(Germany) Max Niedermaier
Overall			(Austria) Franz Zorn	(Sweden) Jimmy Olsen	(Germany) Max Niedermaier

=== National Ice Speedway Championships ===
Date	Nation	Event	Winner	Second place	Third place
February 10	(Finland) Lahti	Finnish Individual Championship	(Finland) Aki Ala-Riihimäki	(Finland) Heikki Huusko	(Finland) Max Koivula
Dec. 16–17, 2023	(Russia) Ufa	Russian Individual Championship Semifinal #1	(Russia) Nikita Bogdanov	(Russia) Dinar Valeev	(Russia) Nikita Toloknov
Dec. 16–17, 2023	(Russia) Shadrinsk	Russian Individual Championship Semifinal #2	(Russia) Dmitry Solyannikov	(Russia) Dmitry Koltakov	(Russia) Dmitry Khomitsevich
Dec. 23–24, 2023	(Russia) Togliatti	Russian Individual Championship Final #1	(Russia) Nikita Bogdanov	(Russia) Dinar Valeev	(Russia) Dmitry Solyannikov
January 6–7	(Russia) Kamensk-Uralsky	Russian Individual Championship Final #2	(Russia) Dmitry Koltakov	(Russia) Dinar Valeev	(Russia) Nikita Bogdanov
January 13–14	(Russia) Shadrinsk	Russian Individual Championship Final #3	(Russia) Dinar Valeev	(Russia) Dmitry Solyannikov	(Russia) Nikita Bogdanov
January 20–21	(Russia) Saransk	Russian Individual Championship Final #4	(Russia) Nikita Bogdanov	(Russia) Dmitry Solyannikov	(Russia) Dinar Valeev
February 3–4	(Russia) Vyatskiye Polyany	Russian Individual Championship Final #5	(Russia) Nikita Bogdanov	(Russia) Dinar Valeev	(Russia) Dmitry Koltakov
February 17–18	(Russia) Krasnogorsk	Russian Individual Championship Superfinal	(Russia) Nikita Bogdanov	(Russia) Dmitry Koltakov	(Russia) Sergey Makarov
February 18	(Russia) Various	Russian Individual Championship Overall	(Russia) Nikita Bogdanov	(Russia) Dinar Valeev	(Russia) Dmitry Solyannikov
February 10	(Sweden) Gävle	Swedish Individual Championship	(Sweden) Stefan Svensson	(Sweden) Robert Henderson	(Sweden) Jimmy Olsen
February 17	(Sweden) Östersund	Nordic Individual Championship	(Finland) Heikki Huusko	(Sweden) Stefan Svensson	(Sweden) Jimmy Olsen

=== National Team Ice Speedway Championships ===
==== Superleague ====
Date	Place	Event	Winner	Second place	Third place
January 5	(Sweden) Östersund	Round 1	Strömsunds MC (Austria) Franz Zorn (Germany) Hans Weber (Netherlands) Jasper Iwema	ÖMK Rundbana (Sweden) Stefan Svensson (Czech Republic) Andrej Diviš (Sweden) Jimmy Hörnell	Jämtarna Östersund (Italy) Luca Bauer (Switzerland) Beat Dobler (Austria) Charly Ebner (Norway) Jo Sætre
January 6	(Sweden) Strömsund	Round 2	Strömsunds MC (Austria) Franz Zorn (Germany) Hans Weber (Netherlands) Jasper Iwema	Jämtarna Östersund (Italy) Luca Bauer (Switzerland) Beat Dobler (Austria) Charly Ebner (Norway) Jo Sætre	ÖMK Rundbana (Sweden) Stefan Svensson (Czech Republic) Andrej Diviš (Sweden) Jimmy Hörnell
January 7	(Sweden) Örnsköldsvik	Round 3	Inn Isar Racing Team (Germany) Markus Jell (Sweden) Ove Ledström (Germany) Max Niedermeier	Strömsunds MC (Austria) Franz Zorn (Germany) Hans Weber (Netherlands) Jasper Iwema	ÖMK Rundbana (Sweden) Stefan Svensson (Czech Republic) Andrej Diviš (Sweden) Jimmy Hörnell
January 13	(Sweden) Gävle	Round 4	Strömsunds MC (Austria) Franz Zorn (Germany) Hans Weber (Sweden) Jimmy Olsen (Netherlands) Jasper Iwema	Inn Isar Racing Team (Sweden) Ove Ledström (Germany) Max Niedermeier (Germany) Markus Jell (Austria) Philip Lageder	Jämtarna Östersund (Austria) Charly Ebner (Switzerland) Beat Dobler (Italy) Luca Bauer (Norway) Jo Sætre
January 14	(Sweden) Bollnäs	Round 5	Strömsunds MC (Austria) Franz Zorn (Germany) Hans Weber (Sweden) Jimmy Olsen (Netherlands) Jasper Iwema	Inn Isar Racing Team (Sweden) Ove Ledström (Germany) Max Niedermeier (Germany) Markus Jell	SMK Gävle (Finland) Heikki Huusko (Germany) Maximilian Niedermeier (Germany) Benedikt Monn
Overall			Strömsunds MC	Inn Isar Racing Team	Jämtarna Östersund

==== Allsvenskan ====
Date	Place	Event	Winner	Second place	Third place
January 20	(Sweden) Gävle	Round 1	ÖMK Rundbana (Sweden) Martin Börjegren (Netherlands) Sebastian Reitsma (Norway) Jo Sætre (Finland) Atte Suolammi	Bockarna Bollnäs (Sweden) Mats Svensson (Sweden) Leon Kramer (Germany) Marc Geyer (Germany) Finn Loheider	SMK Gävle (Finland) Jani-Pekka Koivula (Sweden) Martin Hellström (Sweden) Isak Dekkerhus (Sweden) Emil Lingvall
January 21	(Sweden) Bollnäs	Round 2	ÖMK Rundbana (Sweden) Martin Börjegren (Netherlands) Sebastian Reitsma (Norway) Jo Sætre (Finland) Atte Suolammi	Strömsunds MC (Sweden) Seppo Siira (Sweden) Thomas Ekström (Sweden) Hans-Olof Olsen (Sweden) Jimmy Olsen	Bockarna Bollnäs (Germany) Marc Geyer (Sweden) Mats Svensson (Sweden) Leon Kramer (Germany) Finn Loheider
February 3	(Sweden) Strömsund	Round 3	Strömsunds MC (Sweden) Hans-Olof Olsen (Sweden) Joakim Söderström (Sweden) Annica Karlsson (Sweden) Jimmy Olsen	ÖMK Rundbana (Sweden) Martin Börjegren (Netherlands) Sebastian Reitsma (Norway) Jo Sætre (Finland) Atte Suolammi	SMK Gävle (Sweden) Seppo Siira (Sweden) Emil Lingvall (Sweden) Martin Hellström (Sweden) Isak Dekkerhus
February 4	(Sweden) Örnsköldsvik	Round 3	ÖMK Rundbana (Sweden) Martin Börjegren (Netherlands) Sebastian Reitsma (Norway) Jo Sætre (Finland) Atte Suolammi	Strömsunds MC (Sweden) Hans-Olof Olsen (Sweden) Joakim Söderström (Sweden) Annica Karlsson (Sweden) Jimmy Olsen	SMK Gävle (Germany) Marc Geyer (Sweden) Emil Lingvall (Sweden) Martin Hellström (Sweden) Isak Dekkerhus
Overall			ÖMK Rundbana	Strömsunds MC	SMK Gävle

=== Other Ice Speedway Races ===
Date	Place	Event	Winner	Second place	Third place
March 16	(Sweden) Solberg	International Tournament	(Sweden) Stefan Svensson	(Sweden) Jimmy Hörnell	(Norway) Jo Saetre
April 5	(Netherlands) Heerenveen	Roelof Thijs Bokaal	(Netherlands) Jasper Iwema	(Netherlands) Sebastian Reitsma	(Norway) Jo Saetre
