= 2024 French speedway season =

2024 season of motorcycle speedway in France

The 2024 French Speedway season is the 2024 season of motorcycle speedway in France. The season will run from early March to late October.

== Individual ==
=== French Individual Speedway Championship ===
The 2024 French Individual Speedway Championship is the 2024 version of French Individual Speedway Championship. Final of this event is scheduled to take place on 29 June in Mâcon.

Pos.	Rider	Club	Total
1			
2			
3			
4			
5			
6			
7			
8			
9			
10			
11			
12			
13			
14			
15			
16			
17			
18			

== Team ==
=== Team Championship ===
The 2024 Ligue Nationale de Speedway is the 2024 edition of the Team French Championship to determine the gold medal winner (champion of France). Teams finishing second and third were awarded silver and bronze medals respectively.

=== Ligue Nationale de Speedway ===
The Ligue Nationale de Speedway season will run from 30 March to October.

Pos	Team	P	#1	#2	#3	#4	Pts
1	Morizès Moto Club	2	1st	2nd			7
2	MC Iron Deer Val de Guyenne	2	4th	1st			5
3	MCR Les Black Panthers La Réole	2	2nd	4th			5
4	MC Marmande	2	3rd	3rd			4

==== Calendar ====
#	Date	Place	Winner	2nd place	3rd place	4th place	Notes
1	March 30	Marmande	Morizès (37 pts)	La Réole (34 pts)	Marmande (30 pts)	Miramont (24 pts)	
2	April 13	Morizès	Miramont (35 pts)	Morizès (35 pts)	Marmande (33 pts)	La Réole (25 pts)	
3	July 27	La Réole					
4	August 17	Miramont-de-Guyenne					
Final	TBA	TBA					

==== Leading averages ====
	Rider	Team	Av. event	Av. heat
1	(Finland) Tero Aarnio	La Réole	15.00	3.000
2	(France) Steven Goret	Miramont-de-Guyenne	14.00	2.333
3	(Germany) Lukas Fienhage	Morizès	12.00	2.400
3	(Australia) Fraser Bowes	Morizès	12.00	2.400
3	(France) Dimitri Bergé	Marmande	12.00	2.400

== Squads ==
Morizès Moto Club

- (Germany) Lukas Fienhage
- (Australia) Fraser Bowes
- (France) Mathias Trésarrieu
- (France) Tino Bouin

MC Marmande

- (France) Dimitri Bergé
- (United Kingdom) Jake Mulford
- (France) Stéphane Trésarrieu
- (France) Thomas Valladon
- (France) Noah Urda

MCR Les Black Panthers La Réole

- (Finland) Tero Aarnio
- (Czech Republic) Hynek Štichauer
- (France) Jordan Dubernard
- (France) Théo Ugoni
- (France) Matys Sambarrey

MC Iron Deer Val de Guyenne

- (France) Steven Goret
- (Germany) Max Dilger
- (France) Steven Labouyrie
- (France) Philippe Bergé
- (France) Téo Tauzin
- (Italy) Nicolas Vicentin (guest) (Note: Guest rider in Marmande)
