= 2024 Australian Individual Speedway Championship =

Australian motorcycle speedway championship

The 2024 Australian Individual Speedway Championship was a motorcycle speedway competition organised by Motorcycling Australia (MA) for the Australian Individual Speedway Championship. The event was held over five rounds.

Rohan Tungate won his second Australian title.

== Rounds ==
Round	Date	Venue	Winner
1	4 January	North Brisbane Speedway, Banyo	Max Fricke
2	7 January	Loxford Park, Kurri Kurri	Rohan Tungate
3	9 January	Diamond Park, Wodonga	Max Fricke
4	11 January	Olympic Park, Mildura	Brady Kurtz
5	13 January	Gillman Speedway, Adelaide	Brady Kurtz

== Final classification ==
Pos.	Rider	NBS	OLY	DP	LOX	GIL	Total
Gold	Rohan Tungate	16	14	11	16	13	70
Silver	Max Fricke	15	12	16	16	8	67
Bronze	Jack Holder	12	12	14	13	12	61+3
4	Jaimon Lidsey	15	8	13	12	13	61+2
5	Brady Kurtz	8	8	8	16	17	57
6	Ben Cook	6	8	10	8	10	42
7	Chris Holder	10	8	9	4	11	42
8	Josh Pickering	12	7	8	6	7	41
9	Sam Masters	7	8	9	10	7	41
10	Ryan Douglas	8	8	13	7	4	40
11	Zach Cook	4	9	6	5	4	28
12	Keynan Rew	5	2	6	5	5	22
13	James Pearson	7	4	4	0	3	18
14	Michael West	1	4	1	1	7	14
15	Fraser Bowes	1	3	0	4	3	11
16	Justin Sedgmen	-	-	-	9	-	9
17	Tate Zischke	5	-	-	-	-	5
18	Jye Etheridge	-	4	-	-	-	4
19	Jack Morrison	-	-	3	-	-	3
20	Jake Turner	-	-	-	-	1	1

== See also ==
- Australian Individual Speedway Championship
- Australia national speedway team
- Sports in Australia
