= 2012 Australian Individual Speedway Championship =

Australian motorcycle speedway championship

The 2012 Australian Individual Speedway Championship was a motorcycle speedway competition organised by Motorcycling Australia (MA) for the Australian Individual Speedway Championship. The event was held over three rounds.

Chris Holder won his fourth championship.

== Rounds ==
Round	Date	Venue	Winner
1	7 January	North Brisbane Speedway, Banyo	Chris Holder
2	14 January	Loxford Park Speedway, Kurri Kurri	Chris Holder
3	21 January	Gillman Speedway, Adelaide	Chris Holder

== Final classification ==
Pos.	Rider	Total
Gold	Chris Holder	60
Silver	Davey Watt	53
Bronze	Cameron Woodward	49
4	Sam Masters	48
5	Rohan Tungate	45
6	Justin Sedgmen	41
7	Taylor Poole	40
8	Cory Gathercole	38
9	Todd Kurtz	29
10	Jake Anderson	22
11	Michael Dyer	17
12	James Holder	19
13	Robert Ksiezak	18
14	Daine Stephens	16
15	Kozza Smith	9
16	Joey Ringwood	9
17	Brenton Barnfield	7
18	Harley Horwood	6
19	Troy Batchelor	2

== See also ==
- Australian Individual Speedway Championship
- Australia national speedway team
- Sports in Australia
