= Loxford Park Speedway =

Motorcycle speedway venue in Australia

- Location: 73–81 Dickson Road, Loxford, Kurri Kurri, New South Wales
- Coordinates: 32°47′29″S 151°29′18″E
- Capacity: 5,000
- Surface: Dolomite

Tenants
- motorcycle speedway

The Loxford Park Speedway is a motorcycle speedway track located in the area of Loxford, near Kurri Kurri in New South Wales, Australia. It is home to the Kurri Kurri Speedway Club and the Kurri Cobras. Loxford Park also has a 135 m (148 yd) junior track, built on the infield of the main track with the junior track joining onto the main straight and sharing the start-finish line. The site also hosts sidecar racing.

== History ==
Construction of the 320 m (350 yd) track commenced in 2008, with the speedway opening later that year giving NSW a second full-time motorcycle speedway (the other being the Gosford Speedway, though there were also other tracks including the Nepean Speedway, in north west Sydney and the rarely used Newcastle Showground).

Loxford Park held its first championship meeting in 2010/11, when it hosted the New South Wales Individual Speedway Championship which saw reigning Australian Champion Chris Holder win his fifth NSW Championship in six years. Loxford Park then hosted the first of two rounds in the 2011/12 NSW Championship before being the sole host in 2012/13, 2013/14 and 2014/15.

In 2011, Loxford Park hosted the opening round of the four round Australian Solo Championship and hosted the final round of the 2015 Australian Championship on 10 January. Both the final round and the championship were won by local (Newcastle) rider Jason Doyle. Loxford also hosted the 2012, 2013 and 2015 Australian Under-21 Championships. The speedway has also hosted the NSW Under-21 Championship.

In 2012, it hosted its first Australian Sidecar Championship, won by Darrin Treloar for a record sixth time and his passenger Simon Cohrs. The 2014 championship was also held at the speedway with NSW pair Grant Bond and Glen Cox winning their first national championship. Loxford Park also hosts a round of the Sidecar Grand Slam series, which attracts some of the best riders and passengers from around Australia, New Zealand, the United States and the United Kingdom.

The junior speedway track has also hosted both the NSW and Australian Under-16 Championships. The 2012 Australian Under-16 Championship saw an all-NSW podium with Brady Kurtz defeating Jack Holder and Lawson Walters. Loxford is also the site of the Todd Wiltshire Cup for junior solo riders. The cup is named for the former NSW and Australian champion who finished third in the 1990 World Championship. The speedway also hosts the Jason Crump Invitational meeting each December on Boxing Day, in honour of Australia's only triple Speedway World Champion.

The venue continued to host major events and held a final round of both the 2023 Australian Speedway Championship and the 2024 Australian Speedway Championship.

== Major events hosted ==
Australian Solo Championship

- 2011 – Round 1
- 2012 – Round 2
- 2013 – Round 3
- 2014 – Round 1
- 2015 – Round 4
- 2016 – Round 1
- 2017 – Round 4
- 2018 – Round 1
- 2019 – Round 5
- 2023 – Round 3
- 2024 – Round 2

Australian Under-21 Championship

- 2012 – (New South Wales) Taylor Poole
- 2013 – (Victoria (state)) Max Fricke
- 2015 – (Victoria (state)) Max Fricke
- 2017 – (Victoria (state)) Max Fricke
