= 2023 Australian Individual Speedway Championship =

Australian motorcycle speedway championship

The 2023 Australian Individual Speedway Championship was a motorcycle speedway competition organised by Motorcycling Australia (MA) for the Australian Individual Speedway Championship. The event was held over four rounds.

Jack Holder won his first Australian title.

== Rounds ==
Round	Date	Venue	Winner
1	3 January	Gillman Speedway, Adelaide	Jason Doyle
2	7 January	Diamond Park, Wodonga	Jason Doyle
3	9 January	Loxford Park, Kurri Kurri	Jason Doyle
4	11 January	North Brisbane Speedway, Banyo	Jack Holder

== Final classification ==
Pos.	Rider	GIL	DP	LOX	NBS	Total
Gold	Jack Holder	17	12	18	16	63
Silver	Jason Doyle	17	16	17	11	61
Bronze	Max Fricke	11	17	8	17	53
4	Rohan Tungate	14	10	14	13	51
5	Brady Kurtz	8	13	13	11	45
6	Josh Pickering	6	14	11	8	39
7	Justin Sedgmen	13	0	9	7	38
8	Chris Holder	11	10	9	7	37
9	Zach Cook	5	7	8	8	28
10	Zane Keleher	3	5	6	8	22
11	James Pearson	3	6	4	3	16
12	Zaine Kennedy	-	4	5	5	14
13	Ryan Douglas	-	-	-	12	12
14	Sam Masters	8	-	-	-	8
15	Ben Cook	8	-	-	-	8
16	Patrick Hamilton	-	3	2	2	7
17	Jye Etheridge	-	-	5	-	5
18	Cooper Riordan	-	3	1	0	4
19	Fraser Bowes	3	-	-	-	3
20	Brayden McGuinness	2	-	-	-	2
22	Michael West	0	0	0	2	2

== See also ==
- Australian Individual Speedway Championship
- Australia national speedway team
- Sports in Australia
