= 2011 Australian Individual Speedway Championship =

Australian motorcycle speedway championship

The 2011 Australian Individual Speedway Championship was a motorcycle speedway competition organised by Motorcycling Australia (MA) for the Australian Individual Speedway Championship. The event was held over four rounds.

Chris Holder won his third championship.

== Rounds ==
Round	Date	Venue	Winner
1	15 January	Loxford Park Speedway, Kurri Kurri	Chris Holder
2	22 January	Gillman Speedway, Adelaide	Chris Holder
3	26 January	Broken Hill Speedway, Broken Hill	Chris Holder
4	29 January	Olympic Park, Mildura	Darcy Ward

== Final classification ==
Pos.	Rider	Total
Gold	Chris Holder	69
Silver	Darcy Ward	63
Bronze	Davey Watt	63
4	Rory Schlein	63
5	Cameron Woodward	55
6	Cory Gathercole	52
7	Justin Sedgmen	51
8	Kozza Smith	50
9	Ty Proctor	50
10	Sam Masters	40
11	Richard Sweetman	38
12	Kyle Newman	31
13	Jason Doyle	29
14	Taylor Poole	17
15	Arlo Bugeja	14
16	Mitchell Davey	11
17	Brock Gates	3
18	Ryan Sedgmen	2
19	Brenton Barnfield	2

== See also ==
- Australian Individual Speedway Championship
- Australia national speedway team
- Sports in Australia
