= Martin Haarahiltunen =

Swedish speedway rider

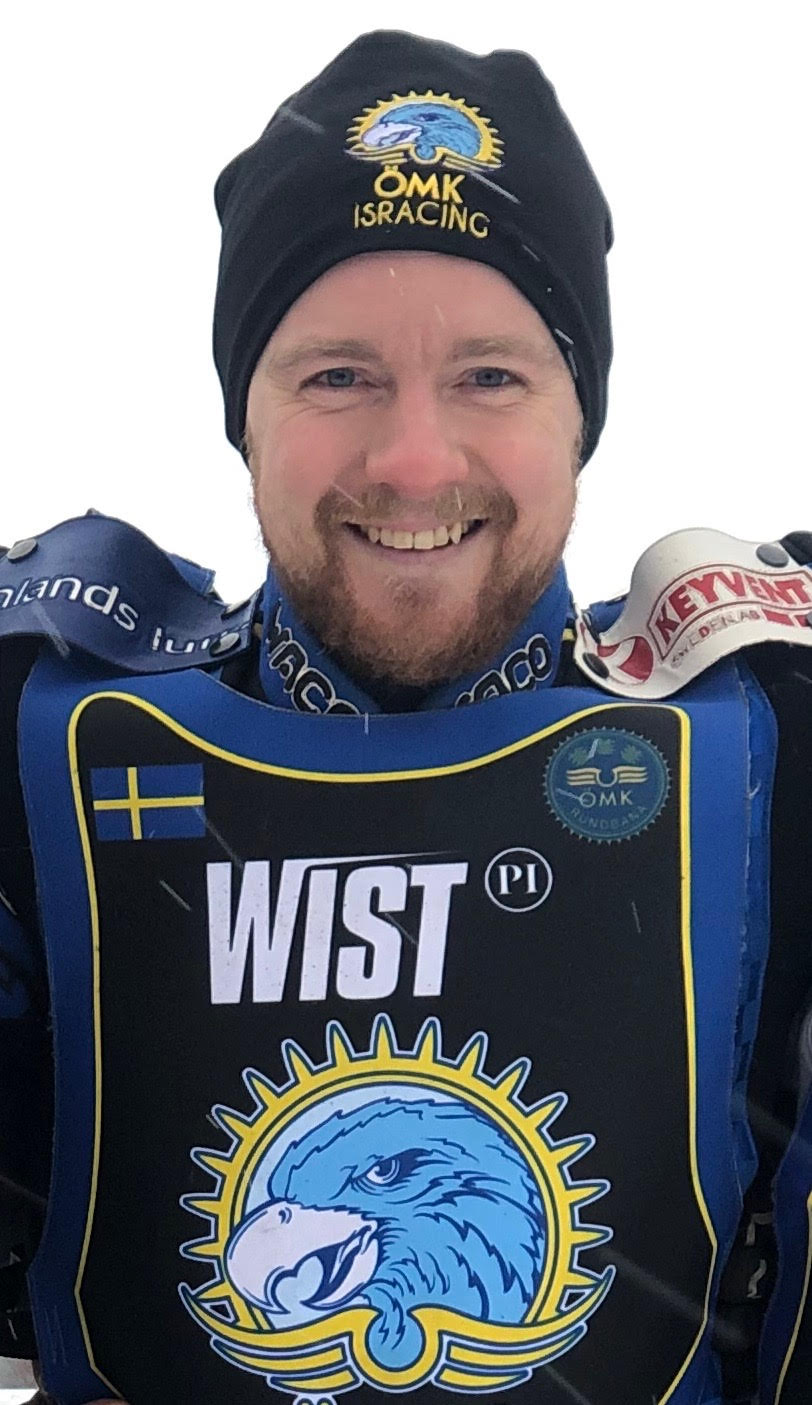
- Born: 2 October 1990; Överhörnäs, Sweden
- Nationality: Swedish

Individual honours
- 2022, 2023, 2024, 2025: Ice Speedway World Champion

Team honours
- 2018, 2019, 2020: 3x World team silver

Martin Haarahiltunen (born 2 October 1990) is a Swedish world champion speedway rider.

== Speedway career ==
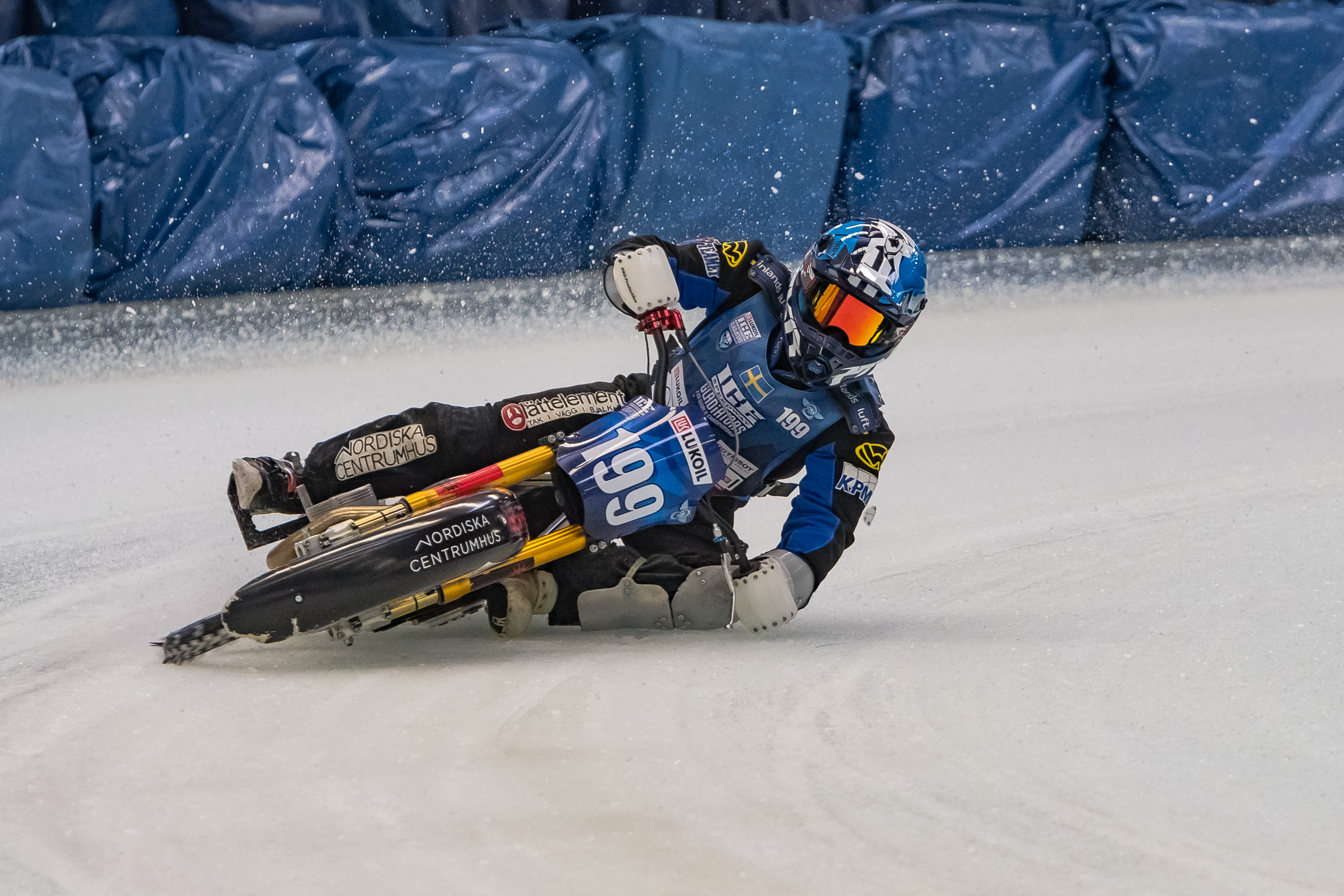
Haarahiltunen in action during 2018

Haarahiltunen became a world champion when winning the Individual Ice Speedway World Championship in the 2022 Individual Ice Racing World Championship. He won the title by virtue of overtaking the championship leader and strong favourite Johann Weber in the final round. Haarahiltunen completed a six race maximum while Weber crashed and was injured.

Haarahiltunen's best placing previously was finishing in fourth place during the 2018 Individual Ice Racing World Championship and is also a three times silver medal winner at the World Team Championships (2018, 2019, 2020).

In 2023, Haarahiltunen retained the World Championship series by winning the 2023 Individual Ice Racing World Championship. The Russian riders were once again banned and the Championship was held over two rounds at Inzell.
