= 2019 Australian Individual Speedway Championship =

Australian motorcycle speedway championship

The 2019 Australian Individual Speedway Championship was a motorcycle speedway competition organised by Motorcycling Australia (MA) for the Australian Individual Speedway Championship. The event was held over five rounds.

Max Fricke won his first championship.

== Rounds ==
Round	Date	Venue	Winner
1	3 January	Gillman Speedway, Adelaide	Max Fricke
2	5 January	Olympic Park, Mildura	Chris Holder
3	7 January	Undera Park Speedway, Undera	Max Fricke
4	9 January	Diamond Park Speedway, Wodonga	Max Fricke
5	12 January	Loxford Park Speedway, Kurri Kurri	Rohan Tungate

== Final classification ==
Pos.	Rider	GIL	OLY	UND	DP	LOX	Total
Gold	Max Fricke	17	13	18	18	17	83
Silver	Rohan Tungate	16	14	11	17	19	77
Bronze	Chris Holder	12	18	15	12	14	70
4	Sam Masters	10	10	9	10	13	53
5	Jack Holder	12	10	10	11	9	52
6	Brady Kurtz	8	12	9	12	10	51
7	Jaimon Lidsey	10	5	13	10	7	45
8	Nick Morris	7	8	11	9	10	45
9	Jordan Stewart	11	6	6	3	8	34
10	Ryan Douglas	6	10	2	8	4	31
11	Todd Kurtz	6	6	5	6	3	26
12	Justin Sedgmen	0	5	9	4	5	23
13	Ben Cook	5	6	1	2	4	19
14	Zane Keleher	5	1	5	4	2	17
15	Kye Thomson	1	5	2	2	1	11
16	Zach Cook	3	1	2	1	4	11
17	Josh Pickering	1	-	-	-	-	1

== See also ==
- Australian Individual Speedway Championship
- Australia national speedway team
- Sports in Australia
