= Överhörnäs =

- Location within Västernorrland Location within Sweden
- Coordinates: 63°18′N 18°33′E
- Country: Sweden
- Province: Ångermanland
- County: Västernorrland County
- Municipality: Örnsköldsvik Municipality

Area
  - Total: 2.39 km^{2} (0.92 sq mi)

Population (31 December 2010)
  - Total: 603
  - Density: 253/km^{2} (660/sq mi)
- Time zone: UTC+1 (CET)
  - Summer (DST): UTC+2 (CEST)

Överhörnäs is a locality situated in Örnsköldsvik Municipality, Västernorrland County, Sweden with 603 inhabitants in 2010.
