= 2024 Czech Republic speedway season =

2024 season of motorcycle speedway in Czech Republic

The 2024 Czech Republic Speedway season is the 2024 season of motorcycle speedway in Czech Republic. The season will run from March to October.

== Individual ==
=== Czech Republic Individual Speedway Championship ===
The 2024 Czech Republic Individual Speedway Championship is the 2024 version of Czech Republic Individual Speedway Championship. Event will consist of two rounds. Final of this event is scheduled to take place on 11 September in Plzeň.

Pos.	Rider	Club	Total
1			
2			
3			
4			
5			
6			
7			
8			
9			
10			
11			
12			
13			
14			
15			
16			
17			
18			

== Team ==
=== Team Championship ===
The 2024 Extraliga is the 2024 edition of the Czech Republic Team Speedway Championship to determine the gold medal winner (champion of Czech Republic). Teams finishing second and third were awarded silver and bronze medals respectively.

=== Extraliga ===
The Extraliga season will run from 16 April to 13 October.

Pos	Team	P	#1	#2	#3	#4	Pts
1	AMK ZP Pardubice	1	1st				4
2	(Slovakia) SC Dynamax Žarnovica	1	2nd				3
3	AK Slaný	1	3rd				2
4	AK Markéta Praha	1	4th				1

==== Calendar ====
#	Date	Place	Winner	2nd place	3rd place	4th place	N
1	April 16	Prague	Pardubice (39 pts)	(Slovakia) Žarnovica (34 pts)	Slaný (26 pts)	Prague (20 pts)	
2	May 22	Pardubice					
3	August 28	Slaný					
4	October 13	(Slovakia) Žarnovica					

==== Leading averages ====
	Rider	Team	Av. event	Av. heat
1	(Latvia) Andžejs Ļebedevs	Pardubice	15.00	3.000
2	(Czech Republic) Václav Milík	Pardubice	13.00	2.600
2	(Poland) Artem Laguta	(Slovakia) Žarnovica	13.00	2.600
4	(Slovakia) Martin Vaculík	(Slovakia) Žarnovica	12.00	2.400
5	(Poland) Oskar Polis	Slaný	11.00	2.200

=== 1. Liga ===
The 1. Liga season will run from 20 June to 29 September.

Pos	Team	P	#1	#2	#3	#4	#5	Pts
1	Profil Team Kopřivnice							
2	AK Marketa Praga B							
3	AMK ZP Pardubice B							
4	AK PD Plzeň							
5	Speedway Divišov							

==== Calendar ====
#	Date	Place	Winner	2nd place	3rd place	4th place	N
1	June 20	Prague					
2	July 17	Plzeň					
3	August 17	Divišov					
4	September 18	Pardubice					
5	September 29	Kopřivnice					

== Squads ==
=== Extraliga ===
AK Markéta Praha

- (Czech Republic) Michal Baštecký
- (Czech Republic) Adam Bednář
- (Czech Republic) Josef Franc
- (Czech Republic) Daniel Halamka
- (Czech Republic) Daniel Klima
- (Czech Republic) Jan Kvěch
- (Czech Republic) Jan Macek
- (Czech Republic) Jaroslav Vaníček

AK Slaný

- (Czech Republic) Bruno Belan
- (Czech Republic) Matěj Frýza
- (Czech Republic) Eduard Krčmář
- (Czech Republic) Patrik Linhart
- (Czech Republic) Martin Švestka
- (Poland) Robert Chmiel
- (Poland) Jakub Jamróg
- (Poland) Mateusz Latała
- (Poland) Oskar Polis

AMK ZP Pardubice

- (Czech Republic) Jan Hlačina
- (Czech Republic) David Hofman
- (Czech Republic) Jan Jeníček
- (Czech Republic) Matouš Kameník
- (Czech Republic) Václav Milík Jr.
- (Czech Republic) Jaroslav Petrák
- (Czech Republic) Hynek Štichauer
- (Latvia) Andžejs Ļebedevs

(Slovakia) SC Dynamax Žarnovica

- (Slovakia) Jaroslav Hajko
- (Slovakia) Filip Kasan
- (Slovakia) Martin Vaculík
- (Slovakia) Jakub Valkovič
- (Poland) Oskar Fajfer
- (Austria) Sebastian Kössler
- (Poland) Artem Laguta
- (Denmark) Anders Thomsen
- (Poland) Szymon Woźniak

=== 1. Liga ===
Profil Team Kopřivnice

- (Czech Republic) Jan Macek
- (Czech Republic) Josef Franc
- (Czech Republic) Radek Bambuch

AK Marketa Praga B

- (Czech Republic) Daniel Klíma
- (Czech Republic) Adam Bednář
- (Czech Republic) Jaroslav Vaníček
- (Czech Republic) Vojtěch Šachl
- (Czech Republic) Michal Baštecký

AMK ZP Pardubice B

- (Czech Republic) Jaroslav Petrák
- (Czech Republic) Matouš Kameník
- (Czech Republic) Jan Jeníček
- (Czech Republic) Jan Hlačina

AK PD Plzeň

- (Czech Republic) Eduard Krčmář
- (Czech Republic) Ondřej Smetana
- (Czech Republic) Hynek Štichauer
- (Czech Republic) Matěj Frýza
- (Czech Republic) Stepan Melc

Speedway Divišov
