= Romanian Individual Speedway Championship =

Motorcycle speedway championship

- Sport: Motorcycle speedway
- Founded: 1962

The Romanian Individual Speedway Championship is a Motorcycle speedway championship held each year to determine the Romanian national champion. It was first staged in 1962.

== Key ==
- Unless stated, all riders are from Romania.

== Past winners ==
Year	Venue	Winner	2nd	3rd
1962	4 rounds	Gheorghe Voiculescu	Alexandru Șinca	Romulus Jurca
1963	4 rounds	Ion Cucu	Gheorghe Voiculescu	Alexandru Șinca
1964	4 rounds	Ion Cucu	Romulus Jurca	Gheorghe Voiculescu
In years 1965–1966 event not held
1967		Ion Cucu	No information	
1968		Ion Cucu	No information	
1969		Ion Cucu	No information	
1970		Ion Bobâlneanu	Ion Ionita	Ion Marinescu
1971		Ion Bobâlneanu	No information	
1972		Ion Bobâlneanu	No information	
1973		Corneliu Voiculescu	Ion Bobâlneanu	No information
1974		Gheorghe Sora	No information	
1975		Gheorghe Sora	No information	
1976		Corneliu Voiculescu	No information	
1977		Gheorghe Sora	No information	
1978		Marin Dobre	No information	
1979		Pavel Ionel	No information	
1980		Pavel Ionel	Marin Dobre	Stelian Postolache
1981		Pavel Ionel	No information	
1982		Pavel Ionel	Stelian Postolache	No information
1983	4 rounds	Pavel Ionel	Marian Gheorghe	Stelian Postolache
1984		Nicolae Puravet	Dan Gaspar	Marin Dobre
1985		Pavel Ionel	Stelian Postolache	Dan Gaspar
1986		Dan Gaspar	Stelian Postolache	Nicolae Puravet
1987		Marius Soaita	Nicolae Puravet	Ilie Sorin Ghibu
1988		Ilie Sorin Ghibu	Marius Soaita	Dan Bogdan
1989		Marius Soaita	No information	
1990		Ilie Sorin Ghibu	Mircea Agrisan	Dan Bogdan
1991		Ilie Sorin Ghibu	Marius Soaita	Marian Gheorghe
1992	4 rounds	Marius Soaita	Stelian Postolache	Ilie Sorin Ghibu
1993	5 rounds	Dan Bogdan	Marius Soaita	Fanel Popa
1994	4 rounds	Mircea Agrisan	Marian Gheorghe	Marian Cojocaru
1995	5 rounds	Mircea Agrisan	Marian Gheorghe	Fanel Popa
1996	10 rounds	Mircea Agrisan	Marian Gheorghe	Fanel Popa
1997		Mircea Agrisan	Marian Gheorghe	Alexandru Toma
1998	4 rounds	Mircea Agrisan	Alexandru Toma	Marian Gheorghe
1999	4 rounds	Marian Gheorghe	Mircea Agrisan	Ilie Sorin Ghibu
2000	6 rounds	Ilie Sorin Ghibu	Marian Gheorghe	Alexandru Toma
2001	6 rounds	Mircea Agrisan	Alexandru Toma	Ilie Sorin Ghibu
2002	6 rounds	Alexandru Toma	Mircea Agrisan	Marius Soaita
2003	6 rounds	Alexandru Toma	Marius Soaita	Fanel Popa
2004	6 rounds	Mircea Agrisan	Alexandru Toma	Fanel Popa
2005	4 rounds	Mircea Agrisan	Alexandru Toma	Marian Cojocaru
2006	2 rounds	Alexandru Toma	Mircea Agrisan	Fanel Popa
2007	4 rounds	Alexandru Toma	Fanel Popa	(Bulgaria) Milen Manev
2008	4 rounds	(Bulgaria) Milen Manev	Fanel Popa	Adrian Gheorghe
2009	4 rounds	Adrian Gheorghe	(Bulgaria) Milen Manev	Alexandru Toma
2010	4 rounds	Alexandru Toma	Adrian Gheorghe	(Bulgaria) Dimitar Minkov
2011	6 rounds	Alexandru Toma	Fanel Popa	Marian Cojocaru
2012	4 rounds (Note: Bulgarian riders in this edition were not classified in championships)	Alexandru Toma	Fanel Popa	Florin Ungureanu
2013	8 rounds	Fanel Popa	Alexandru Toma	Marian Gheorghe
2014	9 rounds	Adrian Gheorghe	Alexandru Toma	Fanel Popa
2015	9 rounds (Note: Bulgarian and Hungarian riders in this edition were not classified in championships)	Adrian Gheorghe	Fanel Popa	Stanel Gheorghe
2016	6 rounds (Note: There was also contested open category. In this classification Andriy Kobrin from Ukraine took 3rd place.)	Adrian Gheorghe	Marian Gheorghe	Stanel Gheorghe
2017	4 rounds	Marian Gheorghe	Alexandru Toma	Gabriel Comanescu
2018	4 rounds	Adrian Gheorghe	Marian Gheorghe	Mircea Agrisan
2019	4 rounds	Adrian Gheorghe	Andrei Popa	Gabriel Comanescu
2020	4 rounds (Note: There was also contested open category. In this classification Milen Manev from Bulgaria was the series winner. Andrei Popa took 2nd place and Marian Gheorghe took 3rd place.)	Andrei Popa	Marian Gheorghe	Daniel Gheorghe
2021	4 rounds (Note: There was also contested open category. In this classification Vitaliy Lysak from Ukraine was the series winner. Milen Manev from Bulgaria took 2nd place and Adrian Gheorghe took 3rd place.)	Adrian Gheorghe	Andrei Popa	Marian Gheorghe
2022	4 rounds	Adrian Gheorghe	Andrei Popa	Marian Gheorghe
2023	3 rounds (Note: There was also contested open category. In this classification Milen Manev from Bulgaria was the series winner. Andrei Popa took 2nd place and Adrian Gheorghe took 3rd place.)	Andrei Popa	Adrian Gheorghe	Daniel Gheorghe
2024	2 rounds			
