= Opende =

Opende De Penne (Gronings)
- Village
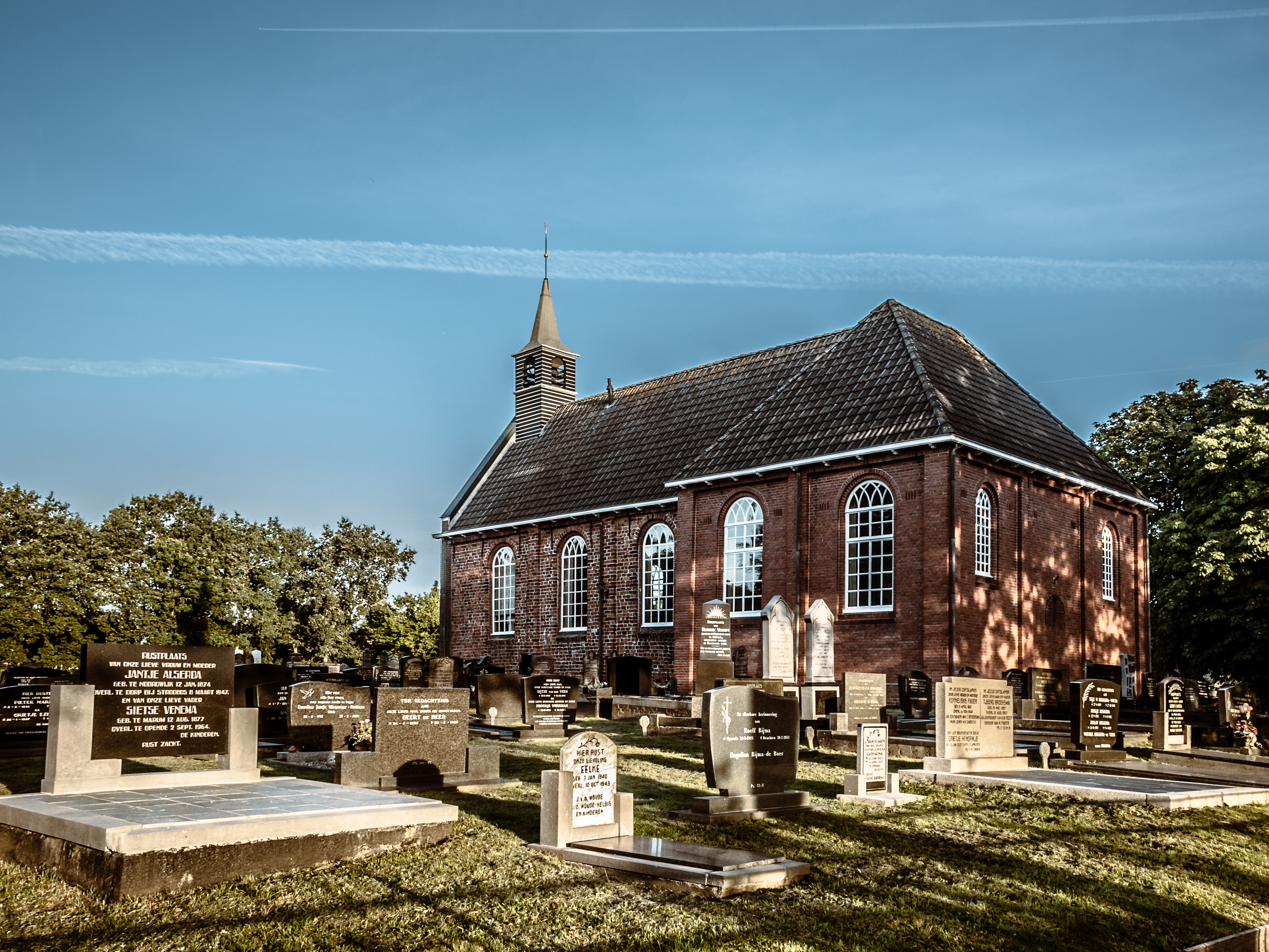
- Protestant church in 2012

- Location of Opende in Groningen in the Netherlands
- Coordinates: 53°10′21″N 6°11′53″E
- Country: Netherlands
- Province: Groningen
- Municipality: Westerkwartier

Area
  - Total: 14.65 km^{2} (5.66 sq mi)
- Elevation: 3.1 m (10 ft)

Population (2021)
  - Total: 2,415
  - Density: 164.8/km^{2} (427.0/sq mi)
- Time zone: UTC+1 (CET)
  - Summer (DST): UTC+2 (CEST)
- Postal code: 9865
- Dialing code: 0594

Opende (Dutch pronunciation: [ɔpˈɛndə]; Gronings: De Penne) is a village in the north-eastern Netherlands, in the province of Groningen. It is part of the municipality of Westerkwartier. It had a population of around 2,635 in 2023.

== History ==
The village was first mentioned in 1457 as Upeynde, and means "upper end", which refers to the border between Groningen and Friesland. Opende is a road village which developed in the Middle Ages in the moorland.

The Reformed church dates from 1748 and replaces a 1648 church. The front was renovated in 1915, and it was enlarged in 1930.

Opende was home to 369 people in 1840.

== Gallery ==
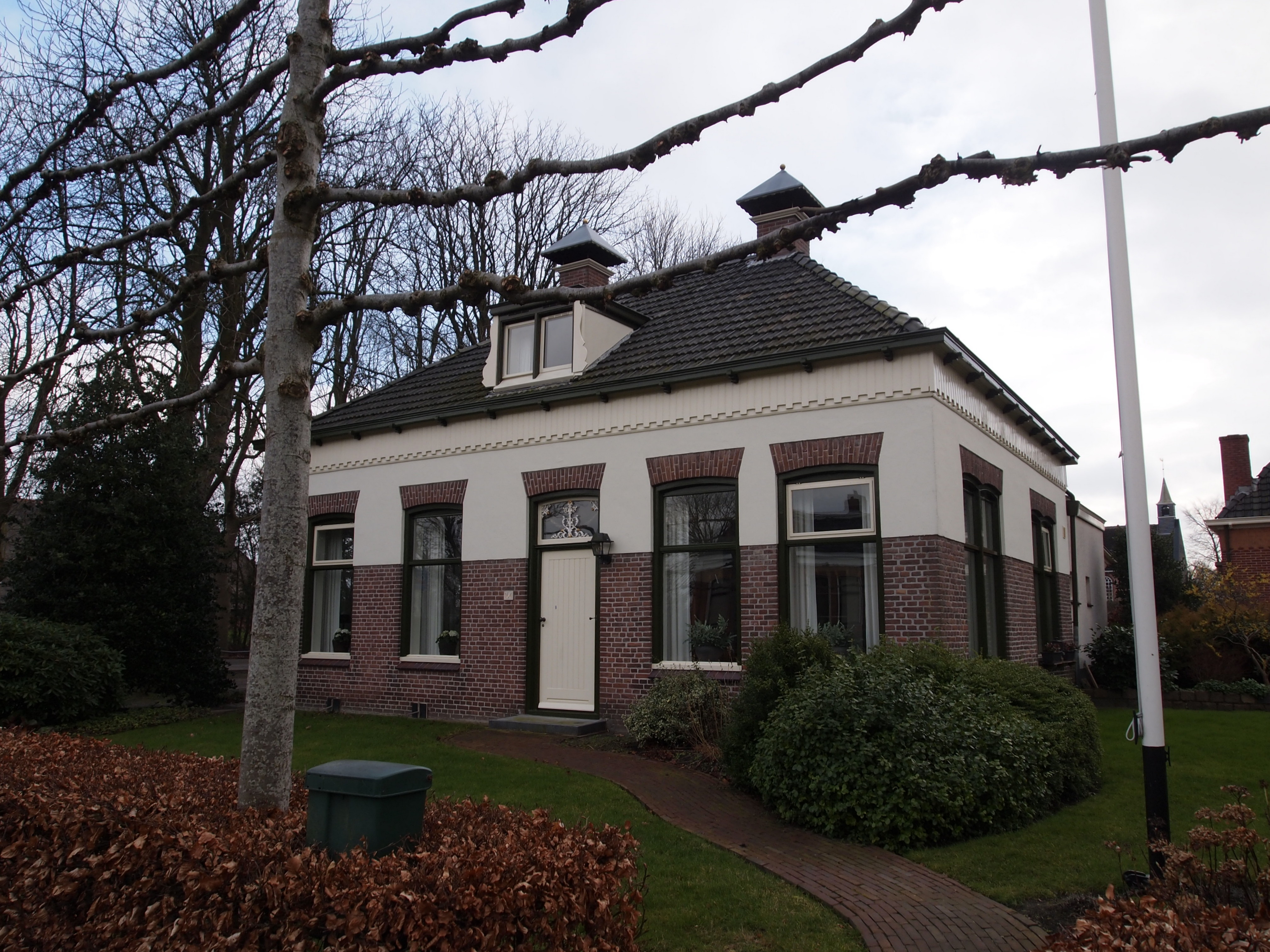
House in Opende

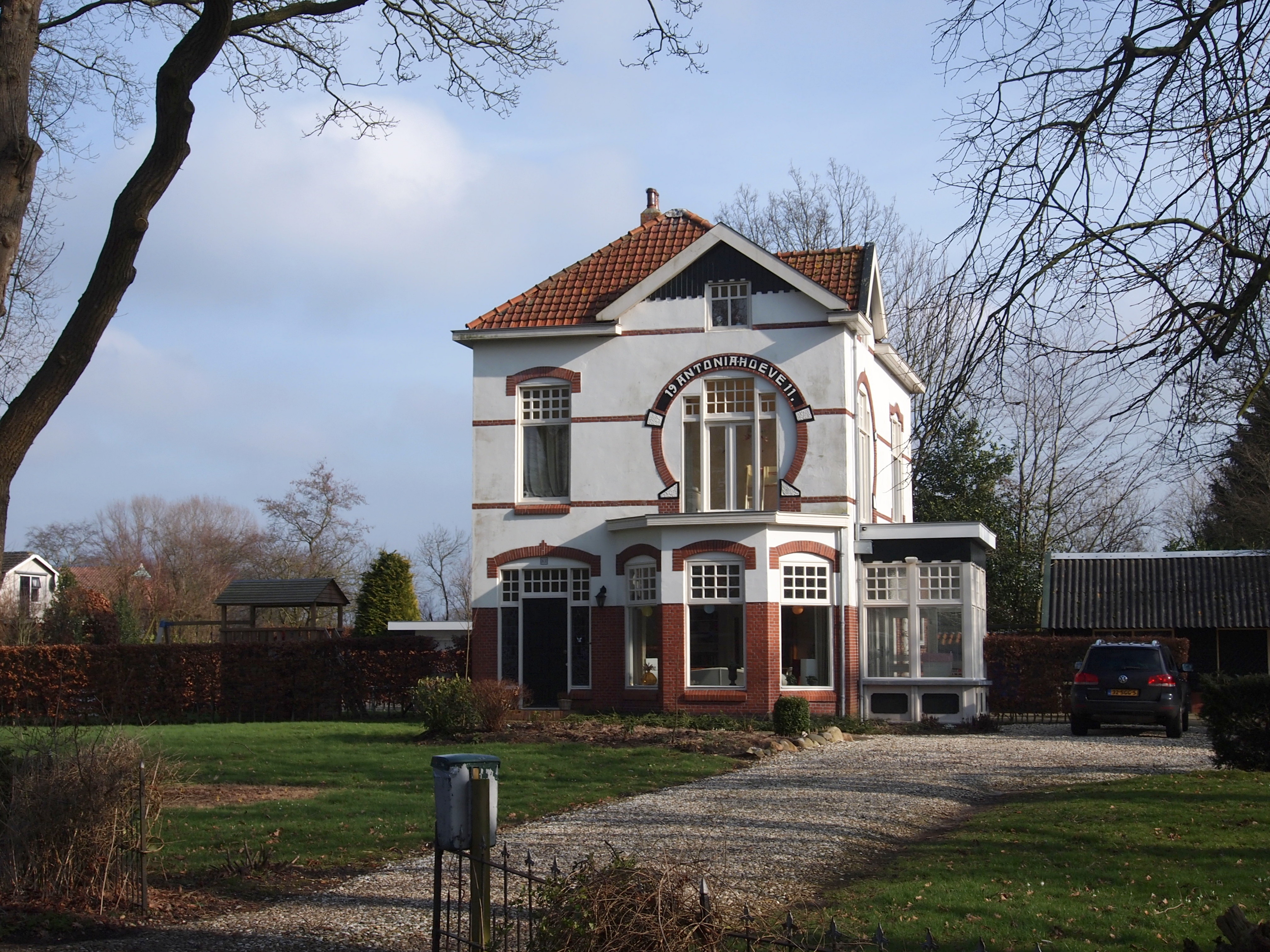
Villa in Opende

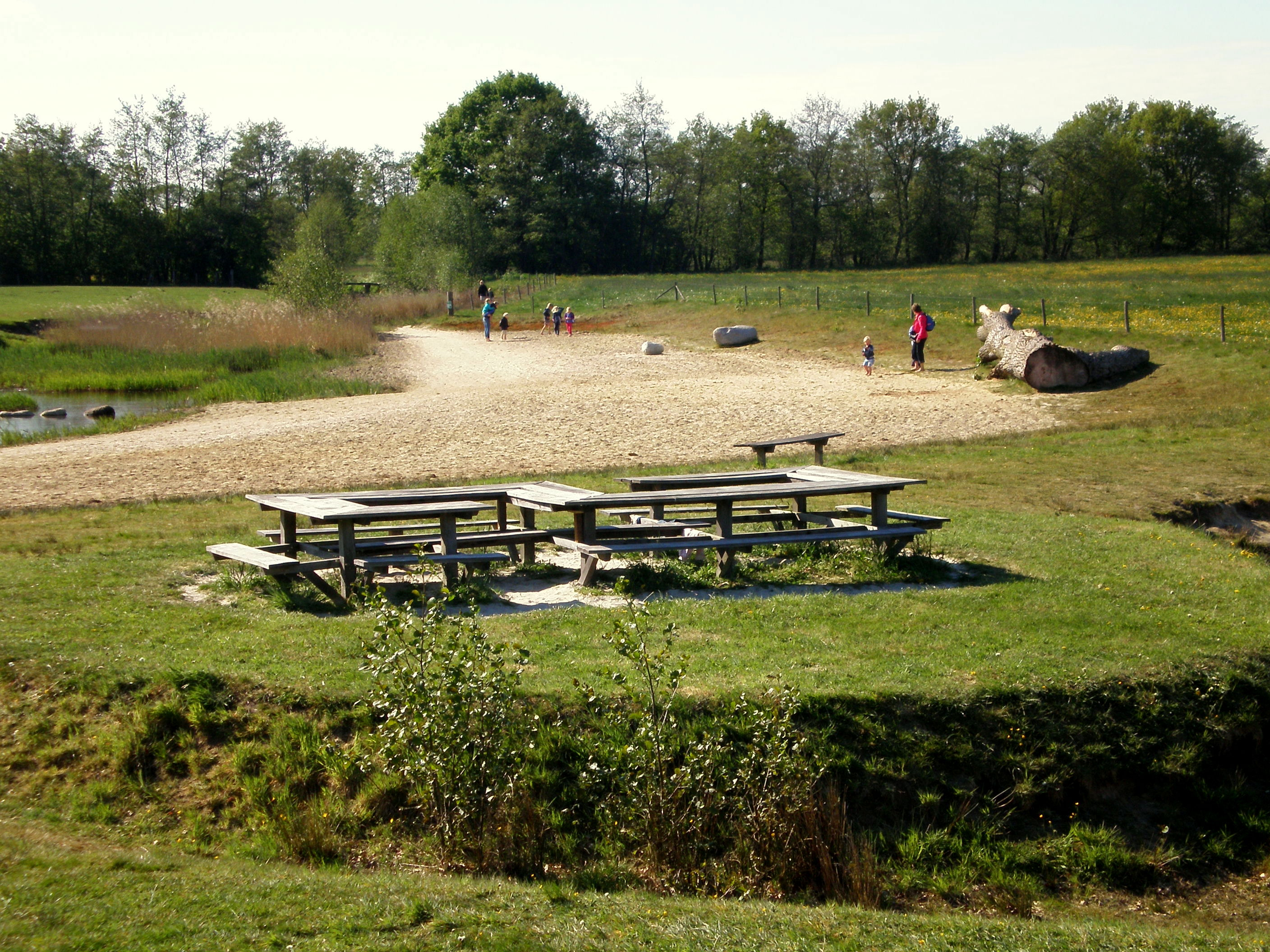
Nature near Opende

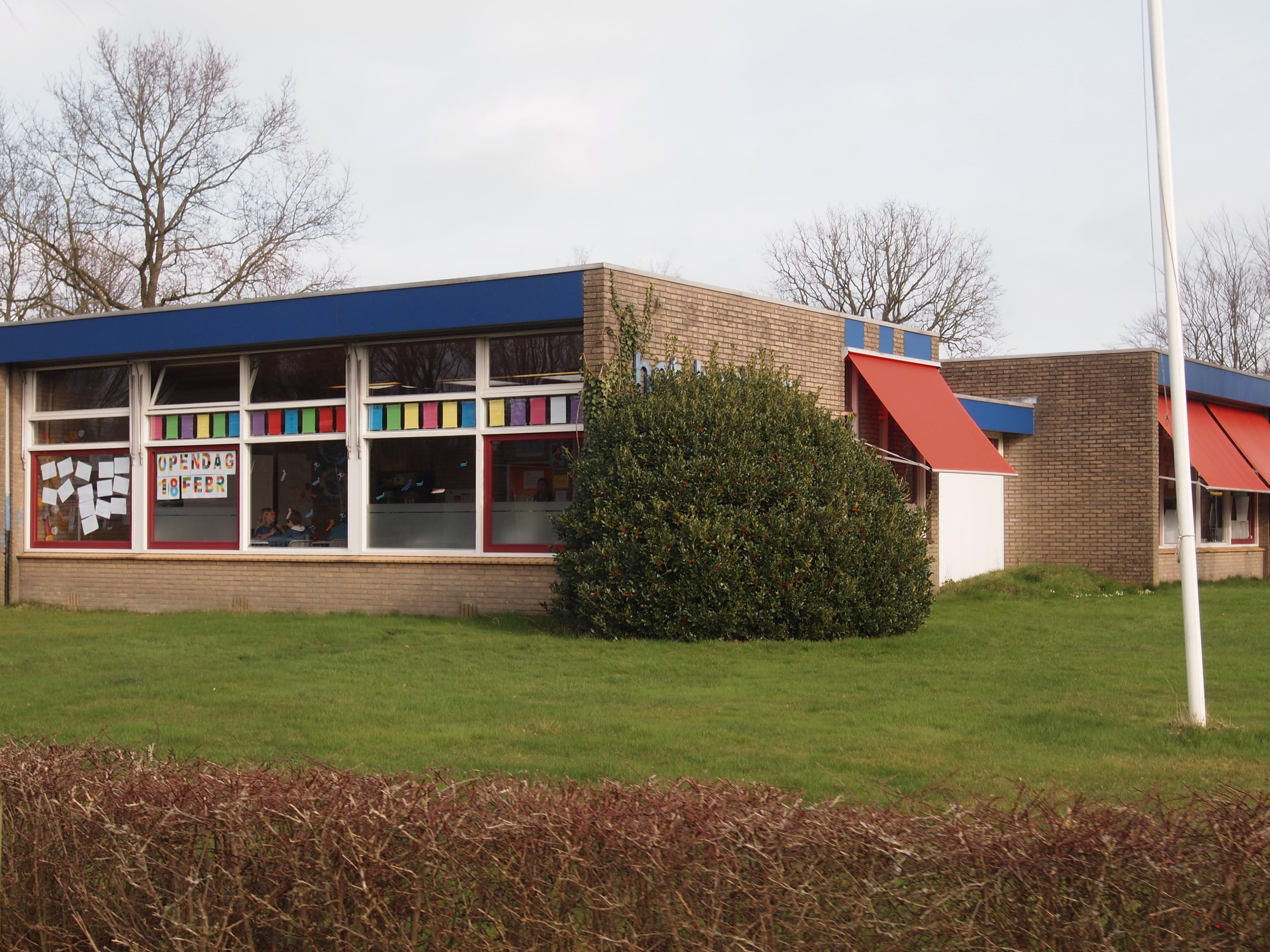
School in Opende
