= Marmande Speedway =

Motorcycle speedway stadium in Marmande, France

- Interactive map of Marmande Speedway
- Location: BP208, 47205 Marmande, France
- Coordinates: 44°30′09″N 0°11′44″E

Marmande Speedway is a grasstrack, longtrack and motorcycle speedway venue in Marmande, France. It is located on the eastern outskirts of the commune, on the intersection of Rue Charle Gounod and Rue Antoine de St Exupery.

== Longtrack and grasstrack ==
The venue has been major venue for events and has held a final round of Individual Speedway Long Track World Championship on multiple occasions.

== Motorcycle speedway ==
The conventional speedway track (inside the grasstrack/longtrack) has hosted many important events, including qualifying rounds of the Speedway World Championship (the first in 1993) and a qualifying round of the Speedway World Team Cup in 1992.

The venue is the home track of the team known as Moto-Club Marmandais and they have raced in the French league and the European Speedway Club Champions' Cup.
