= Tate Zischke =

Australian speedway rider

- Born: 30 July 2005 (age 21); Australia
- Nationality: Australian

Career history

Great Britain
- 2024–2025: Workington
- 2024–2025: Belle Vue

Poland
- 2025: Leszno

Individual honours
- 2022: Australian Solo Championship bronze medal
- 2022: NSW Under-21 champion

Tate Zischke (born 30 July 2005) is an Australian motorcycle speedway rider. He currently rides in the British Speedway Championship, for Workington Comets.

== Speedway career ==
Zischke a protégé of Darcy Ward, came to prominence when he won the New South Wales Under-21 championship 2022 and the bronze medal in the Australian Solo Championship, also in 2022.

In 2023, Zischke rode in the U24 Ekstraliga in Poland for Unia Leszno before signing for Workington Comets in the British leagues for the 2024 season. After being signed by Belle Vue Aces for the Premiership, he suffered serious injuries in a crash fracturing seven vertebrae and five ribs on 1 July.

After recovering from injury, Zischke signed on again for Workington for the SGB Championship 2025 and was named in the Belle Vue team again for the SGB Premiership season.
