= Miramont-de-Guyenne =

- Commune
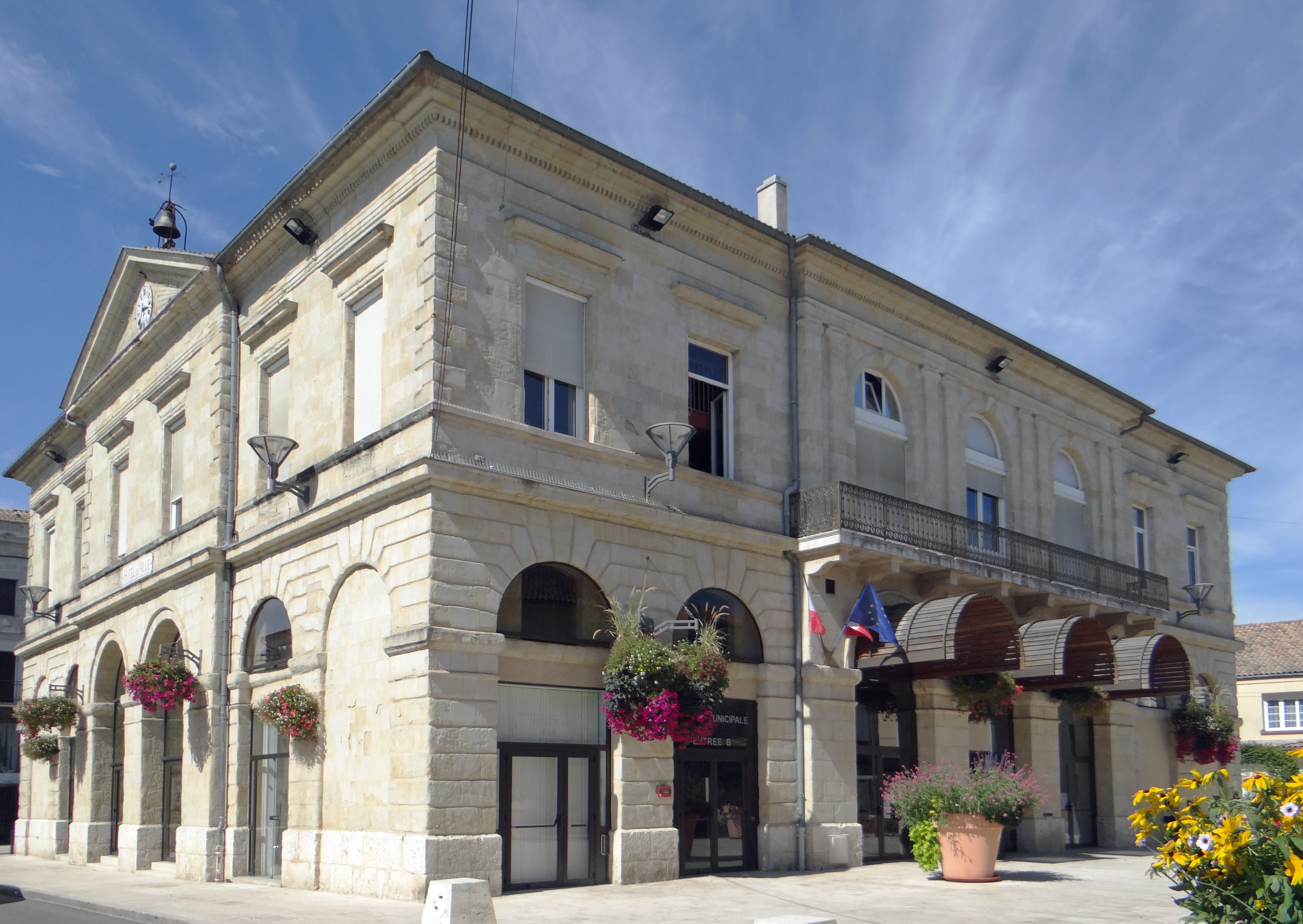
- The town hall in Miramont-de-Guyenne

- Coat of arms
- Location of Miramont-de-Guyenne
- Location within France Location within Nouvelle-Aquitaine
- Coordinates: 44°36′09″N 0°21′43″E
- Country: France
- Region: Nouvelle-Aquitaine
- Department: Lot-et-Garonne
- Arrondissement: Marmande
- Canton: Le Val du Dropt
- Intercommunality: CC du Pays de Lauzun

Government
  - Mayor (2020–2026): Jean-Noël Vacqué
- Area^{1}: 16.66 km^{2} (6.43 sq mi)
- Elevation: 51 m (167 ft)
- Highest elevation: 120 m (390 ft)
- Lowest elevation: 42 m (138 ft)
- Population (2023): 3,081
  - Density: 184.9/km^{2} (479.0/sq mi)
- Time zone: UTC+01:00 (CET)
  - Summer (DST): UTC+02:00 (CEST)
- INSEE/Postal code: 47168 /47800
- ^{1} French Land Register data, which excludes lakes, ponds, glaciers > 1 km^{2} (0.386 sq mi or 247 acres) and river estuaries.

Miramont-de-Guyenne (French pronunciation: [miʁamɔ̃ də ɡɥijɛn], literally Miramont of Guyenne; Occitan: Miramont de Guiana) is a commune in the Lot-et-Garonne department in south-western France.

== Population ==
Historical population
Year	Pop.	±% p.a.
1968	3,744	—
1975	3,964	+0.82%
1982	3,692	−1.01%
1990	3,450	−0.84%
1999	3,360	−0.29%
2007	3,229	−0.50%
2012	3,273	+0.27%
2017	3,154	−0.74%
2023	3,081	−0.39%
Source: INSEE

== See also ==
- Communes of the Lot-et-Garonne department

== Pictures ==
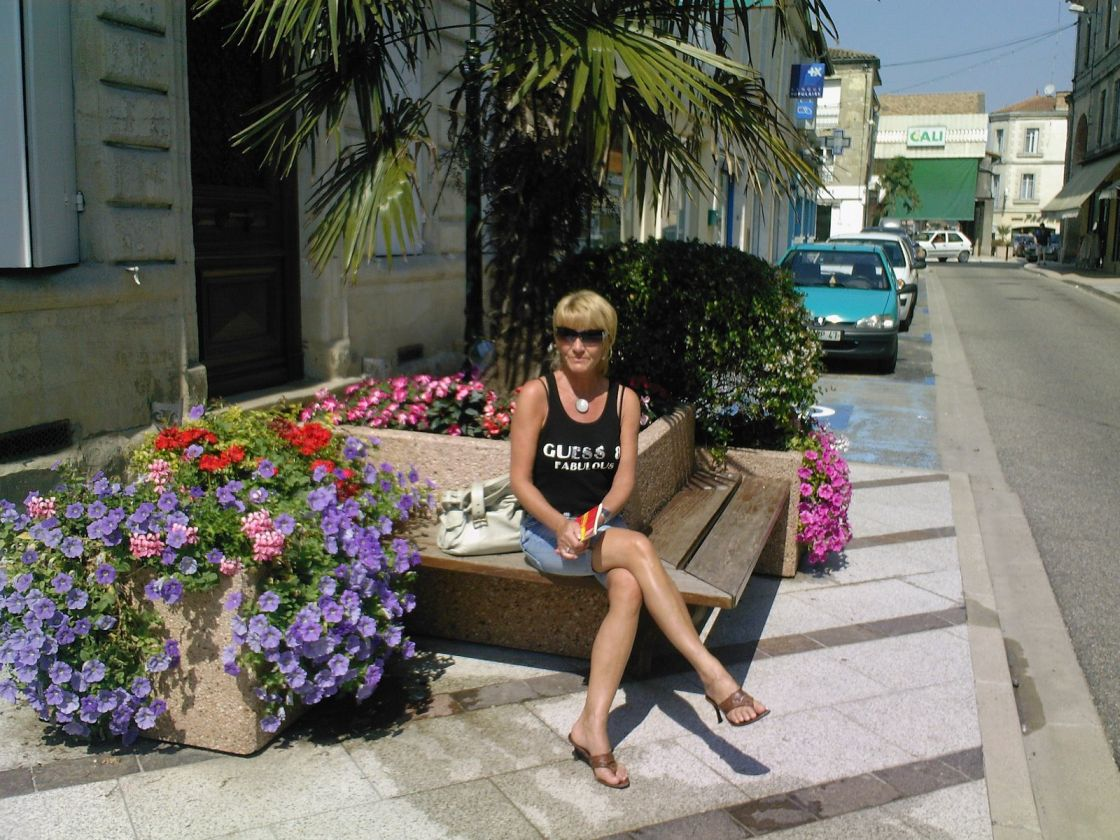
main street
