= Taylor Poole =

Australian speedway rider

- Born: 15 July 1992 (age 34); Sydney, Australia
- Nationality: Australian

Career history

Great Britain
- 2010: Stoke
- 2011–2012: Ipswich
- 2014: Sheffield

Individual honours
- 2012: Australian U21 champion

Team honours
- 2011: Premier League Fours Champion

Taylor Nicholas Poole (born 15 July 1992) is a former motorcycle speedway rider from Australia.

== Career ==
Poole made his British leagues debut during the 2010 Premier League speedway season, where he rode for Stoke Potters.

The following season in 2011, Poole signed for Ipswich Witches for the 2011 Premier League speedway season. He was part of the Ipswich team that won the Premier League Four-Team Championship, held on 23 October 2011, at Beaumont Park Stadium.

Poole stayed with Ipswich for the 2012 season and also won the Australian Under-21 Individual Speedway Championship.

Poole's final season in Britain was in 2014 with the Sheffield Tigers for the 2014 Premier League speedway season.

== Family ==
His father Mick Poole was also a speedway rider.
