= Fraser Bowes =

Australian speedway rider

- Born: 6 November 2001 (age 25); Australia
- Nationality: Australian

Career history

Poland
- 2021: Wittstock
- 2022: Lublin
- 2025: Tarnów

Sweden
- 2022: Indianerna
- 2023–2025: Solkatterna

Great Britain
- 2025: Workington Comets

Individual honours
- 2024: Victorian champion

Team honours
- 2022: Polish league champion

Fraser Bowes (born 6 November 2001) is an Australian motorcycle speedway rider.

== Career ==
In 2022, Bowes was selected to represent the Australian U-21 team and they competed in the final of the U21 World Team Championship, finishing in sixth place. It was also in 2022 Polish speedway season, that he rode for Lublin in the Team Speedway Polish Championship and contributed towards the league title success.

In November 2023, Bowes became the Victorian Speedway champion, after taking the title at Undera Park Speedway.

Bowes signed for his debut season in Great Britain after joining the Workington Comets for the SGB Championship 2025.

== Family ==
Bowes' father Shane was an international speedway rider during the 1980s and 1990s.
