= May 1979 =

Month of 1979

<<	May 1979					>>
Su	Mo	Tu	We	Th	Fr	Sa
		1	2	3	4	5
6	7	8	9	10	11	12
13	14	15	16	17	18	19
20	21	22	23	24	25	26
27	28	29	30	31

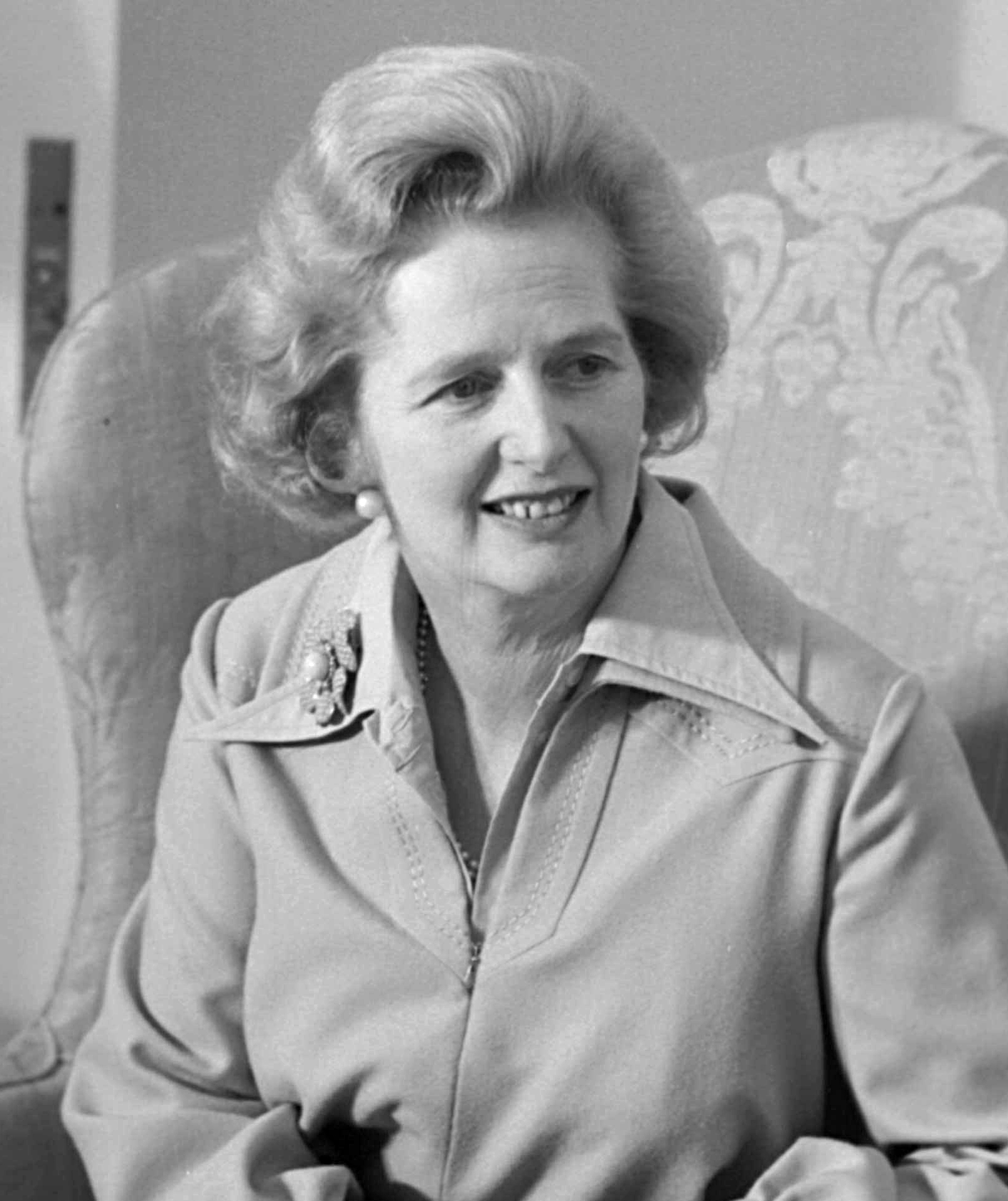
May 4, 1979: Margaret Thatcher becomes first woman Prime Minister of the United Kingdom

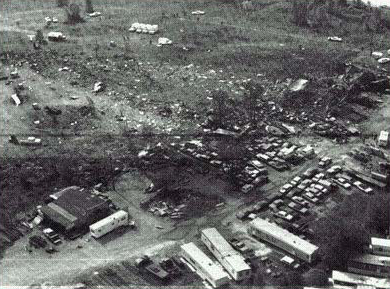
May 25, 1979: 273 people killed aboard American Airlines Flight 191 in Chicago in worst airplane crash in U.S. history

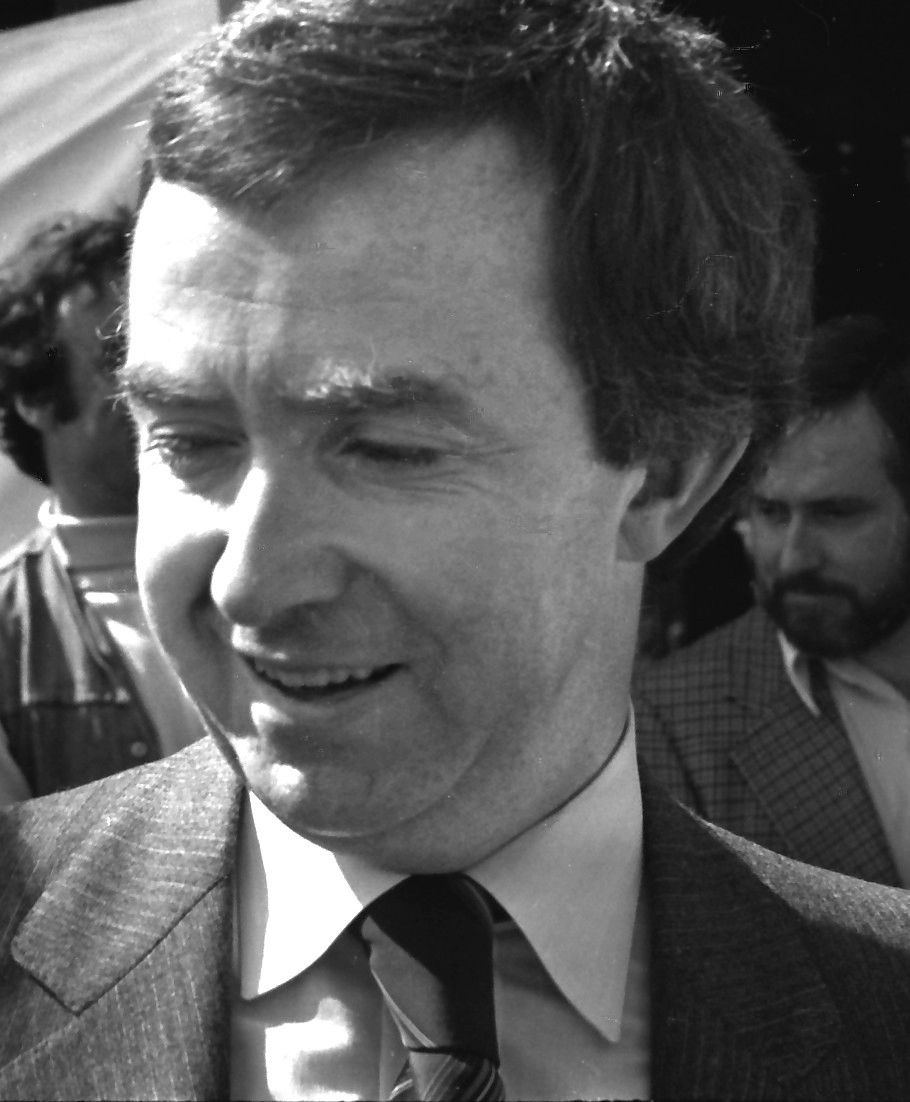
May 22, 1979: Conservative Joe Clark becomes new Canadian prime minister

The following events occurred in May 1979:

== May 1, 1979 (Tuesday) ==
- The Republic of the Marshall Islands was granted self-government within the Trust Territory of the Pacific Islands administered by the United States, with a transition to full independence by 1986.
- Greenland (Kalaallit Nunaat) was granted limited autonomy from Denmark, with its own Parliament and the capital, Godthåb being renamed Nuuk. Jonathan Motzfeldt was inaugurated as the first prime minister of Greenland and served for almost 12 years. The 31-member Inatsisartut was sworn in as the first Greenlandic parliament.
- Malacañang Palace, the presidential residence of the Philippines in Manila, was reopened after two years of remodeling and rebuilding.
- American Communist Angela Davis was awarded the Lenin Peace Prize by the Soviet Union.
- Born: Mauro Bergamasco, Italian rugby union flanker with 106 appearances for the Italian national team; in Padua
- Died:
  - Ayatollah Morteza Motahhari, Iranian Shia Muslim theologian, Chairman of the Council of the Islamic Revolution and a close associate of the Ayatollah Khomeini, was assassinated in Tehran by the Forghan Fighters, an underground group that had killed General Vali Gharani on April 23. Motahari was leaving a dinner party at the home of Iran's Minister of Revolutionary Affairs at 10:20 in the evening, and was shot as he walked to his car.
  - Sérgio Paranhos Fleury, 45, Brazilian law enforcement official and chief of the agency DOPS (Departamento de Ordem Política e Social or the Department for Political and Social Order), drowned before he could be tried.

== May 2, 1979 (Wednesday) ==
- The Houston Angels won the first championship of the Women's Professional Basketball League (WPBL), the first pro basketball circuit for women, winning the fifth game of the best-3-of-5 series against the Iowa Cornets. Houston won the first two games, Iowa the second two, setting up the deciding game, which Houston won, 111 to 104 with Paula Mayo being the high scorer with 36 points.
- Died: Julius Kravitz, 67, American grocery chain executive and chairman of First National Supermarkets, was fatally wounded during a kidnapping attempt the day before in Shaker Heights, Ohio, a suburb of Cleveland. Kravitz was shot three times in the chest and once in the back by two men masquerading as police officers. Police arrested the former president of Multi-Chem Industries and another Multi-Chem employee.

== May 3, 1979 (Thursday) ==
- Voting for the House of Commons took place in the UK and the Conservative Party won a 339-seat majority of the 635 Commons seats, making Margaret Thatcher the nation's first woman prime minister and ending the government of James Callaghan and the Labour Party. Among the candidates becoming MPs for the first time was future prime minister John Major, representing the County Huntingdonshire constituency, formerly occupied by David Renton, who departed Commons to take a seat in the House of Lords.
- The last U.S. Army soldier for the United States Taiwan Defense Command left the island of Taiwan.
- Ted Giannoulas, the originator of the oldest pro baseball team mascot, the "San Diego Chicken", was fired by radio station KGB-FM after five seasons of wearing the costume of what was originally called the "KGB Chicken". When San Diego Padre fans learned that another radio station employee had been substituted for Giannoulas, the replacement was booed off the field. After a successful lawsuit, Giannoulas returned in a different costume with a different mascot name, "The Famous Chicken", on June 29.

== May 4, 1979 (Friday) ==
- Margaret Thatcher, leader of Britain's Conservative Party, took office as the first woman to be Prime Minister of the United Kingdom. Shortly after noon, Prime Minister James Callaghan submitted his resignation to Queen Elizabeth II and, a few minutes later, Thatcher accepted the Queen's request to form a new government, after which Thatcher went directly to her new office at 10 Downing Street.
- The independent low cost British airline Air Europe began commercial service, with a Boeing 737 flight that departed London Gatwick Airport to take vacationers to the Spanish resort of Palma de Mallorca on the Balearic Islands. The airline would exist until going bankrupt in 1991.
- The first Team Ice Racing World Championship (the racing of motorcycles on a frozen surface in a motorcycle speedway) with the Soviet Union finishing first, Czechoslovakia second and West Germany third.
- Born:
  - Lance Bass, American singer (for NSYNC) and record producer; in Laurel, Mississippi
  - Wes Butters, English radio broadcaster; in Salford, Lancashire
  - Réhahn (Rehahn Croquevielle), French photographer and cultural preservationist; in Bayeux
- Died:
  - Leif Erland Andersson, 35, Swedish astronomer who calculated the first observable astronomical transits of the planet Pluto
  - Elisabeth von Dyck, 27, West German militant and suspected member of the Red Army Faction, was shot in the back by police in Nuremberg as she was seen running into a suspected Faction safe house.

== May 5, 1979 (Saturday) ==
- The Islamic Revolutionary Guard Corps, more commonly called the "Revolutionary Guards" in the Western press and "the Sepâh" in Iran, was formed following an April 22 decree of the Ayatollah Khomeini as an intelligence agency and an internal security bureau to investigate and counteract anti-government activity. The Revolutionary Guards would later be designated by the United States and by Saudi Arabia as a terrorist organization.
- The U.S. Secret Service arrested a man at the Civic Center Mall in Los Angeles, 10 minutes before U.S. president Jimmy Carter was scheduled to address a crowd, and found him carrying what appeared to be a pistol. Raymond Lee Harvey was carrying a starter pistol loaded with blank rounds, and told police that he had been hired to fire the blanks into the ground as a distraction in order for Carter to be assassinated by a sniper team that was stationed in the Alan Hotel overlooking the plaza. Los Angeles police found a shotgun case (but not a weapon) and three unspent bullets in the hotel room identified by Harvey.
- In the United Kingdom, "Radio Lollipop" began broadcasting as a low-power radio station with children's programming intended for the benefit of patients at Queen Mary's Hospital for Children in Carshalton, Surrey. The network was then expanded to serve other children's hospitals and hospital wards in the UK and later to Australia, New Zealand, the United States (in Miami and Houston) and South Africa.
- At the Pista di prova di Nardò della Fiat, a test track in Italy for the automaker Fiat at the town of Nardò, a commercially available automobile exceeded 400 kilometres per hour (250 mph) for the first time, covering the 12.5 km (7.8 mi) track in slightly less than two minutes at an average speed of 403.978 kilometres per hour (251.020 mph).
- British commercial diver B. Eke drowned when his diving helmet came off during a surface-orientated dive to conduct routine maintenance on fixed platform 48/29C in the North Sea.

== May 6, 1979 (Sunday) ==
- Parliamentary elections were held in Austria for the 183 seats of the Nationalrat. The Social Democratic Party, led by Chancellor Bruno Kreisky, increased its slim majority from 93 to 95 seats.
- The first large protest against nuclear power since the Three Mile Island disaster, organized by Timothy Massad and Donald K. Ross, took place in Washington, D.C., and attracted between 65,000 and 125,000 demonstrators.
- To call attention to its campaign for the independence of the island of Corsica from France, the Fronte di liberazione naziunale di a Corsica (FLNC) carried out the simultaneous bombing of 20 bank branches in Paris.
- Born:
  - Gerd Kanter, Estonian discus thrower, 2007 world champion and 2008 Olympic gold medalist; in Tallinn, Soviet-occupied Estonia
  - Jon Montgomery, Canadian athlete and 2010 Olympic gold medalist in the skeleton individual sled racing competition; in Russell, Manitoba
  - Benita Willis, Australian long-distance runner and gold medalist in the women's cross country race in the 2004 world championships; in Mackay, Queensland
- Died: Joe Hooper, 40, U.S. Army captain and Medal of Honor recipient for heroism during the Vietnam War in 1968, died of a cerebral hemorrhage

== May 7, 1979 (Monday) ==
- British pilot Gerry Breen set a distance record, which still stands, for a flight on a powered hang glider, flying 202 miles (325 km) from a location in Wales to Norwich, using a Soarmaster, the flight took about 4 hours with a tailwind of about 25 knots (29 mph) and reportedly consumed only 25 litres (5.5 imp gal; 6.6 US gal) of fuel.

== May 8, 1979 (Tuesday) ==
- Ten people, all but one of them shoppers, died in a fire at the Woolworth's department store, a six-storey tall building in downtown Manchester in England. The fire was later traced to an electrical cable on the third floor behind furniture, fueled by highly flammable and toxic polyurethane foam inside the cushions.
- Police in San Salvador, capital of the Central American nation of El Salvador, fired on a crowd of 300 anti-government demonstrators who had taken control of the Metropolitan Cathedral, killing 22 and wounding 38 others.
- The legality of the business model of Amway, a direct sales company that enlists individuals as its distributors of its own manufactured cleaning products, nutritional supplements, and beauty care products, was certified by the U.S. Federal Trade Commission in its ruling in In re Amway Corp., more than four years after the FTC had filed a complaint against the corporation.
- The Islamic Republic of Iran executed 21 former members of the Imperial government, including Majlis speaker Javad Saeed, Information Minister Gholam Reza Khanpour, Education Minister Mohammad Reza Ameli Tehrani, Armored Division Brigadier General Ali Fathi Amin, and 15 officers of the SAVAK, the Shah's secret police.

Died: Talcott Parsons, 76, American sociologist at Harvard University, known for his 1937 book The Structure of Social Action and the social action theory approach to the study of group behavior, died during a trip to Heidelberg University in West Germany, the day after delivering a lecture.

== May 9, 1979 (Wednesday) ==
- California became the first U.S. state since World War II to authorize limits on the purchase of gasoline, implementing an "odd–even rationing" system after a shortage of fuel that had caused long lines of vehicles outside service stations since April 27. The system went into effect at 12:01 a.m. in nine of California's 11 largest counties (out of 58), containing two-thirds of the states 15 million licensed drivers. Affected were the counties of Los Angeles, San Diego, Orange, Ventura, Santa Clara, Alameda, Marin, and Contra Costa, but the county supervisors of San Francisco, and San Mateo turned down the proposal. Under the rules, only private four-wheeled vehicles that had license plates ending in an odd number would be allowed to purchase fuel on odd-numbered days, and those with an even number on even numbered days. All vehicles were allowed to buy on the 31st of the month, and personalized plates without a number were exempted as long as they met the rules of having a tank less than half full.
- King Juan Carlos of Spain opened the first democratically elected parliament in Spain since the Spanish Civil War of 1936.
- U.S. secretary of state Cyrus Vance and U.S. defense secretary Harold Brown announced at a press conference that the United States and the Soviet Union had reached a basic agreement on negotiations during the Strategic Arms Limitation Talks for limitations on long-range intercontinental ballistic missiles and on aircraft carrying nuclear weapons. Two days later, the White House announced that U.S. president Jimmy Carter and Soviet leader Leonid Brezhnev would meet in Vienna on June 15.
- Northwestern University graduate student John Harris sustained minor cuts after opening a package addressed to him by Ted Kaczynski, dubbed "the Unabomber" by the press, and was the Unabomber's second victim overall. Almost a year earlier, on May 25, 1978, Northwestern University police officer Terry Marker had been hurt after opening a suspicious package that had been intended for N.U. professor Buckley Crist.
- Born: Pierre Bouvier, Canadian rock musician (Simple Plan), in Montreal
- Died:
  - Habib Elghanian, 67, Iranian businessman and unofficial leader of Iran's Jewish community during the 1970s, was shot by a firing squad a little more than two months after having been arrested on accusations that he was a spy for Israel. Elghanian's execution, the first under the rule of the Ayatollah Khomeini of someone other than a former government or military official, prompted the departure of most of the 80,000 Jewish residents of Iran.
  - Salvador Balbuena, 29, Spanish professional golfer, died of a heart attack the night before he was scheduled to play in the Open de France tournament.

== May 10, 1979 (Thursday) ==
- For the first time in American history, the price of a gallon of gasoline cost more than one U.S. dollar, with a Gulf station in the Beacon Hill section of Boston, raising its price for premium unleaded gas from 98.9 cents to $1.009.

The FSM Flag

- The Federated States of Micronesia became self-governing after four of the seven constituent members of the United Nations Trust Territory of the Pacific Islands ratified the FSM Constitution. The island groups of Yap, Truk, Pohnpei and Kosrae were initially governed by President Tosiwo Nakayama, who would oversee the transition of the associated state to an independent republic on November 3, 1986.
- The U.S. House of Representatives voted 246 to 159 against giving U.S. president Jimmy Carter the authority to produce a standby plan for the rationing of gasoline. The U.S. Senate had approved the plan, 58 to 39, the day before.
- Born:
  - Lee Hyo-ri, bestselling South Korean pop singer and actress; in Osong-ri, North Chungcheong Province
  - Marieke Vervoort, Belgian Paralympic gold medalist and proponent of the euthanasia; in Diest (d. 2019)
- Died:
  - Cyrus S. Eaton, 95, Canadian-born American financier and railroad executive
  - Charles Frankel, 61, former U.S. Assistant Secretary of State for Educational and Cultural Affairs and president of the National Humanities Center, was shot and killed at his home in Bedford Hills, New York, along with his wife, the apparent victims of a burglary.

== May 11, 1979 (Friday) ==
- Eight children ranging in age from 8 to 13 years old were killed in the Lebanon village of Babiliye, 7 miles (11 km) south of Sidon, after they had become curious about a live artillery shell that had landed in their neighborhood during a clash between Christian militiamen and Palestinian guerrillas.
- Eight oil workers were killed in the sudden collapse of Ranger 1, an oil drilling platform in the Gulf of Mexico, about 12 miles (19 km) offshore from Galveston, Texas. Another 26 were rescued at sea, and the eight dead were believed to have been inside the structure when it fell 60 feet (18 m) into the sea less than four minutes after one of its three supports broke.
- Died:
  - Barbara Hutton, 66, American socialite and philanthropist known as the "Poor Little Rich Girl"
  - Lester Flatt, 64, American bluegrass musician, died of cancer.
  - Bernard Kettlewell, 72, British geneticist known for Kettlewell's experiment of 1953 and 1955 in demonstrating the evolutionary process of natural selection within the fast-reproducing peppered moth, died of an overdose of painkillers.
  - Chris Rosenberg, 28, enforcer and hitman for the Gambino crime family's DeMeo gang, was executed by his boss and friend, Roy DeMeo, to prevent a gang war.

== May 12, 1979 (Saturday) ==
- Down 0 to 2 after 85 minutes in the FA Cup Final, Manchester United tied the game with two goals in the next two minutes as Gordon McQueen scored at the 86th minute and Sammy McIlroy in the 88th. Then, in the 89th minute, Arsenal's Alan Sunderland made the winning goal.
- The Soviet Union began construction of the Novosibirsk Metro, now the third busiest rapid transit system in Russia, and would have it operational within less than seven years.
- Died: Kalpana (stage name for Sharat Lata), 35, popular Indian Kannada language film actress, committed suicide with an overdose of barbiturates.

== May 13, 1979 (Sunday) ==
- A group of 12 Cubans crashed a bus through the fence of the Venezuelan Embassy in Havana and were granted asylum. Venezuela refused to release the group to Cuban authorities, and the 12 Cubans remained on the embassy grounds for more than a year until being allowed to emigrate in 1980 as part of the Mariel boatlift.
- Southern Benedictine College, located in Cullman, Alabama, and having existed since 1953 as Saint Bernard College, ceased operations after the graduation of its final class.
- Born: Prince Carl Philip of Sweden, the oldest son of King Carl XVI Gustaf and Queen Silvia, and younger brother of Crown Princess Victoria. Carl Philip would be heir to the throne for the first seven months of his life, but on January 1, 1980, an amendment to the Swedish Act of Succession changed succession to the throne from agnatic primogeniture (the first male heir, the rule in all other monarchies) to absolute primogeniture (the first heir, regardless of gender), making Victoria the heir apparent.

== May 14, 1979 (Monday) ==
- The Ayatollah Ruhollah Khomeini, head of state of the Islamic Republic of Iran as leader of the Iranian Revolution and of Iran's Shia Islam religious community, hosted a meeting with the Society of Jewish Intellectuals, who had given their support in the overthrow of the Shah of Iran and who opposed Zionism. After his conference with the Society's leaders, Haroun Yashayaei, Aziz Daneshrad and Kamran Boroukhim, along with Jewish clerics Yedidiah Shofet, Avriel Davoudi, and Abdollah Zargarian, the Muslim Ayatollah expressed his support for Iran's Jewish community.
- Died: Jean Rhys (pen name for Ella Rees Williams), 88, English novelist

== May 15, 1979 (Tuesday) ==
- Queen Elizabeth II opened the session of the new Parliament of the United Kingdom and, as a reporter noted, "For the first time in the country's history, both of the protagonists in the traditional ceremony were women," as the Queen read the speech written by Prime Minister Margaret Thatcher for "one of the most ambitious programs presented by a new administration in Britain since the end of World War II."
- Weeks after the fall of Kampala, the army of Tanzania and its Uganda National Liberation Front allies cleared up resistance in the rest of the central African nation in the Battle of Lira.
- Ghanaian Air Force Flight Lieutenant Jerry Rawlings and six other soldiers attempted an unsuccessful coup against Ghana's president, General Fred Akuffo. The coup failed and the group were arrested, with Rawlings sentenced to death in a general court martial and imprisoned. While awaiting execution, Rawlings was sprung from custody on June 4 by a group of soldiers and carried out a second, successful coup d'état.

== May 16, 1979 (Wednesday) ==
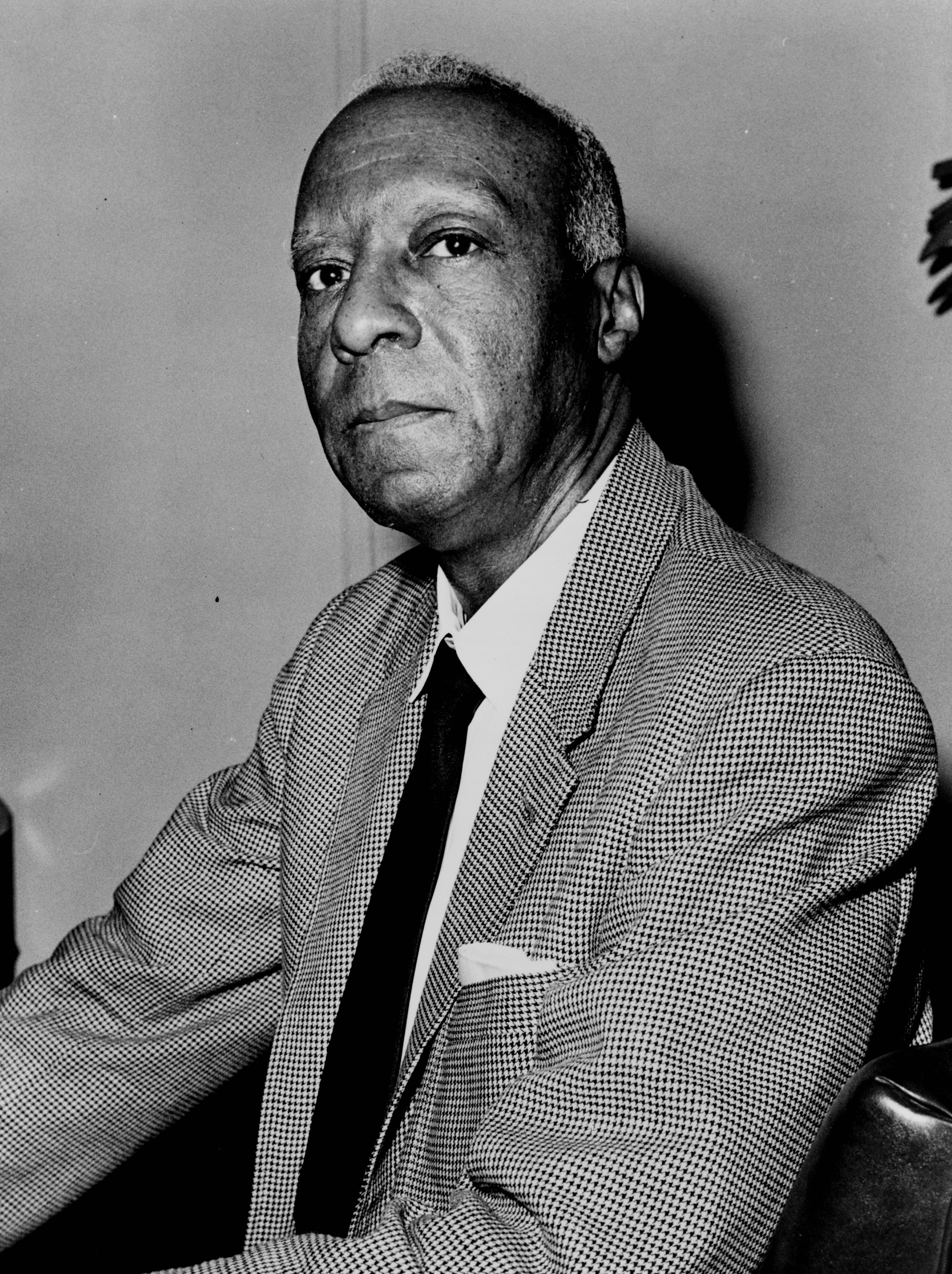
A. Philip Randolph

- The Beijing Television (BTV), the second television network in the People's Republic of China, began broadcasting. As with China Central Television, BTV is owned by the Chinese government.
- FC Barcelona of Spain beat Fortuna Düsseldorf of West Germany in extra time, 4 to 3, to win the European Cup Winners' Cup, played at Basel in Switzerland before a crowd of 50,000.
- In Ankara, capital of Turkey, a group of right-wing militants murdered seven people in a coffee house that was a gathering site of leftists. When the 20 patrons inside obeyed demands to lay down on the floor, the four gunmen began shooting people at random, then fled in a taxi. One of the four killers, Ali Bülent Orkan, would be convicted and executed on August 13, 1982."
- Mountaineers Peter Boardman, Doug Scott and Joe Tasker became the first people to ascend the steep North Ridge of the third-highest mountain in the world, to reach the summit of the 28,169 foot (8,586 m) high Kangchenjunga.
- Died:
  - A. Philip Randolph, 90, African-American civil rights leader who organized the Brotherhood of Sleeping Car Porters labor union in 1925 and the March on Washington in 1963, as well as successfully lobbying U.S. Presidents Franklin D. Roosevelt and Harry S. Truman for executive orders banning racial discrimination in the defense industries (in 1941) and ending racial segregation in the U.S. armed services (in 1948).
  - Kampatimar Shankariya, 27, Indian serial killer responsible for more than 70 murders in a little more than a year in 1977 and 1978, committed by striking the victim with a hammer blow to the neck, was hanged at the prison in Jaipur

== May 17, 1979 (Thursday) ==
- In one of the highest scoring major league baseball games of the 20th century, in which the score was 7 to 6 after the first inning, the Philadelphia Phillies defeated the Chicago Cubs, 23 to 22 at Wrigley Field in Chicago. The highest-ever scoring game, coincidentally, took place at Wrigley Field between the same two teams on August 25, 1922, when the Chicago Cubs beat the Philadelphia Phillies, 26 to 23.

== May 18, 1979 (Friday) ==
- A U.S. District Court jury awarded the family of the late Karen Silkwood $505,000 in compensatory damages and $10,000,000 in punitive damages to be paid by the Kerr-McGee company for her negligent radiation poisoning from plutonium, in a lawsuit suit filed under the federal Occupational Safety and Health Act. The award would be reduced on appeal to only $5,000 damages, but the U.S. Supreme Court would overturn the appellate court ruling; the Silkwood family would eventually settle with Kerr-McGee for $1,380,000.
- In the divided island nation of Cyprus, the Greek Cypriot President, Spyros Kyprianou conferred with Rauf Denktash, leader of the breakaway Turkish Cypriot state in northern Cyprus. The two halves of Cyprus had been separated since a civil war in 1974.
- After 12 Texas State Senators went into hiding to prevent the state senate from having a quorum for a vote on a Republican proposal to allow registered voters of one party to vote in another party's presidential primary, Lieutenant Governor Bill Hobby (in his capacity as state senate president) ordered their arrest so that the absent legislators would be compelled to appear for a session. After a five-day absence, the "Killer Bees" (Hobby's nickname for the group) emerged from hiding and appeared at the senate chamber in Austin and had brought enough attention to the legislation to prevent its passage.

== May 19, 1979 (Saturday) ==
- The price of a gallon of gasoline reached one pound sterling for the first time in British history, as the Price Commission reported that the price at some Esso petrol stations was £1.02, although most other stations had prices ranging from 89p to 92p per gallon.
- The Philadelphia Phillies U.S. baseball team unveiled its "Saturday Night Special" home uniform, all-burgundy version with white trimmings, to be worn for Saturday games. They were worn only once, in a 10–5 loss to the Montreal Expos. The immediate reaction of the media, fans, and players alike was negative, with many describing the despised uniforms as pajama-like. As such, the idea was hastily abandoned.
- Born: Kamran Najafzadeh, Iranian TV journalist and presenter, in Tehran

== May 20, 1979 (Sunday) ==
- The World Hockey Association played its final game. The Winnipeg Jets won Game 6 of the last Avco Cup for the WHA championship, beating the Edmonton Oilers, 7 to 3, at home to win the series, 4 games to 2. Dave Semenko of Edmonton scored the final WHA goal. The Jets and the Oilers, along with the Quebec Nordiques and the New England Whalers would join the National Hockey League at the start of the 1979–80 NHL season.

== May 21, 1979 (Monday) ==
- Former San Francisco city council member Dan White was convicted of manslaughter, rather than murder, for the assassination of San Francisco Mayor George Moscone and Supervisor Harvey Milk, after using what would become known as the "Twinkie defense" and persuading a jury that the crime was not premeditated. The maximum sentence was seven years imprisonment, with eligibility for early parole, prompting the "White Night riots" in the gay community.
- The Montreal Canadiens defeated the New York Rangers four games to one to win their fourth consecutive Stanley Cup, winning game five of the best-4-of-7 series, four goals to one, at home.

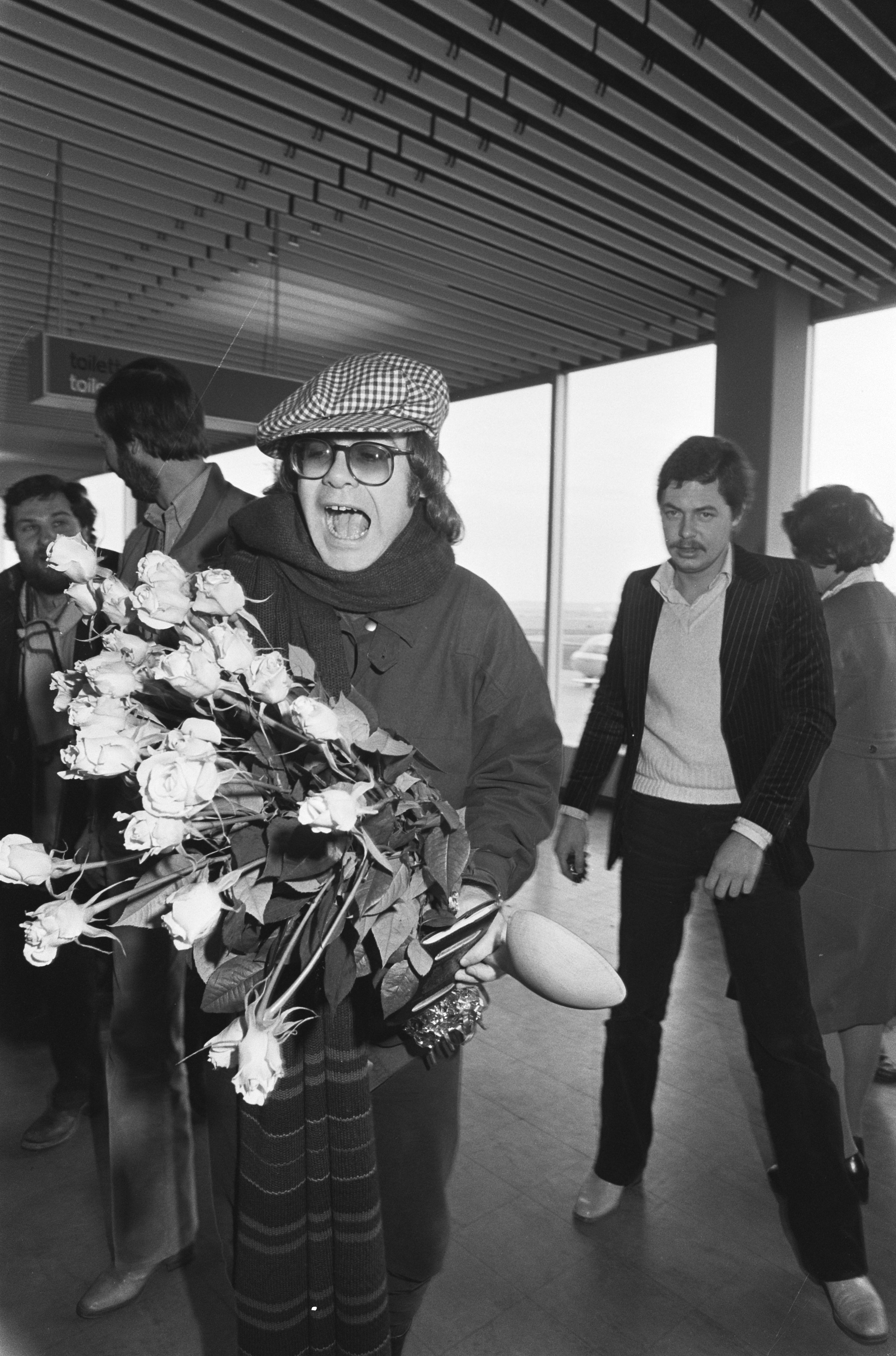
Elton John

- Elton John became the first Western world rock star to perform a concert in the Soviet Union, making the first of four appearances at the Great October Hall in Leningrad. followed by four more at the Rossya Hotel in Moscow. As the guest of the Soviet government, the musician performed his 29-song set in front of audiences of guests invited by the Soviet Communist Party who, for the most part, had never heard of him and listened politely.

== May 22, 1979 (Tuesday) ==
- Elections were held in Canada for the 282 seats of the House of Commons. Prime Minister Pierre Trudeau's Liberal Party, which had a 133 to 98 advantage over Joe Clark's Progressive Conservative Party before the election, lost 19 seats while the PC gained 38, for a 136 to 114 plurality in the House, ending the Trudeau government after 11 years, and making Clark the 16th prime minister of Canada. Clark took office on June 4, but his government would fall only six months later on a vote of no confidence on December 13.
- High school student Randy Rohl and Augustana College student Grady Quinn became the first known gay couple to attend a high school prom when they attended the Lincoln High School senior dance in Sioux Falls, South Dakota. Lincoln High School Principal Fred Stephens had agreed to Rohl's request to bring a male date to the prom, and told reporters afterward, "I'm not promoting it. There are some real confines of the law." A local correspondent noted later, "Except for the reporters' reaction, the young men's presence bothered no one. They looked like other prom-goers, in brightly-colored tuxedos. The only treatment they got was a lot of space on the dance floor." The date is sometimes mistakenly listed as Wednesday, May 23, when the event was in newspapers nationwide.
- The Inter-American Court of Human Rights came into existence in San José, Costa Rica, with the election of seven judges by the 12 nations that had ratified the Pact of San José.
- The first-ever International Cricket Council Trophy competition opened for 30 days of matches, with 15 national teams other than the big six (Australia, England, India, New Zealand, Pakistan and the West Indies) hosted by England in One Day International (ODI) competition for the final two spots in the Cricket World Cup tournament. The ICC Trophy would culminate with a final on June 21 between Sri Lanka and Canada on June 21.
- Born: Abdul-Malik Badreddin al-Houthi, Yemeni politician and leader of the Zaidiyyah Rebellion against the Yemini government since 2004; in Saada, North Yemen

== May 23, 1979 (Wednesday) ==
- South Africa returned to the United Nations General Assembly for the first time in almost five years as its delegation showed up without notice at the beginning of the UN debate over the future of South-West Africa. Although South Africa was not expelled from the U.N. in October 1974, it was suspended from participation because of its discriminatory racial policies.

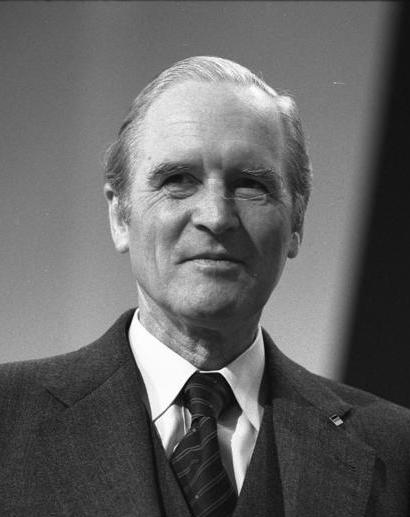
West German president Carstens

- The Bundesversammlung, an electoral college of 1,036 members voted for the President of West Germany. The voting pool for the largely ceremonial head of state job consisted of the 518 members of the Bundestag and 518 delegates selected by the parliaments of the West German states. Karl Carstens, President of the Bundestag, defeated the prior Bundestag president, Annemarie Renger, 528 votes to 431, with 72 members abstaining, four not present and one casting an invalid vote. Carstens, who had joined the Nazi Party in 1937 when he was 22 and remained a member for five years, was not popular among younger West Germans born after World War II, according to results of an opinion poll released on May 21.
- Borussia Mönchengladbach of West Germany won the UEFA Cup after beating Red Star Belgrade (FK Crvena Zvesda) of Yugoslavia, 1 to 0, at Düsseldorf, two weeks after the teams had played to a 1 to 1 draw at Belgrade on the first leg, giving the German team a 2 to 1 aggregate win.
- Died: Carlos Herrera Rebollo, El Salvador's Minister of Education and former mayor of San Salvador, was assassinated by gunmen while driving to his office, the morning after Salvadoran police killed 14 anti-government demonstrators outside of the Venezuelan Embassy. The Fuerzas Populares de Liberación Farabundo Martí guerrilla group claimed responsibility, announcing to news agencies that "We have executed Education Minister Herrera Rebollo."

== May 24, 1979 (Thursday) ==
- In response to continuing student protests in the Asian kingdom of Nepal, King Birendra Bir Bikram Shah announced that a referendum would be held to determine whether a new form of government should be adopted to allow multiparty elections, or whether to retain the panchyat system in which village councils elected the provincial legislatures that, in turn, elected the legislative body above them.
- The last 48 of the 913 bodies of Americans, killed in the Jonestown Massacre in Guyana on November 18, 1978, were buried. The 48 victims, all unidentified and mostly children who had been brought to the South American camp by People's Temple cult leader Jim Jones, were interred at a common grave at Evergreen Cemetery in Oakland, California.
- Thorpe Park, England's first theme park and one of the 10 largest in Europe, opened in England at Chertsey, Surrey, 20 miles (32 km) southwest of Central London.
- Andrew McGuire launched the Campaign for Fire Safe Cigarettes in order to lobby tobacco manufacturers to make self-extinguishing cigarettes the standard.

== May 25, 1979 (Friday) ==
- The crash of American Airlines Flight 191 killed all 271 people on board and two on the ground in the deadliest aviation accident in U.S. history. The DC-10 went down immediately after taking off at 3:04 in the afternoon local time (2104 UTC) for Los Angeles from Chicago's O'Hare International Airport when the left engine fell off, causing the jet to roll right and to crash into a trailer park adjacent to the airport. Investigation determined that a 3 in (76 mm) long bolt on the engine mounting, weakened by metal fatigue, had broken under the strain of vibrations from the engine, which fell off on the runway just as the DC-10 was making its ascent.
- The electric chair was used in the United States for the first time since 1966 (at the execution of James French in Oklahoma), in only the second execution to take place since the re-introduction of the death penalty in Florida in 1976. Convicted murderer John Spenkelink, who had shot and killed a convicted robber in 1973 after an argument, was put to death at 10:12 in the morning at the Florida State Penitentiary in Starke, Florida.
- The town of El Arish, located on the Sinai Peninsula and captured from Egypt by Israel in 1967 during the Six-Day War, was returned to Egyptian control after almost 12 years, along with a strip of land along the Mediterranean Sea as Israel began its withdrawal of troops from the occupied Sinai peninsula of Egypt. The withdrawal of all troops from Egyptian territory, done pursuant to Israel's treaty with Egypt, and would be completed on April 26, 1982.
- Etan Patz, a 6-year-old boy, vanished while walking to school. The Patz disappearance would become a cold case until being re-opened in 2010. On May 24, 2012, almost 33 years to the day after the child's disappearance, Pedro Hernandez was arrested after confessing to the kidnapping and murdering Etan Patz.
- The science fiction horror film Alien had its premiere, opening at the Seattle International Film Festival before going into general release in the U.S. on June 22. Despite being in only 91 cinemas in its first week, Alien grossed $4.75 million in ticket sales in seven days. It became a box-office success and an Academy Award winner, and would create a franchise with seven sequels and crossovers.
- Died:
  - Itzhak Bentov, 55, American biomedical engineer and inventor, on Flight 191
  - Leonard Stogel, 54, American rock festival producer, on Flight 191

== May 26, 1979 (Saturday) ==
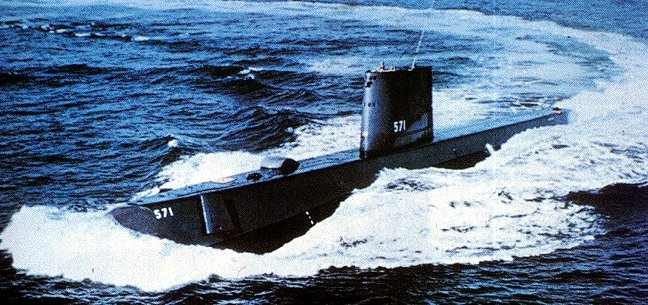
USS Natilus

- USS Nautilus, the first ever nuclear-powered submarine, ended its service after more than 25 years, arriving at the Mare Island Naval Shipyard at Vallejo, California, for decommissioning.
- Pope John Paul II elevated 14 Roman Catholic archbishops to the College of Cardinals, raising the total to 135. The Pope also said that he had chosen to elevate a 15th person, whom he declined to name other than to say that the choice was in pectore (in my heart), to the cardinalate.
- Nearly three months after the end of the war between the People's Republic of China and Vietnam, the two nations agreed to release the prisoners of war captured by both sides, with Vietnam freeing 240 Chinese and China releasing 1,518 Vietnamese P.O.W.'s. The release would take place in four stages starting on May 28 and ending on June 22.
- Died: George Brent (stage name for George Nolan), 75, Irish-born American film actor, known primarily as the co-star with actress Bette Davis in 11 films, including Dark Victory and Jezebel.

== May 27, 1979 (Sunday) ==
- Mauritania's prime minister Ahmed Ould Bouceif, who had taken office seven weeks earlier on April 6, was killed along with 11 other people in a plane crash off of the coast of Senegal. According to the Senegalese press agency, Bouceif's plane had taken off from Nouakchott for a 30-minute flight to Dakar and was circling the airport because of low visibility caused by a sandstorm. Bouceif was on his way to a meeting of the Economic Community of West African States.
- Rick Mears won the Indianapolis 500 auto race, one in which 35 cars rather than the usual 33 were allowed to compete because some racers had initially been disqualified during time trials. On the same day, Darrell Waltrip won the NASCAR World 600 at Charlotte, North Carolina. Jody Scheckter won the Monaco Grand Prix one car-length ahead of Clay Regazzoni, who had battled from 15th place to second and almost won the race; at race's end, only seven of the 20 starters were still competing and were racing "around a track littered with disabled cars".

== May 28, 1979 (Monday) ==
- Josiah Zion Gumede was elected as the first black President of the formerly white minority-ruled government of Rhodesia, recently renamed Zimbabwe Rhodesia. Gumede was favored over challenger Timothy Ndhlovu, 80 to 33, for the largely ceremonial post as the official head of state, with the primary exercise of power to be retained by Prime Minister Abel Muzorewa.
- William Bonin committed the first of the "Freeway Killer" murders, killing a 13-year-old boy, Thomas Lundgren of Reseda, California. Bonin and his accomplice, Vernon Butts picked up Thomas, who was hitchhiking, and stabbed him to death, then dumped the partially-dismembered body at Agoura.

== May 29, 1979 (Tuesday) ==
- U.S. District Court Judge John H. Wood Jr., known as "Maximum John" for his harsh sentencing of drug traffickers, was assassinated while standing by his car in San Antonio, Texas. Wood, shot by a sniper with a high-powered rifle, became the first American federal judge in U.S. history to be murdered. At 8:30 in the morning, Judge Wood was walking from the doorway of his condominium at the Chateaux Dijon and preparing to open his car door when he was struck in the low back by a single gunshot. His assassin, Charles Harrelson, carried out the killing after being paid by drug dealer Jamiel Chagra, who was free on $400,000 bond. Harrelson would be sentenced to life imprisonment, and Chagra to 10 years incarceration.

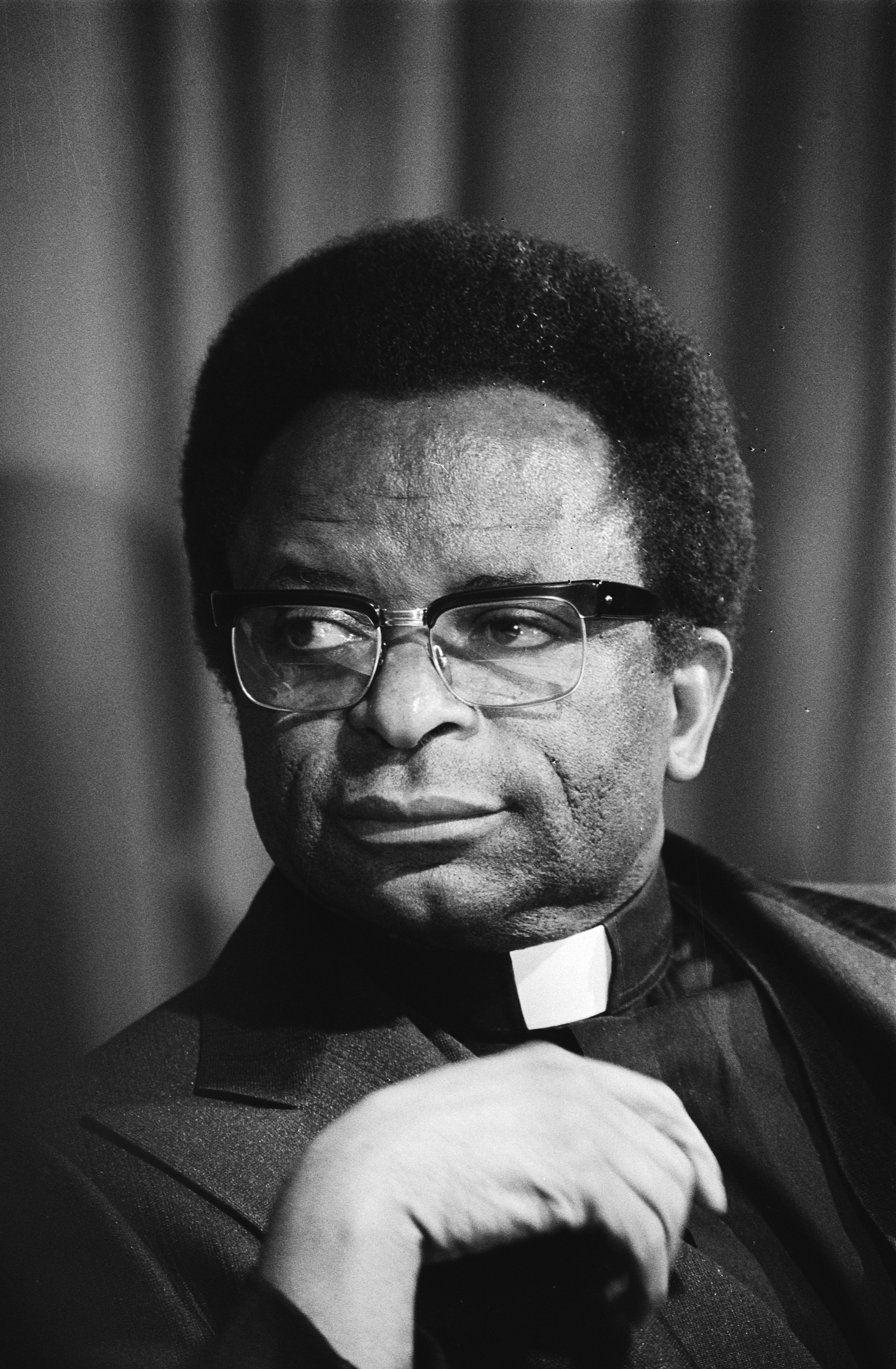
Prime Minister Muzorewa

- Abel Muzorewa was sworn in as the first black premier of Zimbabwe (at the time, called Zimbabwe Rhodesia) as part of the transition from a white-minority government to the black majority.
- Three Israeli Navy ships— Ashdod, Achziv and Ashkelon — became the first military vessels from Israel to traverse the Suez Canal during peacetime as they reached the end of a 14-hour voyage from the Red Sea to the Mediterranean Sea. The vessels were among 29 that made the voyage, which came 29 days after the April 30 passage through the Canal by an Israeli freighter, also called the Ashdod.
- Born:
  - Scribe (stage name for Malo Ioane Luafutu), New Zealand rapper
  - Fonseca (stage name for Juan Fernando Fonseca), Colombian singer and songwriter; in Bogotá
- Died: Mary Pickford (stage name for Gladys Marie Smith), 87, Canadian-born U.S. film actress known as "America's Sweetheart" during the silent film era.

== May 30, 1979 (Wednesday) ==
- A team of neurosurgeons at the University of Utah Medical Center separated 19-month-old conjoined twins, Lisa Hansen and Elisa Hansen who were joined at top of their heads, in a delicate operation that took 16 1/2 hours. The most critical part of the operation was the separation of blood vessels and tissue that connected to the brains of the two girls. The two children were able to leave the hospital seven weeks later.
- A land mine killed 27 soldiers of the Royal Thai Army when their truck detonated the explosive, planted by anti-government rebels near the city of Udon Thani in northeast Thailand.
- Downeast Airlines Flight 46 crashed as it approached its scheduled landing in Rockland, Maine, after a 65-minute flight from Boston, killing 17 of the 18 people aboard. The Twin Otter plane was descending in a thick fog and the co-pilot went below the minimum descent altitude in order to see the runway, and struck a hillside more than a mile short of the airport at Owls Head, Maine. The plane crash remains the worst ever in the U.S. state of Maine,
- Nottingham Forest, the second-place finisher of The Football League of England, won the European Cup, 1 to 0, over the defending Swedish Cup champion, Malmö FF.
- Abel Muzorewa, the new Rhodesian prime minister, appointed a cabinet that included 12 black Africans and five whites, including outgoing prime minister Ian Smith. Smith given the third-highest ranking position as Minister Without Portfolio, and whites were appointed as the ministers of Agriculture, Finance, Justice and Transport.
- The daily Tehran newspaper Jomhouri-e Eslami (The Islamic Republican), published its first issue.

== May 31, 1979 (Thursday) ==
- Mohamed Khouna Ould Haidalla became the third Prime Minister of Mauritania, four days after the death of Ahmed Ould Bouceif.
- The Big East Conference, founded as a college athletic conference of independent basketball programs in Providence, St. John's, Georgetown, and Syracuse invited Seton Hall, U. Connecticut, Holy Cross, Rutgers, and Boston College.
- RTÉ 2fm, the second radio network of the Irish broadcaster Raidió Teilifís Éireann, began operations.
- Dmitry Shparo of the Soviet Union became the first person to reach the North Pole by cross-country skiing.
- The Muppet Movie premiered, initially in the United Kingdom, as the first theatrical adaptation of the popular syndicated TV program, The Muppet Show, and would debut in the United States on June 22.
