= Kolpashevsky =

Kolpashevsky (masculine), Kolpashevskaya (feminine), or Kolpashevskoye (neuter) may refer to:

- Kolpashevsky District, a district of Tomsk Oblast, Russia
- Kolpashevskoye Urban Settlement, a municipal formation which the town of Kolpashevo and three rural localities in Kolpashevsky District of Tomsk Oblast, Russia are incorporated as
