= 1979 Individual Ice Speedway World Championship =

Motorcycle ice speedway race

Seasons
- ← 1978 1980 →

The 1979 Individual Ice Speedway World Championship was the 14th edition of the World Championship The Championship was held on 4/5 March 1979 in Inzell, Germany.

The winner was Anatoly Bondarenko of the Soviet Union.

== Classification ==
Pos	Rider	Pts
1	(Soviet Union) Anatoly Bondarenko	30(15+15)
2	(Soviet Union) Vladimir Liobich	26(13+13)
3	(Czechoslovakia) Zdeněk Kudrna	26(13+13)
4	(Soviet Union) Sergey Tarabanko	23 (11+12)
5	(Soviet Union) Anatoly Gladyshev	21
6	(Soviet Union) Alexander Shcherbakov	20(11+9)
7	(Soviet Union) Vladmir Subbotin	15(8+7)
8	(Sweden) Per-Olof Serenius	15(6+9)
9	(West Germany) Leonard Oswald	15(8+7)
10	(Sweden) Hans Johansson	15(4+11)
11	(Austria) Walter Wartbichler	12
12	(Czechoslovakia) Jiri Jirout	9(5+4)
13	(Sweden) Conny Samuelsson	5(4+1)
14	(Austria) Kurt Wartbichler	4(1+3)
15	(West Germany) Max Miedermaier	3(0+3)
16	(Czechoslovakia) Jiri Svoboda (res)	2(2+0)
17	(Austria) Hans Hohenwarter (res)	0(0+0)

== See also ==
- 1979 Team Ice Racing World Championship
- 1979 Individual Speedway World Championship in classic speedway
