= 1979 Team Ice Racing World Championship =

Seasons
- ← none 1980 →

The 1979 Team Ice Racing World Championship was the inaugural edition of the Team World Championship. The final was held on 4 May 1979 in Kalinin (Tver) in the Soviet Union.

The title was won by the Soviet Union.

== Classification ==
Pos	Riders	Pts
1	(Soviet Union) Sergey Tarabanko 20, Anatoly Gladyshev 20, Anatoly Bondarenko 19	59
2	(Czechoslovakia) Zdeněk Kudrna 28, Jiří Jirout 14, Stanislav Dyk DNR	42
3	(West Germany) Leonard Oswald 32, Helmut Weber 7, Albert Stickl DNR	39
4	(Sweden) Conny Samuelsson 19, Hans Johansson 14, Kurt Westlund 5	34
5	(Austria) Walter Wartbichler 26, Kurt Wartbichler 8, Hans Hohenwarter DNR	34
6	(Finland) Tom Hiltunen 21, Timo Sinkkonen 6, Hakan Storm 1	28
7	(Netherlands) Piet Seur 7, Hank Jager 4, Hilbert Tel 1	12

== See also ==
- 1979 Individual Ice Speedway World Championship
- 1979 Speedway World Team Cup in classic speedway
- 1979 Individual Speedway World Championship in classic speedway
