= 1981 Individual Ice Speedway World Championship =

Motorcycle ice speedway race

Seasons
- ← 1980 1982 →

The 1981 Individual Ice Speedway World Championship was the 16th edition of the World Championship The Championship was held on 7/8 March 1981 in Assen in the Netherlands.

The winner was Vladimir Lyubich of the Soviet Union.

== Classification ==
Pos	Rider	Pts
1	(Soviet Union) Vladimir Ljubitsch	28(15+13)
2	(Soviet Union) Vladimir Sukhov	26(13+13)
3	(Soviet Union) Anatoly Gladyshev	25(11+14)
4	(Czechoslovakia) Zdeněk Kudrna	25(14+11)
5	(Sweden) Hans Johnasson	19(11+8)
6	(Soviet Union) Sergey Tarabanko	18(9+9)
7	(Soviet Union) Boris Bratchikov	17(7+10)
8	(Soviet Union) Sergei Jarovoi	17(9+8
9	(West Germany) Max Niedermaier	15(7+8)
10	(Netherlands) Roelof Thijs	10(6+4)
11	(Sweden) Erik Stenlund	9(4+5)
12	(Czechoslovakia) Jiri Svoboda	9(2+7)
13	(Sweden) Per-Olof Serenius	7(4+3)
14	(Czechoslovakia) Milan Špinka	6(4+2)
15	(West Germany) Rainer Scherzl	2(1+1)
16	(West Germany) Helmut Weber	2(2+0)
17	(Czechoslovakia) Jiri Jirout (res)	0
18	(Czechoslovakia) Stanislav Dyk (res)	0

== See also ==
- 1981 Individual Speedway World Championship in classic speedway
- 1981 Team Ice Racing World Championship
