= Pervomayka =

Pervomayka (Russian: Первомайка) is the name of several rural localities in Russia.

== Modern localities ==
=== Chelyabinsk Oblast ===
As of 2014, three rural localities in Chelyabinsk Oblast bear this name:

Chelyabinsk Oblast distribution map
Distribution of the inhabited localities called Pervomayka in Chelyabinsk Oblast.

- Pervomayka, Kartalinsky District, Chelyabinsk Oblast, a settlement in Poltavsky Selsoviet of Kartalinsky District; 53°04′N 60°57′E
- Pervomayka, Kizilsky District, Chelyabinsk Oblast, a settlement in Granitny Selsoviet of Kizilsky District; 52°58′N 59°09′E
- Pervomayka, Troitsky District, Chelyabinsk Oblast, a settlement in Drobyshevsky Selsoviet of Troitsky District; 54°09′N 61°45′E

=== Kostroma Oblast ===
As of 2014, one rural locality in Kostroma Oblast bears this name:

Kostroma Oblast location map
Location of Pervomayka in Kostroma Oblast

- Pervomayka, Kostroma Oblast, a settlement in Gorchukhinskoye Settlement of Makaryevsky District; 57°38′N 43°39′E

=== Kurgan Oblast ===
As of 2014, one rural locality in Kurgan Oblast bears this name:

Kurgan Oblast location map
Location of Pervomayka in Kurgan Oblast

- Pervomayka, Kurgan Oblast, a village in Kislyansky Selsoviet of Tselinny District; 54°21′N 63°16′E

=== Moscow Oblast ===
As of 2014, one rural locality in Moscow Oblast bears this name:

Moscow Oblast location map
Location of Pervomayka in Moscow Oblast

- Pervomayka, Moscow Oblast, a village in Zabolotyevskoye Rural Settlement of Ramensky District; 55°33′N 38°11′E

=== Perm Krai ===
As of 2014, one rural locality in Perm Krai bears this name:

- Pervomayka, Perm Krai, a village in Vereshchaginsky District

== Abolished localities ==
- Pervomayka, Tomsk Oblast, a village in Kolpashevsky District of Tomsk Oblast; abolished in December 2014

== Alternative names ==
- Pervomayka, alternative name of Pervomayevka, a selo in Pervomayevsky Selsoviet of Zaigrayevsky District in the Republic of Buryatia; 52°02′N 08°24′E
- Pervomayka, alternative name of Pervomayskaya, a village in Oktyabrsky Selsoviet of Petukhovsky District in Kurgan Oblast; 55°02′N 67°56′E
- Pervomayka, alternative name of Vishnevka, a village in Zauralsky Selsoviet of Kargapolsky District in Kurgan Oblast; 55°52′N 64°02′E
