= Kolpashevo Airport =

Kolpashevo Airport Аэропорт Колпашево
- IATA: none; ICAO: UNLL

Summary
- Airport type: Public
- Location: Kolpashevo
- Elevation AMSL: 243 ft / 74 m
- Coordinates: 58°19′36″N 82°56′0″E
- Interactive map of Kolpashevo Airport; Аэропорт Колпашево

Runways
| Direction | Length | | Surface |
| Direction | ft | m | Surface |
|---|---|---|---|
| 16/34 | 4,685 | 1,428 | Concrete |

Kolpashevo Airport (Russian: Аэропорт Колпашево) (ICAO: UNLL) is an airport in Russia located 3 km northeast of Kolpashevo. It is a civilian airfield with a simple utilitarian paved layout and 500 x 50 meter tarmac.

== See also ==
- List of airports in Russia
