= 1980 Individual Ice Speedway World Championship =

Motorcycle ice speedway race

Seasons
- ← 1979 1981 →

The 1980 Individual Ice Speedway World Championship was the 15th edition of the World Championship The Championship was held on 23/24 February 1980 in Kalinin in the Soviet Union.

The winner was Anatoly Bondarenko of the Soviet Union for the second time.

== Classification ==
Pos	Rider	Pts
1	(Soviet Union) Anatoly Bondarenko	29(14+15)
2	(Soviet Union) Sergey Tarabanko	26(15+11)
3	(Soviet Union) Vladimir Sukhov	25(12+13)
4	(Soviet Union) Vladimir Lioubitch	24(11+13)
5	(Czechoslovakia) Zdeněk Kudrna	22(12+10)
6	(Sweden) Hans Johansson	19(9+10)
7	(Soviet Union) Alexander Smyshiliaev	18(9+9)
8	(West Germany) Helmut Weber	14(9+5)
9	(Soviet Union) Viktor Petrunin	14(5+9)
10	(Austria) Walter Wartblichler	12(6+6)
11	(Czechoslovakia) Milan Špinka	10(4+6)
12	(Czechoslovakia) Jiri Jirout	9(4+5
13	(Czechoslovakia) Jiri Svoboda	9(5+4)
14	(Czechoslovakia) Stanislav Dyk	4(3+1)
15	(Sweden) Per-Olof Serenius	4(1+3)
16	(Finland) Tom Hiltunen	1(1+0)
17	(West Germany) Max Niedermaiser (res)	0(dnr+0)
18	(Austria) Kurt Wartbichler (res)	dnr

== See also ==
- 1980 Team Ice Racing World Championship
- 1980 Individual Speedway World Championship in classic speedway
