= Kolpashevo =

Town in Tomsk Oblast, Russia

Kolpashevo Колпашево
- Town under district jurisdiction
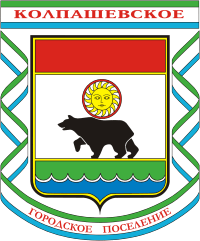
- Coat of arms
- Interactive map of Kolpashevo
- Location of Kolpashevo Kolpashevo (Tomsk Oblast)
- Coordinates: 58°18′N 82°54′E
- Country: Russia
- Federal subject: Tomsk Oblast
- Administrative district: Kolpashevsky District
- Founded: beginning of the 17th century
- Town status since: 1938
- Elevation: 65 m (213 ft)

Population (2010 Census)
  - Total: 24,124
  - Estimate (2021): 20,824 (−13.7%)

Administrative status
  - Capital of: Kolpashevsky District

Municipal status
  - Municipal district: Kolpashevsky Municipal District
  - Urban settlement: Kolpashevskoye Urban Settlement
  - Capital of: Kolpashevsky Municipal District, Kolpashevskoye Urban Settlement
- Time zone: UTC+7 (MSK+4)
- Postal codes: 636460–636465, 636469
- Dialing code: +7 38254
- OKTMO ID: 69632101001

Kolpashevo (Russian: Колпа́шево) is a town and the administrative center of Kolpashevsky District in Tomsk Oblast, Russia, located on the Ob River. Population: 24,124 (2010 census); 28,441 (2002 census); 31,319 (1989 Soviet census).

== History ==
It has existed since the beginning of the 17th century as a village. Town status was granted to it in 1938.

== Mass grave ==
During the Great Purge, Kolpashevo was the site of mass executions carried out by the NKVD, with the corpses of those executed being disposed of in mass graves. In May 1979 meandering of the Ob river caused a mass grave containing more than 1,000 mummified corpses to become exposed. A number of cover-stories were issued by the local government, first that these bones were cattle bones, and then that these were the bodies of deserters from the Second World War. Instead most of the bodies were people from Tomsk. Yegor Ligachev, the provincial party chief, took charge of a cover-up operation to destroy the mass grave using tugs, and used the KGB to coerce local people to dispose of the corpses by sinking them, although some corpses turned up in the sluiceway of a sawmill downstream, mixed with logs floated downstream.

== Administrative and municipal status ==
Within the framework of administrative divisions, Kolpashevo serves as the administrative center of Kolpashevsky District, to which it is directly subordinated. As a municipal division, the town of Kolpashevo, together with three rural localities, is incorporated within Kolpashevsky Municipal District as Kolpashevskoye Urban Settlement.

== Transportation ==
The town is served by the Kolpashevo Airport.

== Climate ==
Kolpashevo has a subarctic climate (Köppen climate classification Dfc), with very cold winters and short, warm summers. Precipitation is moderate and is somewhat higher in summer than at other times of the year.

Climate data for Kolpashevo
Month	Jan	Feb	Mar	Apr	May	Jun	Jul	Aug	Sep	Oct	Nov	Dec	Year
Record high °C (°F)	3.4 (38.1)	4.4 (39.9)	11.0 (51.8)	24.0 (75.2)	33.6 (92.5)	36.1 (97.0)	35.0 (95.0)	32.5 (90.5)	28.9 (84.0)	21.4 (70.5)	7.9 (46.2)	4.6 (40.3)	36.1 (97.0)
Mean daily maximum °C (°F)	−15.4 (4.3)	−12.6 (9.3)	−3.8 (25.2)	5.4 (41.7)	14.1 (57.4)	21.0 (69.8)	24.0 (75.2)	20.2 (68.4)	13.7 (56.7)	3.9 (39.0)	−7.3 (18.9)	−14.0 (6.8)	4.1 (39.4)
Daily mean °C (°F)	−19.8 (−3.6)	−17.8 (0.0)	−10.0 (14.0)	−0.4 (31.3)	8.0 (46.4)	15.2 (59.4)	18.3 (64.9)	14.7 (58.5)	8.5 (47.3)	0.1 (32.2)	−11.1 (12.0)	−18.2 (−0.8)	−1.0 (30.1)
Mean daily minimum °C (°F)	−24.1 (−11.4)	−22.5 (−8.5)	−15.4 (4.3)	−5.4 (22.3)	2.8 (37.0)	9.6 (49.3)	12.7 (54.9)	9.9 (49.8)	4.5 (40.1)	−2.9 (26.8)	−14.8 (5.4)	−22.5 (−8.5)	−5.7 (21.8)
Record low °C (°F)	−48.9 (−56.0)	−50.6 (−59.1)	−40.0 (−40.0)	−32.8 (−27.0)	−13.4 (7.9)	−5.0 (23.0)	2.1 (35.8)	−2.2 (28.0)	−8.5 (16.7)	−28.5 (−19.3)	−48.4 (−55.1)	−49.8 (−57.6)	−50.6 (−59.1)
Average precipitation mm (inches)	23.1 (0.91)	16.4 (0.65)	17.6 (0.69)	23.6 (0.93)	47.2 (1.86)	58.7 (2.31)	71.6 (2.82)	72.8 (2.87)	50.3 (1.98)	44.8 (1.76)	35.6 (1.40)	30.2 (1.19)	491.9 (19.37)
Average precipitation days (≥ 0.1 mm)	23.8	20.0	18.2	14.0	15.3	12.0	13.5	14.9	16.5	21.6	24.8	25.7	220.3
Average relative humidity (%)	80.1	77.9	70.4	62.6	61.8	69.2	74.8	79.2	78.4	79.7	84.7	81.7	75.0
Mean monthly sunshine hours	54.3	109.2	175.1	226.5	260.4	300.0	308.5	243.4	150.0	83.7	52.5	37.2	2,000.8
Source: climatebase.ru

== See also ==
- Mass graves in the Soviet Union
