= 1980 Team Ice Racing World Championship =

Ice speedway event

Ice Speedway of Nations
- Location: Eindhoven, Netherlands
- Start date: March 8 1980
- End date: March 9 1980

The 1980 Team Ice Racing World Championship was the second edition of the Team World Championship. The final was held on 8th/9th March 1980 in Eindhoven in the Netherlands.

The title was won by the Soviet Union.

== Classification ==
| Pos | Riders | Pts |
|---|---|---|
| 1 | (Soviet Union) Anatoly Bondarenko 29, Sergey Tarabanko 28, Vladimir Lioubitch 2 | 59 |
| 2 | (Czechoslovakia) Zdeněk Kudrna 27, Milan Špinka 23, Stanislav Dyk DNR | 50 |
| 3 | (Sweden) Hans Johansson 29, Per-Olof Serenius 6, Börje Sjöbom 2 | 37 |
| 4 | (Austria) Kurt Wartbichler 20, Walter Wartbichler 11, Treumond Strobl 0 | 31 |
| 5 | (West Germany) Helmut Weber 24, Max Niedermaier 6, Leonhard Oswald 0 | 30 |
| 6 | (Finland) Tom Hiltumen 20, Timo Sinkkonen 4, Jarmo Hirvasoja DNR | 24 |
| 7 | (Netherlands) Roelof Thijs 18, André Stoel 2, Hilbert Tel 1 | 21 |

== See also ==
- 1980 Individual Ice Speedway World Championship
- 1980 Speedway World Team Cup in classic speedway
- 1980 Individual Speedway World Championship in classic speedway
