= 1979 West German presidential election =

- 23 May 1979
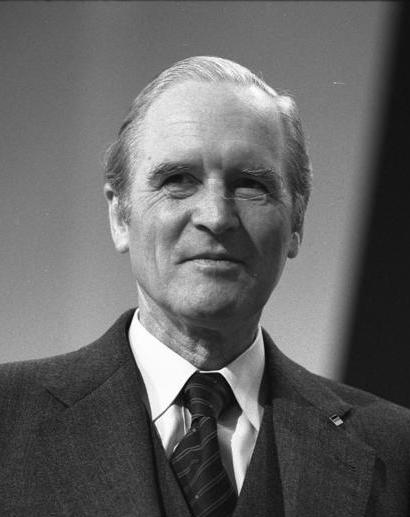

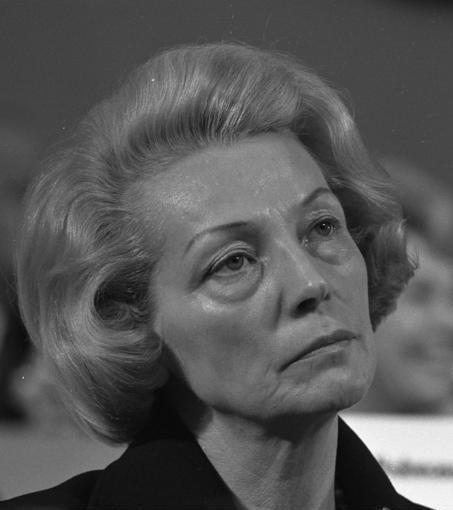
Nominee	Karl Carstens	Annemarie Renger
Party	CDU	SPD
Electoral vote	528	431
Percentage	51%	41.6%
Nominators	CDU/CSU	SPD
President before election
Walter Scheel
FDP
Elected President
Karl Carstens
CDU

An indirect presidential election (officially the 7th Federal Convention) was held in West Germany on 23 May 1979. Deeming his reelection to be unlikely, incumbent Walter Scheel elected not to seek a second term. The two candidates to replace him were the president of the Bundestag, Karl Carstens, nominated by the Christian Democratic Union, and Carstens' immediate predecessor, Annemarie Renger, nominated by the Social Democratic Party. Carstens won the election on the first ballot.

== Composition of the Federal Convention ==
The president is elected by the Federal Convention consisting of all the members of the Bundestag and an equal number of delegates representing the states. These are divided proportionally by population to each state, and each state's delegation is divided among the political parties represented in its parliament so as to reflect the partisan proportions in the parliament.

By Party		By State	
Party	Members	State	Members
CDU/CSU	531	Bundestag	518
SPD	438	Baden-Württemberg	75
FDP	66	Bavaria	92
Independents	1	Berlin	16
Total	1036	Bremen	6
		Hamburg	14
		Hesse	46
		Lower Saxony	63
		North Rhine-Westphalia	143
		Rhineland-Palatinate	31
		Saarland	9
		Schleswig-Holstein	23
		Total	1036

Source: Eine Dokumentation aus Anlass der Wahl des Bundespräsidenten am 18. März 2012

== Results ==
Candidate	Parties	Votes	%
Karl Carstens	CDU/CSU	528	51.0
Annemarie Renger	SPD	431	41.6
Abstentions		72	6.9
Invalid votes		1	0.1
Not present		4	0.4
Total		1,036	100
Source Bundestag
