= Raymond Lee Harvey =

American failed assassin

Raymond Lee Harvey (born 1944 or 1945) is an American drifter. Born in Ohio, he was arrested by the United States Secret Service after being found carrying a starter pistol with blank rounds, ten minutes before President Jimmy Carter was to give a speech at the Civic Center Mall in Los Angeles on May 5, 1979.

== Background ==
Harvey claimed that he was part of a four-man operation to assassinate the president, after having been approached by three Latino men staying at the Alan Hotel who gave him a starter pistol, and asked him to shoot it into the ground to create a diversion, so they could then shoot the president from their hotel room during the distraction. According to Harvey, he fired seven blank rounds from the starter pistol on the hotel roof on the night of May 4, to test how much noise it would make. He then spent the night in a room taken by one of the men, whom he knew as "Julio", but who was later identified as a 21-year-old illegal Mexican alien who gave the name Osvaldo Espinoza Ortiz. At the time of his arrest, Harvey had eight spent rounds in his pocket, as well as 70 unspent blank rounds for the gun.

Although he had a history of mental illness, and his claims were originally dismissed as "a tale spun by an intoxicated man," Harvey's claims were investigated by police, who found a room in the Alan Hotel, containing a shotgun case and three unspent rounds of ammunition, and booked for the night under the name "Umberto Camacho," the name of an alleged conspirator given by Ortiz. The occupant had checked out of the hotel room the day of the alleged assassination attempt.

== Aftermath ==
Harvey was jailed on a $50,000 bond, given his transient status, and Ortiz was alternately reported as being held on a $100,000 bond as a material witness or held on a $50,000 bond being charged with burglary from a car. Charges against the pair were ultimately dismissed for a lack of evidence.

His age at the time of the event has been alternately given as 34 or 35.

The names "Lee Harvey" and "Osvaldo" (Osvaldo is the Spanish equivalent to "Oswald") drew comparisons to Lee Harvey Oswald, who was suspected of having assassinated President John F. Kennedy. This led some to believe that the incident was set up to scare Carter into submission.

== See also ==
- List of United States presidential assassination attempts and plots
