= 1981 Team Ice Racing World Championship =

Ice speedway event

Ice Speedway of Nations
- Location: Inzell, West Germany
- Start date: 7 February 1981
- End date: 8 February 1981

The 1981 Team Ice Racing World Championship was the third edition of the Team World Championship. The final was held on 7/8 February, 1981 in Inzell, West Germany.

The title was won by the Soviet Union.

== Classification ==
Pos	Riders	Pts
1	(Soviet Union) Anatoli Gladishev 21, Vladimir Suchov 20, Sergei Tarabanko 12	53
2	(Czechoslovakia) Zdenek Kudrna 26, Milan Spinka 17, Stanislav Dyk DNR	43
3	(Sweden) Hans Johansson 31, Karl Ivar Wattman 11, Per-Olof Serenius DNR	42
4	(Austria) Walter Wartbichler 22, Kurt Wartbichler 20, Franz Schiefer 0	42
5	(West Germany) Helmut Weber 26, Max Niedermaier 10, Albert Stickl DNR	36
6	(Finland) Jarmo Hirvasoja 10, Timo Sinkkonen 5, Toni Hiltunen 3	18
7	(Netherlands) Roelof Thijs 14, Andre Stroel 4, Hilbert Tel 0	18

== See also ==
- 1981 Individual Ice Speedway World Championship
- 1981 Speedway World Team Cup in classic speedway
- 1981 Individual Speedway World Championship in classic speedway
