= Alan Hotel =

Former hotel in Los Angeles

Coordinates: 34.049°N 118.242°W

The Alan Hotel was a hotel located in the Little Tokyo neighborhood in Downtown Los Angeles, California. The hotel was established in 1942, and was built directly across from the noted Civic Center Mall. Its address was 236 East Second Street.

The hotel was noted for housing a large population of African Americans, and figured prominently in the alleged attempted assassination of Jimmy Carter in May 1979. The hotel was demolished in 1986 following a lawsuit demanding eviction settlements for the displaced residents, and to prepare for the construction of the Parker Center.
