= Annemarie Renger =

German politician (1919–2008)

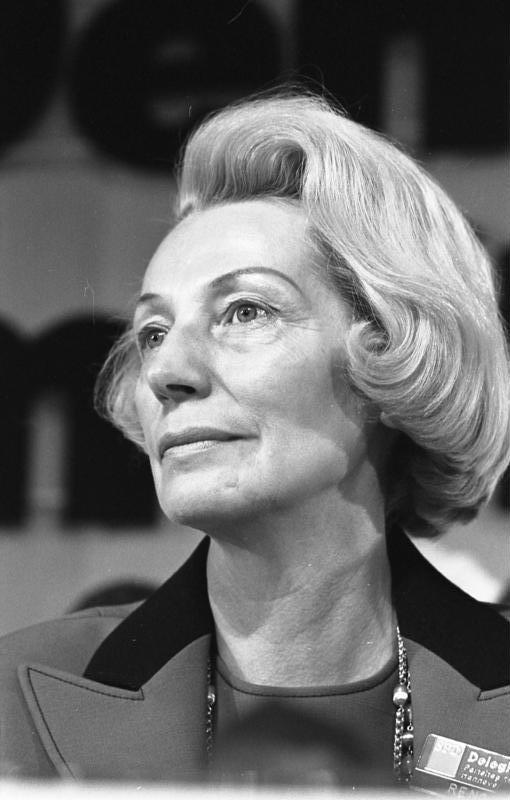
- Renger in 1973

President of the Bundestag West Germany
- In office 13 December 1972 – 14 December 1976
- Preceded by: Kai-Uwe von Hassel
- Succeeded by: Karl Carstens

Vice President of the Bundestag (on proposal of the SPD-group)
- In office 1976–1990
- Preceded by: Hermann Schmidt-Vockenhausen
- Succeeded by: Helmut Becker

Personal details
- Born: Annemarie Wildung; 7 October 1919 Leipzig, Germany
- Died: 3 March 2008 (aged 88) Remagen, Germany
- Party: SPD
- only SPD predecessors and successors in her office of Vice President are mentioned

Annemarie Renger (née Wildung; 7 October 1919 – 3 March 2008) was a German politician for the Social Democratic Party of Germany (SPD).

From 1972 until 1976 she served as the fifth president of the Bundestag. She was the first woman to hold this office and the first woman to hold one of the five highest federal offices of the Federal Republic of Germany.

She was nominated as the presidential candidate of the SPD in 1979, the first woman to be nominated for president by a major party.

== Biography ==
Annemarie Renger attended the "Augusta-Lyzeum" in Berlin, an all female high school. Her scholarship was withdrawn and she was forced to leave the institution in 1934 after it was found out that her parents' political attitude did not coincide with that of the ruling Nazi party. Renger instead entered vocational training to become, and then worked as, a bookseller and publisher in Berlin.

Later she worked as a private secretary for Kurt Schumacher, the leader of the Social Democratic Party. In 1946 she became office manager for the SPD party executive committee in Hannover and later in Bonn.

=== Family ===
Annemarie Renger's family was rooted in the social democratic movement. Her grandfather was an active party member. Annemarie was one of seven children born to Fritz Wildung (1872–1954; a carpenter, SPD politician and sports executive) and his wife Martha (1881–?), who joined the SPD in 1908—the first year women in Germany were eligible to join political parties. In 1924, her father became executive director of the "Zentralkommission für Arbeitersport" ("Central Committee for Workers' Sports") in Berlin. The Nazis prohibited him from working and persecuted him.

=== Life ===
In 1938, Annemarie Wildung married Emil Ernst Renger, an advertising manager, who was killed in 1944 while on military duty in France. Their son, Rolf Renger (1938–1998), later a member of the Free Democratic Party (FDP), and whom she survived, did not get to know his father. Annemarie Renger's husband died when she was 26 years old. She also lost three of her brothers to war.

In 1945, she met Kurt Schumacher, and became his closest confidant and partner until his death in 1952. In 1965, Annemarie Renger married Aleksandar Loncarevic, an economist from Yugoslavia. Their marriage lasted until his death in 1973. After 1965, the couple lived in Oberwinter near Bonn.

=== Political career ===
Renger's association with the SPD continued through the horror of the Nazi regime. After the fall of the Hitler regime she wanted to take use of the newly gained liberty:

"Before us lay the rubble of Germany. I was firmly determined to get myself involved in politics, and to participate in building a democratic Germany. I wanted to help ensure that the world would never experience war again."

==== Party career ====
Annemarie Renger became a member of the SPD in 1945. On 1 October, she took up the position of a private secretary to Kurt Schumacher. She later said that since the age of 10, she had wanted to later become a "party secretary". Upon reading one of his speeches titled "Wir verzweifeln nicht" ("We do not despair") her attention was called to Kurt Schumacher, leader of the Social Democratic Party, who had been tortured in the concentration camps by the Nazis. She wanted to meet the author of these lines.

The photograph showing Renger supporting Kurt Schumacher, a German anti-Nazi politician and double amputee, has become an icon of German post-war history.

After the 1972 federal election, the SPD held a plurality of seats and thus, with the support of the Free Democrats, on 13 December 1972, was able to elect her as president of the Bundestag.

Since 1973, Renger had been a member of the SPD "federal party committee" as well as the party's chairmanship. From 1979 until 1983, she served in the party's "control commission". In addition to Egon Franke, Annemarie Renger was considered a leading member of the so-called "Kanalarbeiterriege" (engl. "Sewage Workers Guild"), a powerful group of SPD members of the Bundestag in the years 1957 through 1982. Their political orientation was rather conservative and union-friendly. In 1982, the "Sewage Workers Guild" merged with the Seeheimer Kreis.

==== Candidacy for the Office of Federal President ====
In 1979, Annemarie Renger was nominated by her party as a candidate for the Office of the Federal President (Bundespräsident), but lost by a margin of 431 to 528 electoral votes to Karl Carstens, the candidate of the CDU and CSU parties. The 66 electoral delegates seated by the Free Democratic Party (FDP) abstained.

“She not only perceived the SPD [party] as a political interest group but, foremost, as a community of like-minded people. This community not only appealed to the mind, but to heart and emotion, as well. Here she learned to not only contemplate, but to comprehend the world. Hier lernte sie die Welt nicht nur zu betrachten, sondern zu begreifen. Here, she found support. Here, [her] will arose to help better the world. The bonds and mouldings developed here were so strong, that they held through [her] lifetime. "

— Gerhard Schröder, former Chancellor of the Federal Republic of Germany

==== Member of the Bundestag ====
In 1953, Annemarie Renger won her seat as Member of the Bundestag, and held it through 1990. From 1959 until 1966 she, as well, served as a member of the Advisory Conference of the European Council and the Western European Union.

From 1969 until 1972 she served as "Parlamentarische Geschäftsführerin" (Majority whip) of the SPD. She was the first woman to enter the internal leadership of the SPD parliamentary group (German: “Fraktion”) in the Bundestag.

After the SPD, for the first time in German history, had won the majority of seats in the Bundestag in the 1972 federal election, Annemarie Renger on 13 December 1972, was elected president of the Bundestag – the first woman to hold this office in Germany and the first woman in the world holding such office in a freely elected parliament. Later Renger said: “I myself proposed my running for this office to the members of our Bundestag parliamentary group. You think, they really had chosen me [for the job, had I not proposed that myself]?“

At the same time she chaired two subcommittees of the "Council of Elders of the Bundestag": the "Subcommittee on Budget" and the "Subcommitte on Issues of Taxation of Remuneration for Members of the Bundestag". She also was chairperson of the "Joint Committee" ("Gemeinsamer Ausschuss nach Artikel 53a des Grundgesetzes").

Following the 1976 federal election, the Christian Democratic Union (CDU) and its sister party, the Christian Social Union in Bavaria (CSU) regained plurality in the Bundestag, and Karl Carstens followed Annemarie Renger as president of the Bundestag. Renger was elected vice president of the Bundestag and served in this function until her resignation from the Bundestag prior to the 1990 federal election. During her term as Deputy-President, she chaired several committees of the "Council of Elders of the Bundestag". From 24 June 1977 until 1983, Annemarie Renger served as vice-chairperson of the Bundestag Foreign Relations Committee.

During the voting on the SPD motion on the NATO Double-Track Decision (NATO-Doppelbeschluss) held on 22 November 1983, which called for additional negotiations with the Soviet Union prior to stationing of Intermediate Range Nuclear Weapons in Europe, she abstained together with 24 party colleagues of the SPD, among them Helmut Schmidt and Egon Franke, Dieter Haack, Karl Ahrens and Hans Matthöfer from the party's right wing.

== Social dedication ==
From 1985 on, Annemarie Renger served as president of the “Arbeiter-Samariter-Bund Deutschland”, a non-profit relief and welfare organisation, which is a member of the European “Samariter International e.V.” (SAINT) . From 1987 until 1998 she was chairwoman of the supervisory board of “McDonald’s Kinderhilfe” (Children Support Fund). From 1991 until 1995 she chaired the „Vereinigung ehemaliger Mitglieder des Deutschen Bundestages und des europäischen Parlaments e. V.“ (Association of Former Members of the German Bundestag and the European Parliament).

She was chairwoman of the Central Association of Organisations of Democratic Resistance Fighters and the Persecuted, president of the Kurt Schumacher Society, and honorary president of "Netzwerk Europäische Bewegung Deutschland" (Network European Movement)

== Awards ==
Annemarie Renger received various commendations for her special engagement to the German-Jewish-Israeli relationship. Having served as head of the German-Israeli Parliamentary Group for 14 years, in 1992 she was awarded the Buber Rosenzweig Medal, together with Hildegard Hamm-Brücher. She held an honorary doctorate of the Ben-Gurion-University of Negev. In 2006 she received the "Heinz-Galinski-Preis" ("Heinz-Galinski-Award") of the Berlin Jewish Community. Annemarie Renger has been awarded the Bundesverdienstkreuz (Federal Cross of Merit, officially: “Verdienstorden der Bundesrepublik Deutschland”, “Order of Merit of the Federal Republic of Germany”).

== Trivia ==
Annemarie Renger is commonly regarded as a "Grande Dame", the last of the grand ladies of the German Social Democratic movement. This is owed not only to her political influence, her life in a social democratic community, or to her age, but also to her demeanor. Renger set great value on style and appearance. She had a preference for sports cars and mink coats. There are anecdotes about her remark to Gerhard Schröder, then (1980) newly elected Member of the Bundestag and chairman of the SPD “Juso" (abbreviation for "Young Socialists") youth organisation (and later to become Federal Chancellor) about him failing to wear a necktie: „Genosse [(comrade)] Schröder, you will have to wear a necktie for tomorrow's election of the Bundeskanzler – as called for by custom". Schröder followed her order and, at a later occasion, remarked: 'For her, wearing proper attire was a sign of respect towards a constitutional body of democratic Germany. The institutions of parliamentary democracy had to be respected. For Annemarie Renger, they were emitting grace of their own, and this was not to be violated.'

== Quotes ==
"I have achieved what I wanted to. It has been demonstrated that a woman can do it."

— Annemarie Renger, Former President of the German Bundestag

"I am part of Social Democracy."

— Annemarie Renger, Former President of the German Bundestag

"We have lost a great Parliamentarian, a dedicated Democrat, a Member of the Bundestag with heart and soul. Annemarie Renger was the first woman and the first Social Democrat in the history of the German Bundestag to hold this office, and she executed her duties gladly and convincingly – with determination and dignity. Characteristic of her was her sometimes energetic assertiveness which every parliamentarian – across party lines – was able to experience."

— Norbert Lammert, Former President of the German Bundestag

== Literature ==
- "Sozialdemokratie und Parlament", in: Beiträge zu Einzelproblemen des „Entwurfs eines ökonomisch-politischen Orientierungsrahmens für die Jahre 1973–1985“. Bonn-Bad Godesberg 1973, pg. 29–37.
- "Parlamentarierinnen in den europäischen Versammlungen", in: Wolf Frühauf, ed., Wissenschaft und Weltbild. Festschrift für Hertha Firnberg. Wien 1975, pg. 49–56.
- Annemarie Renger, Karl Carstens, Alfred Ollesch: Selbstverständnis. Der Bundestag im Spiegel dreier Debattenbeiträge. Bonn 1977.
- "Die Konferenz der Europäischen Parlamentspräsidenten – Ursprung und Ziele", in: Heinz Rosenbauer, Volkmar Gabert: Parlamentarismus und Föderalismus. Festschrift für Rudolf Hanauer aus Anlass seines 70. Geburtstages. Ehrenwirth, München 1978, pg. 184–189, ISBN 3-431-02064-X.
- "Berechtigte Kritik hält lebendig. Der Bundestag ist anpassungsfähig und reformbereit geblieben", in: Hartmut Klatt: Der Bundestag im Verfassungsgefüge der Bundesrepublik Deutschland. Bonn 1980, pg. 141–144.
- "Notwendigkeit und Formen einer parlamentarischen Planungsbegleitung", in: Jürgen Jekewitz, Michael Melzer, Wolfgang Zeh: Politik als gelebte Verfassung. Festschrift für Friedrich Schäfer. Westdeutscher Verl., Opladen 1980, pg. 87–92, ISBN 3-531-11500-6.
- Fasziniert von Politik. Beiträge zu Zeit. Seewald, Stuttgart 1981, ISBN 3-512-00610-8
- "Der zentrale Ort der Politik", in: Eckart Busch: Parlamentarische Demokratie. Festschrift für Helmut Schellknecht zum 65. Geburtstag. Heidelberg 1984, pg. 3–8.
- "Eine faszinierende Aufgabe", in: Rupert Schick: Der Bundestagspräsident. Stuttgart 1987 (9th edition), pg. 117–122, ISBN 3-87959-315-9.
- "Braucht der Staat des Grundgesetzes Elemente direkter Demokratie?", in: Philipp Jenninger: Unverdrossen für Europa. Festschrift für Kai-Uwe von Hassel zum 75. Geburtstag. Nomos, Baden-Baden 1988, pg. 339–345, ISBN 3-7890-1576-8.
- "Vierzig Jahre Deutscher Bundestag. Erfahrungen und Maßstäbe", in: Aus Politik und Zeitgeschichte. Bonn 1989, Heft 37,38, pg. 7–12. ISSN 0479-611X
- Ein politisches Leben. Erinnerungen. Deutsche Verlagsanstalt, Stuttgart 1993, ISBN 3-421-06532-2

== See also ==
- Seeheimer Kreis
