= Anatoly Gladyshev =

Russian ice speedway rider

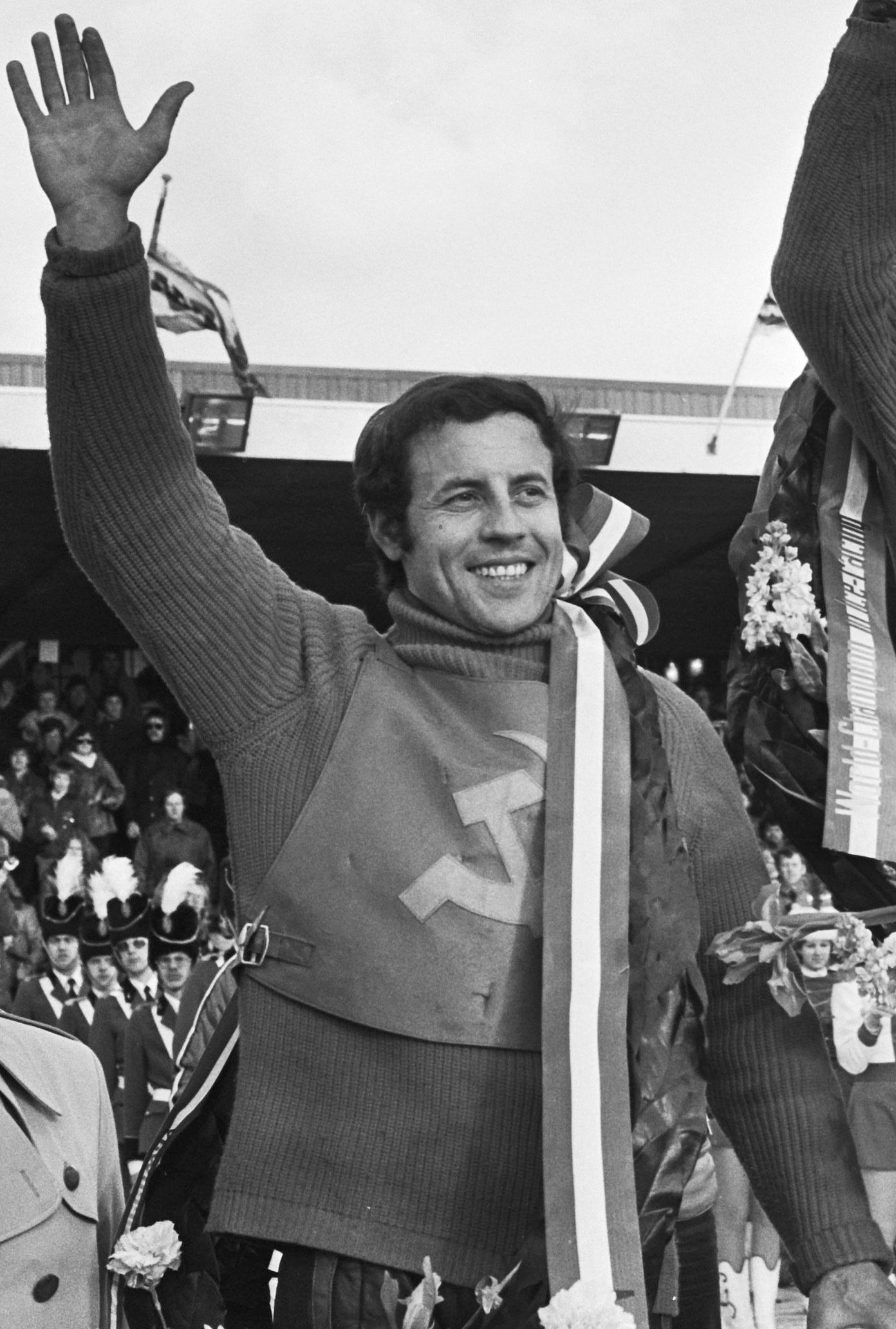
- Anatoly Gladyshev at the 1978 World Championships

Personal information
- Born: 1947 Rubtsovsk, Russia
- Died: 19 February 1984 (aged 37) Moscow, Russia

Sport
- Sport: Ice speedway
Medal record
Representing the Soviet Union
World Ice Championships
Bronze medal – third place	1978 Assen	Individual
Gold medal – first place	1979 Inzell	Team
Gold medal – first place	1981 Assen	Team
Bronze medal – third place	1981 Assen	Individual

Anatoly Vasilievich (Russian: Анатолий Васильевич Гладышев, 1947 – 19 February 1984) was a Russian ice speedway rider who won two world titles in 1978–1981.

== Career ==
Gladyshev won the bronze medal at the 1978 Individual Ice Speedway World Championship and two team golds at the 1979 Team Ice Racing World Championship and 1981 Team Ice Racing World Championship.

Gladyshev died at a race during the 23rd heat of the 1984 Individual Ice Speedway World Championship in Moscow on 19 February 1984. After colliding with Vitaly Russkikh, he fell into the path of Walter Wartbichler who was unable to avoid colliding with him. He suffered an artery rupture caused by the front tyre of the bike and died later in hospital. Gladyshev was 37 and should have retired to assume a position of mechanic in the national team but continued competing mostly to replace injured teammates.

At the time of his death, Gladyshev was married to his wife Diana and had two sons, Stanislav and Dmitri. After Gladyshev's death, between 1985 and 1991 an annual race in his honor was held in Irkutsk, where he lived for many years.
