= Anatoly Bondarenko =

Russian ice speedway rider (born 1949)

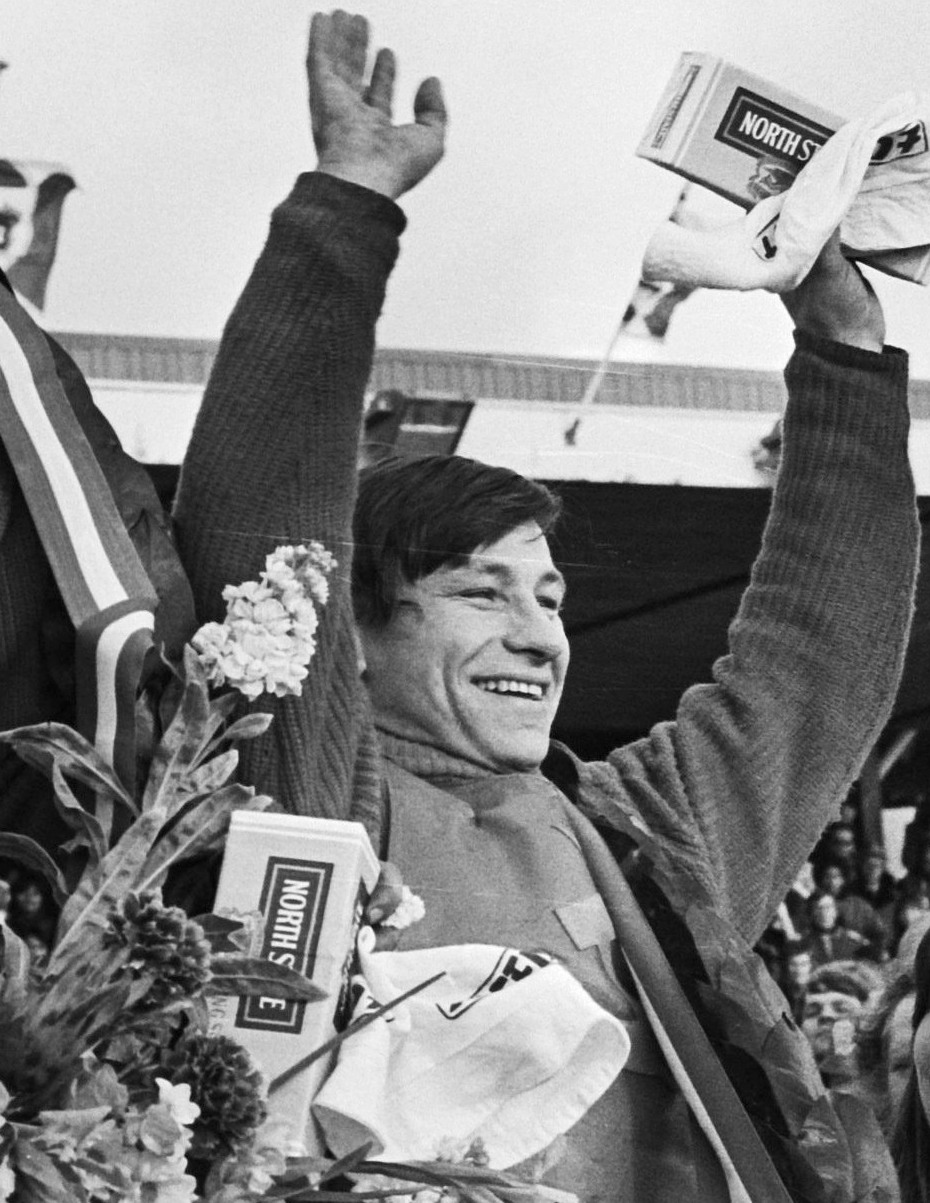
- Anatoly Bondarenko at the 1978 World Championships

Personal information
- Born: 10 October 1949 (age 76) Orsk, Soviet Union

Sport
- Sport: Ice speedway
Medal record
Representing the Soviet Union
World championships
Silver medal – second place	1978 Assen	Individual
Gold medal – first place	1979 Inzell	Team
Gold medal – first place	1979 Inzell	Individual
Gold medal – first place	1980 Kalinin	Team
Gold medal – first place	1980 Kalinin	Individual
Silver medal – second place	1983 Eindhoven	Individual

Anatoly Nikolaevich Bondarenko (Russian: Анатолий Николаевич Бондаренко; born 25 August 1949) is a retired Russian ice speedway rider who won two Individual Ice Speedway World Championship's in 1979 and 1980, and two Team Ice Racing World Championships in 1979 and 1980.

== World final appearance s ==
=== Ice World Championship ===
- 1978 – (Netherlands) Assen, 2nd – 24pts
- 1979 – (West Germany) Inzell, champion – 30pts
- 1980 – (Soviet Union) Kalinin, champion – 29pts
- 1983 (Netherlands) Eindhoven, 2nd - 28pts

== Family ==
His brother Nikolai Bondarenko and nephew Ilya Bondarenko are also retired speedway riders.
