= Kolpashevsky District =

Kolpashevsky District Колпашевский район (Russian)
- District
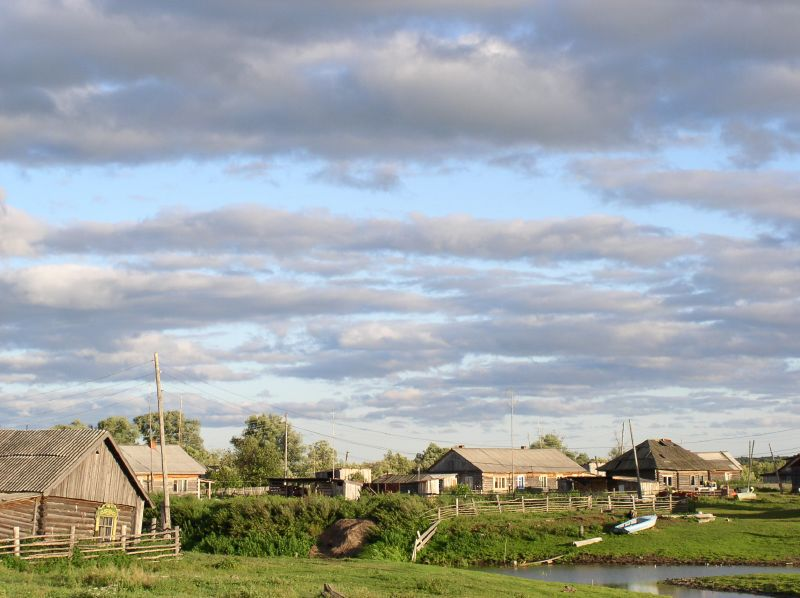
- Village Ivankino, Kolpashevsky District

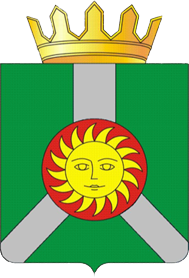
- Coat of arms
- Location of Kolpashevsky District in Tomsk Oblast
- Coordinates: 58°19′N 82°55′E
- Country: Russia
- Federal subject: Tomsk Oblast
- Established: 14 October 1926
- Administrative center: Kolpashevo

Area
  - Total: 17,112 km^{2} (6,607 sq mi)

Population (2010 Census)
  - Total: 41,183
  - Density: 2.4067/km^{2} (6.2333/sq mi)
  - Urban: 58.6%
  - Rural: 41.4%

Administrative structure
  - Inhabited localities: 1 cities/towns, 36 rural localities

Municipal structure
  - Municipally incorporated as: Kolpashevsky Municipal District
  - Municipal divisions: 1 urban settlements, 8 rural settlements
- Time zone: UTC+7 (MSK+4)
- OKTMO ID: 69632000
- Website: http://www.kolpadm.ru/

Kolpashevsky District (Russian: Колпа́шевский райо́н) is an administrative and municipal district (raion), one of the sixteen in Tomsk Oblast, Russia. It is located in the center of the oblast. The area of the district is 17,112 square kilometers (6,607 sq mi). Its administrative center is the town of Kolpashevo. Population: 41,183 (2010 Census); 19,723 (2002 census); 22,689 (1989 Soviet census). The population of Kolpashevo accounts for 58.6% of the district's total population.
