= 2021 Speedway Grand Prix of Poland =

Speedway Grand Prix event

- Venue: Olympic Stadium; MOSiR Stadium (Bystrzyca); MotoArena Toruń
- Location: Wrocław; Lublin; Toruń
- Start date: 30/31 July; 6/7 August; 1/2 October
- Competitors: 16 (2 reserves)

The 2021 FIM Speedway Grand Prix of Poland was the third, fourth, fifth, sixth, tenth and eleventh rounds of the 2021 Speedway Grand Prix season (the World Championship). The calendar of events was severely disrupted by the effects of the COVID-19 pandemic and therefore Poland held six rounds of the eleven rounds of the 2021 World Championship.

The third and fourth rounds took place on 30 & 31 July 2021 at the Olympic Stadium in Wrocław. The fifth and sixth rounds were held on 6 and 7 August at the MOSiR Stadium (Bystrzyca) in Lublin and finally the last two rounds were held on 1 & 2 October at the MotoArena Toruń in Toruń.

The rounds were the 48th to 53rd Speedway Grand Prix of Poland.

Four of the rounds were won by the defending world champion Bartosz Zmarzlik (his 11th, 12th, 13th and 15th career Grand Prix wins respectively). The other two rounds were won by Artem Laguta (his 3rd and 6th career Grand Prix wins) and the Russian went on to win the World Championship.

== Results ==
=== Event 1 - Betard Wrocław Grand Prix (30 July) ===
| Placing | Rider | 1 | 2 | 3 | 4 | 5 | 6 | 7 | 8 | 9 | 10 | 11 | 12 | 13 | 14 | 15 | 16 | 17 | 18 | 19 | 20 | Pts | SF1 | SF2 | Final | GP Pts |
|---|---|---|---|---|---|---|---|---|---|---|---|---|---|---|---|---|---|---|---|---|---|---|---|---|---|---|
| 1 | (Poland) (14) Bartosz Zmarzlik | | | | 3 | | 2 | | | | | 3 | | 3 | | | | | | | 2 | 13 | | 2 | 3 | 20 |
| 2 | (Poland) (10) Maciej Janowski | | | 2 | | | 1 | | | | | | 2 | | | 3 | | 1 | | | | 9 | 3 | | 2 | 18 |
| 3 | (Russia) (11) Artem Laguta | | | 3 | | | | 3 | | 2 | | | | | 2 | | | | | | 3 | 13 | | 3 | 1 | 16 |
| 4 | (Russia) (13) Emil Sayfutdinov | | | | 1 | 1 | | | | | | | 3 | | 3 | | | | | 2 | | 10 | 2 | | x | 14 |
| 5 | (Sweden) (15) Freddie Lindgren | | | | 2 | | | 0 | | | 2 | | | | | | 2 | 2 | | | | 8 | | 1 | | 12 |
| 6 | (Denmark) (1) Leon Madsen | 3 | | | | 3 | | | | 3 | | | | 2 | | | | 3 | | | | 14 | x | | | 11 |
| 7 | (Slovakia) (12) Martin Vaculík | | | 0 | | | | | 3 | | 3 | | | 1 | | | | | | 3 | | 10 | | 0 | | 10 |
| 8 | (United Kingdom) (6) Robert Lambert | | 3 | | | | 3 | | | 1 | | | | | | | 3 | | | 1 | | 11 | t | | | 9 |
| 9 | (Denmark) (7) Anders Thomsen | | 1 | | | | | 2 | | | | | 1 | 0 | | | | | 3 | | | 7 | | | | 8 |
| 10 | (Australia) (16) Max Fricke | | | | 0 | | | | 2 | 0 | | | | | | 2 | | | 2 | | | 6 | | | | 7 |
| 11 | (United Kingdom) (2) Tai Woffinden | 2 | | | | | 0 | | | | 1 | | | | 1 | | | | 1 | | | 5 | | | | 6 |
| 12 | (Australia) (3) Jason Doyle | 1 | | | | | | 1 | | | | 2 | | | | 1 | | | | 0 | | 5 | | | | 5 |
| 13 | (Slovenia) (8) Matej Žagar | | 2 | | | | | | 1 | | | 1 | | | 0 | | | 0 | | | | 4 | | | | 4 |
| 14 | (Poland) (9) Gleb Chugunov | | | 1 | | 2 | | | | | | 0 | | | | | 1 | | 0 | | | 4 | | | | 3 |
| 15 | (Sweden) (5) Oliver Berntzon | | 0 | | | 0 | | | | | 0 | | | | | 0 | | | | | 1 | 1 | | | | 2 |
| 16 | (Poland) (4) Krzysztof Kasprzak | t | | | | | | | 0 | | | | 0 | | | | 0 | | | | 0 | 0 | | | | 1 |
| R1 | (Poland) (R1) Tobiasz Musielak | 0 | | | | | | | | | | | | | | | | | | | | 0 | R1 | | | |
| R2 | (Poland) (R2) Bartłomiej Kowalski | | | | | | | | | | | | | | | | | | | | | 0 | R2 | | | |

m - exclusion for exceeding two minute time allowance • t - exclusion for touching the tapes • x - other exclusion • e - retired or mechanical failure • f - fell • ns - non-starter • nc - non-classify

| gate A - inside | gate B | gate C | gate D - outside |

=== Event 2 - Betard Wrocław Grand Prix (31 July) ===
| Placing | Rider | 1 | 2 | 3 | 4 | 5 | 6 | 7 | 8 | 9 | 10 | 11 | 12 | 13 | 14 | 15 | 16 | 17 | 18 | 19 | 20 | Pts | SF1 | SF2 | Final | GP Pts |
|---|---|---|---|---|---|---|---|---|---|---|---|---|---|---|---|---|---|---|---|---|---|---|---|---|---|---|
| 1 | (Poland) (4) Bartosz Zmarzlik | 2 | | | | | | | 2 | | | | 2 | | | | 3 | | | | 3 | 12 | | 3 | 3 | 20 |
| 2 | (Russia) (10) Artem Laguta | | | 3 | | | 2 | | | | | | 3 | | | 3 | | 2 | | | | 13 | | 2 | 2 | 18 |
| 3 | (Denmark) (11) Leon Madsen | | | 2 | | | | 2 | | 2 | | | | | 3 | | | | | | 2 | 11 | 3 | | 1 | 16 |
| 4 | (United Kingdom) (1) Tai Woffinden | 3 | | | | 3 | | | | 3 | | | | 2 | | | | 3 | | | | 14 | 2 | | 0 | 14 |
| 5 | (Russia) (7) Emil Sayfutdinov | | 1 | | | | | 3 | | | | | 0 | 3 | | | | | 0 | | | 7 | 1 | | | 12 |
| 6 | (Australia) (3) Max Fricke | 1 | | | | | | 0 | | | | 3 | | | | 1 | | | | 2 | | 7 | | 1 | | 11 |
| 7 | (Poland) (15) Maciej Janowski | | | | 3 | | | 1 | | | 3 | | | | | | 2 | 1 | | | | 10 | | 0 | | 10 |
| 8 | (United Kingdom) (16) Robert Lambert | | | | 1 | | | | 3 | 1 | | | | | | 2 | | | 2 | | | 9 | 0 | | | 9 |
| 9 | (Sweden) (2) Freddie Lindgren | 0 | | | | | 3 | | | | 2 | | | | 1 | | | | 1 | | | 7 | | | | 8 |
| 10 | (Australia) (8) Jason Doyle | | 2 | | | | | | 1 | | | 2 | | | 2 | | | x | | | | 7 | | | | 7 |
| 11 | (Slovakia) (5) Martin Vaculík | | 3 | | | 1 | | | | | 0 | | | | | 0 | | | | | 1 | 5 | | | | 6 |
| 12 | (Poland) (9) Gleb Chugunov | | | 1 | | 0 | | | | | | 1 | | | | | e | | 3 | | | 5 | | | | 5 |
| 13 | (Denmark) (12) Anders Thomsen | | | 0 | | | | | 0 | | 1 | | | 0 | | | | | | 3 | | 4 | | | | 4 |
| 14 | (Sweden) (14) Oliver Berntzon | | | | 2 | | 1 | | | | | 0 | | 1 | | | | | | | 0 | 4 | | | | 3 |
| 15 | (Slovenia) (13) Matej Žagar | | | | 0 | 2 | | | | | | | 1 | | 0 | | | | | 1 | | 4 | | | | 2 |
| 16 | (Poland) (6) Krzysztof Kasprzak | | 0 | | | | 0 | | | 0 | | | | | | | 1 | | | 0 | | 1 | | | | 1 |
| R1 | (Poland) (R1) Tobiasz Musielak | | | | | | | | | | | | | | | | | t | | | | 0 | R1 | | | |
| R2 | (Poland) (R2) Bartłomiej Kowalski | | | | | | | | | | | | | | | | | 0 | | | | 0 | R2 | | | |

m - exclusion for exceeding two minute time allowance • t - exclusion for touching the tapes • x - other exclusion • e - retired or mechanical failure • f - fell • ns - non-starter • nc - non-classify

| gate A - inside | gate B | gate C | gate D - outside |

=== Event 3 - Orlen Lublin Grand Prix (6 August) ===
| Placing | Rider | 1 | 2 | 3 | 4 | 5 | 6 | 7 | 8 | 9 | 10 | 11 | 12 | 13 | 14 | 15 | 16 | 17 | 18 | 19 | 20 | Pts | SF1 | SF2 | Final | GP Pts |
|---|---|---|---|---|---|---|---|---|---|---|---|---|---|---|---|---|---|---|---|---|---|---|---|---|---|---|
| 1 | (Poland) (6) Bartosz Zmarzlik | | 3 | | | | 3 | | | 2 | | | | | | | 1 | | | 3 | | 12 | 3 | | 3 | 20 |
| 2 | (Poland) (11) Dominik Kubera | | | 3 | | | | 2 | | 3 | | | | | 2 | | | | | | 2 | 12 | | 2 | 2 | 18 |
| 3 | (Sweden) (4) Freddie Lindgren | 2 | | | | | | | 3 | | | | 3 | | | | 0 | | | | 3 | 11 | 2 | | 1 | 16 |
| 4 | (Russia) (14) Artem Laguta | | | | 3 | | 2 | | | | | 3 | | 3 | | | | | | | 1 | 12 | | 3 | 0 | 14 |
| 5 | (Australia) (15) Jason Doyle | | | | 1 | | | 3 | | | 3 | | | | | | 3 | 0 | | | | 10 | | 1 | | 12 |
| 6 | (United Kingdom) (3) Tai Woffinden | 3 | | | | | | 2 | | | | 2 | | | | 1 | | | | 2 | | 10 | 1 | | | 11 |
| 7 | (Denmark) (10) Leon Madsen | | | 2 | | | 0 | | | | | | 2 | | | 3 | | 2 | | | | 9 | 0 | | | 10 |
| 8 | (Russia) (2) Emil Sayfutdinov | 0 | | | | | 1 | | | | 2 | | | | 3 | | | | 1 | | | 7 | | 0 | | 9 |
| 9 | (Australia) (5) Max Fricke | | 1 | | | 3 | | | | | 1 | | | | | 2 | | | | | 0 | 7 | | | | 8 |
| 10 | (Slovenia) (13) Matej Žagar | | | | 2 | 2 | | | | | | | 1 | | 1 | | | | | 1 | | 7 | | | | 7 |
| 11 | (United Kingdom) (9) Robert Lambert | | | m | | 0 | | | | | | 1 | | | | | 2 | | 3 | | | 6 | | | | 6 |
| 12 | (Slovakia) (8) Martin Vaculík | | 2 | | | | | | 0 | | | 0 | | | 0 | | | 3 | | | | 5 | | | | 5 |
| 13 | (Poland) (1) Maciej Janowski | 1 | | | | 1 | | | | 0 | | | | 2 | | | | 1 | | | | 5 | | | | 4 |
| 14 | (Poland) (16) Krzysztof Kasprzak | | | | 0 | | | | 1 | 1 | | | | | | 0 | | | 2 | | | 4 | | | | 3 |
| 15 | (Denmark) (12) Anders Thomsen | | | 1 | | | | | 2 | | 0 | | | 0 | | | | | | 0 | | 3 | | | | 2 |
| 16 | (Sweden) (7) Oliver Berntzon | | 0 | | | | | 0 | | | | | 0 | 1 | | | | | 0 | | | 1 | | | | 1 |
| R1 | (Poland) (R1) Wiktor Lampart | | | 0 | | | | | | | | | | | | | | | | | | 0 | R1 | | | |
| R2 | (Poland) (R2) Mateusz Świdnicki | | | | | | | | | | | | | | | | | | | | | 0 | R2 | | | |

m - exclusion for exceeding two minute time allowance • t - exclusion for touching the tapes • x - other exclusion • e - retired or mechanical failure • f - fell • ns - non-starter • nc - non-classify

| gate A - inside | gate B | gate C | gate D - outside |

=== Event 4 - Orlen Lublin Grand Prix (7 August) ===
| Placing | Rider | 1 | 2 | 3 | 4 | 5 | 6 | 7 | 8 | 9 | 10 | 11 | 12 | 13 | 14 | 15 | 16 | 17 | 18 | 19 | 20 | Pts | SF1 | SF2 | Final | GP Pts |
|---|---|---|---|---|---|---|---|---|---|---|---|---|---|---|---|---|---|---|---|---|---|---|---|---|---|---|
| 1 | (Russia) (13) Artem Laguta | | | | 3 | 3 | | | | | | | 3 | | 1 | | | | | 3 | | 13 | | 3 | 3 | 20 |
| 2 | (Poland) (8) Bartosz Zmarzlik | | 3 | | | | | | 3 | | | 2 | | | 3 | | | 3 | | | | 14 | 3 | | 2 | 18 |
| 3 | (Poland) (12) Dominik Kubera | | | 3 | | | | | 0 | | 3 | | | 3 | | | | | | 1 | | 10 | | 2 | 1 | 16 |
| 4 | (Sweden) (4) Freddie Lindgren | 3 | | | | | | | 2 | | | | 2 | | | | x | | | | 3 | 10 | 2 | | 0 | 14 |
| 5 | (Russia) (2) Emil Sayfutdinov | 2 | | | | | 2 | | | | 2 | | | | 2 | | | | 1 | | | 9 | 1 | | | 12 |
| 6 | (Australia) (14) Max Fricke | | | | 1 | | 0 | | | | | 3 | | 1 | | | | | | | 2 | 7 | | 1 | | 11 |
| 7 | (United Kingdom) (15) Tai Woffinden | | | | 2 | | | 3 | | | 0 | | | | | | 3 | 1 | | | | 9 | | 0 | | 10 |
| 8 | (Denmark) (3) Anders Thomsen | 1 | | | | | | 2 | | | | 1 | | | | 2 | | | | 2 | | 8 | 0 | | | 9 |
| 9 | (United Kingdom) (5) Robert Lambert | | 2 | | | 1 | | | | | 1 | | | | | 3 | | | | | 0 | 7 | | | | 8 |
| 10 | (Australia) (7) Jason Doyle | | 0 | | | | | 0 | | | | | 1 | 2 | | | | | 3 | | | 6 | | | | 7 |
| 11 | (Slovakia) (10) Martin Vaculík | | | 2 | | | 3 | | | | | | ns | | | ns | | ns | | | | 5 | | | | 6 |
| 12 | (Denmark) (16) Leon Madsen | | | | 0 | | | | 1 | 3 | | | | | | 1 | | | 0 | | | 5 | | | | 5 |
| 13 | (Slovenia) (11) Matej Žagar | | | 1 | | | | 1 | | 2 | | | | | 0 | | | | | | 1 | 5 | | | | 4 |
| 14 | (Poland) (1) Krzysztof Kasprzak | 0 | | | | 2 | | | | 1 | | | | 0 | | | | 2 | | | | 5 | | | | 3 |
| 15 | (Poland) (6) Maciej Janowski | | 1 | | | | 1 | | | 0 | | | | | | | 2 | | | 0 | | 4 | | | | 2 |
| 16 | (Sweden) (9) Oliver Berntzon | | | 0 | | 0 | | | | | | 0 | | | | | 1 | | 2 | | | 3 | | | | 1 |
| R1 | (Poland) (R1) Wiktor Lampart | | | | | | | | | | | | t | | | 0 | | | | | | 0 | R1 | | | |
| R2 | (Poland) (R2) Mateusz Świdnicki | | | | | | | | | | | | 0 | | | | | 0 | | | | 0 | R2 | | | |

m - exclusion for exceeding two minute time allowance • t - exclusion for touching the tapes • x - other exclusion • e - retired or mechanical failure • f - fell • ns - non-starter • nc - non-classify

| gate A - inside | gate B | gate C | gate D - outside |

=== Event 5 - eWinner Toruń Grand Prix (1 October) ===
| Placing | Rider | 1 | 2 | 3 | 4 | 5 | 6 | 7 | 8 | 9 | 10 | 11 | 12 | 13 | 14 | 15 | 16 | 17 | 18 | 19 | 20 | Pts | SF1 | SF2 | Final | GP Pts |
|---|---|---|---|---|---|---|---|---|---|---|---|---|---|---|---|---|---|---|---|---|---|---|---|---|---|---|
| 1 | (Russia) (5) Artem Laguta | | 3 | | | 1 | | | | | 3 | | | | | 2 | | | | | 3 | 12 | | 3 | 3 | 20 |
| 2 | (Poland) (3) Maciej Janowski | 1 | | | | | | 2 | | | | 3 | | | | 0 | | | | 3 | | 9 | 2 | | 2 | 18 |
| 3 | (United Kingdom) (10) Tai Woffinden | | | 3 | | | 3 | | | | | | 3 | | | 3 | | 0 | | | | 12 | 3 | | 1 | 16 |
| 4 | (Denmark) (8) Leon Madsen | | 1 | | | | | | 2 | | | 2 | | | 3 | | | 3 | | | | 11 | | 2 | 0 | 14 |
| 5 | (Poland) (12) Bartosz Zmarzlik | | | 2 | | | | | 3 | | 2 | | | 3 | | | | | | 1 | | 11 | 1 | | | 12 |
| 6 | (United Kingdom) (1) Robert Lambert | 3 | | | | 2 | | | | t | | | | 1 | | | | 2 | | | | 8 | | 1 | | 11 |
| 7 | (Russia) (15) Emil Sayfutdinov | | | | 3 | | | 3 | | | 1 | | | | | | 3 | 1 | | | | 11 | | 0 | | 10 |
| 8 | (Australia) (6) Max Fricke | | 2 | | | | 2 | | | 3 | | | | | | | 2 | | | 2 | | 11 | 0 | | | 9 |
| 9 | (Sweden) (7) Oliver Berntzon | | 0 | | | | | 1 | | | | | 2 | 0 | | | | | 3 | | | 6 | | | | 8 |
| 10 | (Poland) (13) Paweł Przedpełski | | | | 0 | 3 | | | | | | | 1 | | 2 | | | | | 0 | | 6 | | | | 7 |
| 11 | (Poland) (14) Krzysztof Kasprzak | | | | 2 | | 1 | | | | | 0 | | 2 | | | | | | | 1 | 6 | | | | 6 |
| 12 | (Denmark) (16) Anders Thomsen | | | | 1 | | | | 1 | 2 | | | | | | 1 | | | 2 | | | 7 | | | | 5 |
| 13 | (Australia) (11) Jason Doyle | | | 1 | | | | x | | 1 | | | | | 1 | | | | | | 2 | 5 | | | | 4 |
| 14 | (Sweden) (9) Freddie Lindgren | | | 1 | | 0 | | | | | | 1 | | | | | x | | 1 | | | 3 | | | | 3 |
| 15 | (Slovenia) (2) Matej Žagar | 2 | | | | | 0 | | | | 0 | | | | e | | | | 0 | | | 2 | | | | 2 |
| 16 | (Slovakia) (4) Martin Vaculík | 0 | | | | | | | e | | | | ns | | | | ns | | | | ns | 0 | | | | 1 |
| R1 | (Poland) (R1) Krzysztof Lewandowski | | | | | | | | | 0 | | | | | | | t | | | | 0 | 0 | R1 | | | |
| R2 | (Poland) (R2) Karol Żupiński | | | | | | | | | | | | 1 | | | | 1 | | | | | 2 | R2 | | | |

m - exclusion for exceeding two minute time allowance • t - exclusion for touching the tapes • x - other exclusion • e - retired or mechanical failure • f - fell • ns - non-starter • nc - non-classify

| gate A - inside | gate B | gate C | gate D - outside |

=== Event 6 - eWinner Toruń Grand Prix (2 October) ===
| Placing | Rider | 1 | 2 | 3 | 4 | 5 | 6 | 7 | 8 | 9 | 10 | 11 | 12 | 13 | 14 | 15 | 16 | 17 | 18 | 19 | 20 | Pts | SF1 | SF2 | Final | GP Pts |
|---|---|---|---|---|---|---|---|---|---|---|---|---|---|---|---|---|---|---|---|---|---|---|---|---|---|---|
| 1 | (Poland) (16) Bartosz Zmarzlik | | | | 3 | | | | 2 | 2 | | | | | | 3 | | | 3 | | | 13 | 2 | | 3 | 20 |
| 2 | (Russia) (2) Emil Sayfutdinov | 3 | | | | | 3 | | | | 2 | | | | 3 | | | | 1 | | | 12 | | 2 | 2 | 18 |
| 3 | (Poland) (9) Maciej Janowski | | | 1 | | 3 | | | | | | 3 | | | | | 3 | | 2 | | | 12 | | 3 | 1 | 16 |
| 4 | (Russia) (1) Artem Laguta | 2 | | | | 1 | | | | 0 | | | | 3 | | | | 3 | | | | 9 | 3 | | 0 | 14 |
| 5 | (Denmark) (11) Leon Madsen | | | 3 | | | | 3 | | 3 | | | | | 1 | | | | | | 0 | 10 | 1 | | | 12 |
| 6 | (United Kingdom) (7) Robert Lambert | | 3 | | | | | 2 | | | | | 3 | 2 | | | | | 0 | | | 10 | | 1 | | 11 |
| 7 | (United Kingdom) (5) Tai Woffinden | | 2 | | | 0 | | | | | 3 | | | | | 2 | | | | | 2 | 9 | 0 | | | 10 |
| 8 | (Australia) (14) Jason Doyle | | | | 2 | | 2 | | | | | 1 | | 1 | | | | | | | 3 | 9 | | 0 | | 9 |
| 9 | (Australia) (13) Max Fricke | | | | 0 | 2 | | | | | | | 2 | | 0 | | | | | 3 | | 7 | | | | 8 |
| 10 | (Sweden) (8) Freddie Lindgren | | 0 | | | | | | e | | | 2 | | | 2 | | | 2 | | | | 6 | | | | 7 |
| 11 | (Poland) (12) Paweł Przedpełski | | | 0 | | | | | 3 | | 1 | | | 0 | | | | | | 1 | | 5 | | | | 6 |
| 12 | (Denmark) (4) Anders Thomsen | 0 | | | | | | | 1 | | | | 1 | | | | 2 | | | | 1 | 5 | | | | 5 |
| 13 | (Sweden) (10) Oliver Berntzon | | | 2 | | | 1 | | | | | | 0 | | | 1 | | 0 | | | | 4 | | | | 4 |
| 14 | (Poland) (3) Krzysztof Kasprzak | 1 | | | | | | 1 | | | | 0 | | | | 0 | | | | 2 | | 4 | | | | 3 |
| 15 | (Slovenia) (15) Matej Žagar | | | | 1 | | | 0 | | | 0 | | | | | | 1 | 1 | | | | 3 | | | | 2 |
| 16 | (Australia) (6) Jaimon Lidsey | | 0 | | | | 0 | | | 1 | | | | | | | 0 | | | 0 | | 1 | | | | 1 |
| R1 | (Poland) (R1) Krzysztof Lewandowski | | | | | | | | | | | | | | | | | | | | | 0 | R1 | | | |
| R2 | (Poland) (R2) Karol Żupiński | | | | | | | | | | | | | | | | | | | | | 0 | R2 | | | |

m - exclusion for exceeding two minute time allowance • t - exclusion for touching the tapes • x - other exclusion • e - retired or mechanical failure • f - fell • ns - non-starter • nc - non-classify

| gate A - inside | gate B | gate C | gate D - outside |
