= Speedway Grand Prix of Poland =

World speedway event

FIM Speedway Grand Prix of Poland
- Stadium: 1 Stadion Narodowy, Warsaw; 2 Edward Jancarz Stadium, Gorzów; 3 Olympic Stadium, Wrocław
- Years: 30 (67 grand prix) (1995-present)
- Track: Speedway track
- Track Length: 278, 329, 387 m

Last Event (season 2025)
- Date: 30 August 2025
- Winner: (Australia) Brady Kurtz

The Speedway Grand Prix of Poland is a motorcycle speedway event that is a part of the Speedway Grand Prix series (world championship).

== History ==
From 1995 until 2009 the Grand Prix of Poland was only held once every year, primarily at the Polonia Stadium. However, with the boom of popularity of speedway in Poland and the investment in stadia in the country it was decided in 2010 that two events would be included in the world championship series. The two events were usually held at the Edward Jancarz Stadium and the MotoArena Toruń.

In 2015, the number of Polish Grand Prix rounds in the world championship increased to three, based largely on the fact that the sport's popularity in Poland was still at peak and most of the world's best riders were based in Poland. Not including the COVID-19 pandemic affected years, the world championship contained four events in Poland during 2022 and 2024.

== Winners ==
	Season	City	Stadium	Winner
1	1995	Wrocław	Olympic Stadium	(Poland) Tomasz Gollob	result
2	1996	Wrocław	Olympic Stadium	(Denmark) Tommy Knudsen	result
3	1997	Wrocław	Olympic Stadium	(United States) Greg Hancock	result
4	1998	Bydgoszcz	Polonia Stadium	(Poland) Tomasz Gollob	result
5	1999	Wrocław	Olympic Stadium	(Poland) Tomasz Gollob	result
6	1999	Bydgoszcz	Polonia Stadium	(Denmark) Hans Nielsen	result
7	2000	Wrocław	Olympic Stadium	(Sweden) Tony Rickardsson	result
8	2001	Bydgoszcz	Polonia Stadium	(Australia) Jason Crump	result
9	2002	Bydgoszcz	Polonia Stadium	(Poland) Tomasz Gollob	result
10	2003	Bydgoszcz	Polonia Stadium	(Poland) Tomasz Gollob	result
11	2004	Bydgoszcz	Polonia Stadium	(Poland) Tomasz Gollob	result
12	2005	Bydgoszcz	Polonia Stadium	(Poland) Tomasz Gollob	result
13	2006	Bydgoszcz	Polonia Stadium	(Denmark) Nicki Pedersen	result
14	2007	Bydgoszcz	Polonia Stadium	(Poland) Tomasz Gollob	result
15	2008	Bydgoszcz	Polonia Stadium	(United States) Greg Hancock	result
16	2009	Bydgoszcz	Polonia Stadium	(Denmark) Nicki Pedersen	result
17	2010	Toruń	MotoArena Toruń	(Poland) Tomasz Gollob	result
18	2010	Bydgoszcz	Polonia Stadium	(Sweden) Andreas Jonsson	result
19	2011	Toruń	MotoArena Toruń	(Sweden) Andreas Jonsson	result
20	2011	Gorzów	Jancarz Stadium	(United States) Greg Hancock	result
21	2012	Gorzów	Jancarz Stadium	(Slovakia) Martin Vaculík	result
22	2012	Toruń	MotoArena Toruń	(Sweden) Antonio Lindbäck	result
23	2013	Gorzów	Jancarz Stadium	(Poland) Jaroslaw Hampel	result
24	2013	Toruń	MotoArena Toruń	(Poland) Adrian Miedziński	result
25	2014	Gorzów	Jancarz Stadium	(Poland) Bartosz Zmarzlik	result
26	2014	Toruń	MotoArena Toruń	(Poland) Krzysztof Kasprzak	result
27	2015	Warsaw	Stadion Narodowy	(Slovenia) Matej Žagar	result
28	2015	Gorzów	Jancarz Stadium	(Slovenia) Matej Žagar	result
29	2015	Toruń	MotoArena Toruń	(Denmark) Nicki Pedersen	result
30	2016	Warsaw	Stadion Narodowy	(England) Tai Woffinden	result
31	2016	Gorzów	Jancarz Stadium	(Australia) Jason Doyle	result
32	2016	Toruń	MotoArena Toruń	(Denmark) Niels-Kristian Iversen	result
33	2017	Warsaw	Stadion Narodowy	(Sweden) Fredrik Lindgren	result
34	2017	Gorzów	Jancarz Stadium	(England) Tai Woffinden	result
35	2017	Toruń	MotoArena Toruń	(Poland) Patryk Dudek	result
36	2018	Warsaw	Stadion Narodowy	(England) Tai Woffinden	result
37	2018	Gorzów	Jancarz Stadium	(Slovakia) Martin Vaculík	result
38	2018	Toruń	MotoArena Toruń	(England) Tai Woffinden	result
39	2019	Warsaw	Stadion Narodowy	(Denmark) Leon Madsen	result
40	2019	Wrocław	Olympic Stadium	(Poland) Bartosz Zmarzlik	result
41	2019	Toruń	MotoArena Toruń	(Denmark) Leon Madsen	result
42	2020	Wrocław	Olympic Stadium	(Russia) Artem Laguta	result
43	2020	Wrocław	Olympic Stadium	(Poland) Maciej Janowski	result
44	2020	Gorzów	Jancarz Stadium	(Poland) Bartosz Zmarzlik	result
45	2020	Gorzów	Jancarz Stadium	(Sweden) Freddie Lindgren	result
46	2020	Toruń	MotoArena Toruń	(Australia) Max Fricke	result
47	2020	Toruń	MotoArena Toruń	(Poland) Bartosz Zmarzlik	result
48	2021	Wrocław	Olympic Stadium	(Poland) Bartosz Zmarzlik	result
49	2021	Wrocław	Olympic Stadium	(Poland) Bartosz Zmarzlik	result
50	2021	Lublin	Stadion MOSiR	(Poland) Bartosz Zmarzlik	result
51	2021	Lublin	Stadion MOSiR	(Russia) Artem Laguta	result
52	2021	Toruń	MotoArena Toruń	(Russia) Artem Laguta	result
53	2021	Toruń	MotoArena Toruń	(Poland) Bartosz Zmarzlik	result
54	2022	Warsaw	Stadion Narodowy	(Australia) Max Fricke	result
55	2022	Gorzów	Jancarz Stadium	(Denmark) Anders Thomsen	result
56	2022	Wrocław	Olympic Stadium	(England) Dan Bewley	result
57	2022	Toruń	MotoArena Toruń	(Slovakia) Martin Vaculík	result
58	2023	Warsaw	Stadion Narodowy	(Sweden) Freddie Lindgren	result
59	2023	Gorzów	Jancarz Stadium	(Poland) Bartosz Zmarzlik	result
60	2023	Toruń	MotoArena Toruń	(Poland) Bartosz Zmarzlik	result
61	2024	Warsaw	Stadion Narodowy	(Australia) Jason Doyle	result
62	2024	Gorzów	Jancarz Stadium	(Sweden) Freddie Lindgren	result
63	2024	Wrocław	Olympic Stadium	(Slovakia) Martin Vaculík	result
64	2024	Toruń	MotoArena Toruń	(Poland) Bartosz Zmarzlik	result
65	2025	Warsaw	Stadion Narodowy	(Australia) Jack Holder	result
66	2025	Gorzów	Jancarz Stadium	(Australia) Brady Kurtz	result
67	2025	Wrocław	Olympic Stadium	(Australia) Brady Kurtz	result

== Most wins ==
- (Poland) Bartosz Zmarzlik 11 times
- (Poland) Tomasz Gollob 9 times
