= 2021 Speedway Grand Prix of Russia =

Speedway Grand Prix event

- Venue: Anatoly Stepanov Stadium
- Location: Tolyatti (Russia)
- Start date: 28 August 2021
- Competitors: 16 (2 reserves)

The 2021 FIM Speedway Grand Prix of Russia was the eighth round of the 2021 Speedway Grand Prix season (the World Championship of speedway). It took place on 28 August at the Anatoly Stepanov Stadium in Tolyatti, Russia. It was the inaugural Speedway Grand Prix of Russia.

The event was won by Artem Laguta (his 4th career Grand Prix win).

== Grand Prix result ==
Placing	Rider	1	2	3	4	5	6	7	8	9	10	11	12	13	14	15	16	17	18	19	20	Pts	SF1	SF2	Final	GP Pts
1	(Russia) (10) Artem Laguta			3			3						3			2		3				14	2		3	20
2	(Poland) (11) Bartosz Zmarzlik			1				3		3					2						3	12		3	2	18
3	(Denmark) (2) Anders Thomsen	2					2				2				1				3			10		2	1	16
4	(Russia) (7) Emil Sayfutdinov		3					0					2	2					1			8	3		0	14
5	(Sweden) (5) Freddie Lindgren		0			2					3					3					1	9	1			12
6	(Australia) (4) Max Fricke	3							2				1				2				0	8		1		11
7	(Denmark) (12) Leon Madsen			2					1		1			3						3		10	0			10
8	(United Kingdom) (8) Tai Woffinden		2						3			3			3			2				13		f		9
9	(Poland) (6) Maciej Janowski		1				x			2							3			2		8				8
10	(Australia) (13) Jason Doyle				3	3							f		0					1		7				7
11	(Ukraine) (14) Aleksandr Loktaev				1		1					2		0							2	6				6
12	(Slovenia) (15) Matej Žagar				2			2			0						0	0				4				5
13	(Russia) (16) Vadim Tarasenko				f				0	1						0			2			3				4
14	(Sweden) (3) Oliver Berntzon	0						1				1				1				0		3				3
15	(Poland) (1) Krzysztof Kasprzak	1				0				t				1				1				3				2
16	(United Kingdom) (9) Robert Lambert			0		1						0					1		0			2				1
R1	(Russia) (R1) Renat Gafurov									0												0	R1			
R2	(Russia) (R2) Evgeny Saidullin																					0	R2			

m - exclusion for exceeding two minute time allowance • t - exclusion for touching the tapes • x - other exclusion • e - retired or mechanical failure • f - fell • ns - non-starter • nc - non-classify

gate A - inside	gate B	gate C	gate D - outside
