= 2021 Speedway Grand Prix of Sweden =

Speedway Grand Prix event

2021 Speedway Grand Prix of Denmark
- Venue: Skrotfrag Arena
- Location: Målilla (Sweden)
- Start date: 14 August 2021
- Competitors: 16 (2 reserves)

The 2021 FIM Speedway Grand Prix of Sweden was the seventh round of the 2021 Speedway Grand Prix season (the World Championship of speedway). It took place on 14 August at the Skrotfrag Arena in Målilla, Sweden. It was the 26th Speedway Grand Prix of Sweden.

The event was won by Bartosz Zmarzlik (his 14th career Grand Prix win).

== Grand Prix result ==
Placing	Rider	1	2	3	4	5	6	7	8	9	10	11	12	13	14	15	16	17	18	19	20	Pts	SF1	SF2	Final	GP Pts
1	(Poland) (13) Bartosz Zmarzlik				0	3							1		1					3		8	3		3	20
2	(Russia) (7) Artem Laguta		2					3					3	3					3			14	2		2	18
3	(Sweden) (10) Freddie Lindgren			3			3						2			3		2				13		2	1	16
4	(Australia) (11) Jason Doyle			2				2		3					3						2	12		3	t	14
5	(Russia) (14) Emil Sayfutdinov				1		2					3		2							1	9	1			12
6	(Poland) (8) Maciej Janowski		1						1			2			2			3				9		1		11
7	(Poland) (2) Dominik Kubera	3					0				2				0				2			7	0			10
8	(Denmark) (16) Anders Thomsen				3				2	2						0			0			7		0		9
9	(United Kingdom) (5) Tai Woffinden		3			1					1					2					0	7				8
10	(Australia) (12) Max Fricke			1					3		0			1						2		7				7
11	(United Kingdom) (15) Robert Lambert				2			0			3						e	0				5				6
12	(Sweden) (1) Oliver Berntzon	1				2				1				0				1				5				5
13	(Slovenia) (9) Matej Žagar			0		0						0					3		1			4				4
14	(Denmark) (4) Leon Madsen	e							0				0				1				3	4				3
15	(Poland) (6) Krzysztof Kasprzak		0				1			0							2			1		4				2
16	(Sweden) (3) Pontus Aspgren	2						1				1				t				0		4				1
R1	(Sweden) (R1) Kim Nilsson															1						1	R1			
R2	(Sweden) (R2) Joel Andersson																					0	R2			

m - exclusion for exceeding two minute time allowance • t - exclusion for touching the tapes • x - other exclusion • e - retired or mechanical failure • f - fell • ns - non-starter • nc - non-classify

gate A - inside	gate B	gate C	gate D - outside
