= 2020 Speedway Grand Prix of Poland =

Speedway Grand Prix event

- Venue: Olympic Stadium; Edward Jancarz Stadium; MotoArena Toruń
- Location: Wrocław; Gorzów; Toruń
- Start date: 28/29 August; 11/12 September; 2/3 October
- Competitors: 16 (2 reserves)

The 2020 FIM Speedway Grand Prix of Poland was the first, second, third, fourth, seventh and eighth rounds of the 2020 Speedway Grand Prix season (the World Championship). The calendar of events was severely disrupted by the effects of the COVID-19 pandemic and therefore Poland held six rounds of the eight rounds of the 2020 World Championship. With the exception of the Czech Republic, all of the scheduled rounds to be held in other countries were cancelled.

The first two rounds took place on 28 & 29 August 2020 at the Olympic Stadium in Wrocław. The third and fourth rounds were held on 11 and 12 September at the Edward Jancarz Stadium in Gorzów Wielkopolski and finally the last two rounds were held on 2 & 3 October MotoArena Toruń in Toruń.

The rounds were the 42nd to 47th Speedway Grand Prix of Poland.

The rounds were won by Artem Laguta (his maiden career Grand Prix win), Maciej Janowski (his 7th career Grand Prix win), Freddie Lindgren (his 5th career Grand Prix win), Max Fricke (his maiden career Grand Prix win), and two by Bartosz Zmarzlik (his 7th and 10th career Grand Prix wins).

In the final round at Toruń, Tai Woffinden defeated Freddie Lindgren in a race-off for the silver medal.

== Results ==
=== Event 1 (28 August) ===
Placing	Rider	1	2	3	4	5	6	7	8	9	10	11	12	13	14	15	16	17	18	19	20	Pts	SF1	SF2	Final	GP Pts
1	(Russia) (3) Artem Laguta	3						3				3				3				2		14	3		3	20
2	(Poland) (12) Maciej Janowski			3					2		1			3						3		12		3	2	18
3	(Sweden) (16) Freddie Lindgren				1				1	3						2			x			7		2	1	16
4	(United Kingdom) (2) Tai Woffinden	2					3				2				2				1			10	2		0	14
5	(Denmark) (8) Leon Madsen		3						3			2			1			3				12		1		12
6	(Poland) (9) Bartosz Zmarzlik			2		3						0					2		3			10	1			11
7	(Russia) (15) Emil Sayfutdinov				3			2			3						3	0				11	0			10
8	(Slovakia) (13) Martin Vaculík				2	2							3		3					1		11		0		9
9	(Slovenia) (7) Matej Žagar		2					0					1	1					2			6				8
10	(Poland) (14) Gleb Chugunov				t		2					1		2							1	6				7
11	(Australia) (11) Jason Doyle			0				1		1					0						3	5				6
12	(Poland) (10) Patryk Dudek			1			0						2			0		2				5				5
13	(Denmark) (5) Mikkel Michelsen		1			1					0					1					2	5				4
14	(Denmark) (1) Niels-Kristian Iversen	0				0				2				0				1				3				3
15	(Australia) (6) Max Fricke		0				1			0							1			0		2				2
16	(Sweden) (4) Antonio Lindbäck	1							0				0				0				0	1				1
R1	(Poland) (R1) Przemysław Liszka				t																	0	R1			
R2	(Poland) (R2) Michał Curzytek				0																	0	R2			

m - exclusion for exceeding two minute time allowance • t - exclusion for touching the tapes • x - other exclusion • e - retired or mechanical failure • f - fell • ns - non-starter • nc - non-classify

gate A - inside	gate B	gate C	gate D - outside

=== Event 2 (29 August) ===
Placing	Rider	1	2	3	4	5	6	7	8	9	10	11	12	13	14	15	16	17	18	19	20	Pts	SF1	SF2	Final	GP Pts
1	(Poland) (1) Maciej Janowski	3				3				1				3				3				13	3		3	20
2	(United Kingdom) (16) Tai Woffinden				1				2	2						3			2			10		3	2	18
3	(Poland) (9) Bartosz Zmarzlik			1		1						3					3		3			11		2	1	16
4	(Sweden) (10) Freddie Lindgren			3			3						2			1		0				9	2		0	14
5	(Russia) (13) Artem Laguta				3	0							3		3					3		12		1		12
6	(Denmark) (6) Niels-Kristian Iversen		1				2			3							2			2		10	1			11
7	(Australia) (8) Max Fricke		0						3			2			1			2				8	0			10
8	(Poland) (5) Gleb Chugunov		2			2					2					2					x	8		0		9
9	(Poland) (11) Patryk Dudek			2				3		0					0						2	7				8
10	(Denmark) (7) Mikkel Michelsen		3					2					0	2					0			7				7
11	(Denmark) (2) Leon Madsen	0					1				3				2				1			7				6
12	(Russia) (14) Emil Sayfutdinov				2		0					1		0							3	6				5
13	(Slovenia) (15) Matej Žagar				0			1			1						1	1				4				4
14	(Slovakia) (4) Martin Vaculík	1							1				1				0				1	4				3
15	(Australia) (3) Jason Doyle	2						0				0				0				1		3				2
16	(Sweden) (12) Antonio Lindbäck			0					0		0			1						0		1				1
R1	(Poland) (R1) Przemysław Liszka																					0	R1			
R2	(Poland) (R2) Michał Curzytek																					0	R2			

m - exclusion for exceeding two minute time allowance • t - exclusion for touching the tapes • x - other exclusion • e - retired or mechanical failure • f - fell • ns - non-starter • nc - non-classify

gate A - inside	gate B	gate C	gate D - outside

=== Event 3 (11 September) ===
Placing	Rider	1	2	3	4	5	6	7	8	9	10	11	12	13	14	15	16	17	18	19	20	Pts	SF1	SF2	Final	GP Pts
1	(Poland) (13) Bartosz Zmarzlik				3	3							3		3					2		14	3		3	20
2	(Australia) (5) Jason Doyle		0			2					1					3					2	8	2		2	18
3	(Sweden) (16) Freddie Lindgren				2				3	3						2			1			11		2	1	16
4	(Denmark) (11) Leon Madsen			2				3		0					1						3	9		3	0	14
5	(Slovakia) (7) Martin Vaculík		3					2					2	3					2			12		1		12
6	(United Kingdom) (12) Tai Woffinden			1					2		3			2						3		11	1			11
7	(Poland) (8) Maciej Janowski		2						0			3			0			3				8	0			10
8	(Slovenia) (2) Matej Žagar	2					2				2				2				0			8		0		9
9	(Russia) (9) Artem Laguta			0		0						2					2		3			7				8
10	(Russia) (4) Emil Sayfutdinov	0							1				1				3				1	6				7
11	(Denmark) (6) Niels-Kristian Iversen		1				1			2							1			1		6				6
12	(Denmark) (10) Mikkel Michelsen			3			0						0			0		2				5				5
13	(Australia) (14) Max Fricke				1		3					0		0							0	4				4
14	(Denmark) (1) Anders Thomsen	1				1				1				1				0				4				3
15	(Poland) (3) Patryk Dudek	3						0				ns				ns				ns		3				2
16	(Sweden) (15) Antonio Lindbäck				0			1			0						0	1				2				1
R1	(Poland) (R1) Rafał Karczmarz											t				1						1	R1			
R2	(Poland) (R2) Wiktor Jasiński											1								0		1	R2			

m - exclusion for exceeding two minute time allowance • t - exclusion for touching the tapes • x - other exclusion • e - retired or mechanical failure • f - fell • ns - non-starter • nc - non-classify

gate A - inside	gate B	gate C	gate D - outside

=== Event 4 (12 September) ===
Placing	Rider	1	2	3	4	5	6	7	8	9	10	11	12	13	14	15	16	17	18	19	20	Pts	SF1	SF2	Final	GP Pts
1	(Sweden) (11) Freddie Lindgren			2				3		3					2						2	12		2	3	20
2	(Denmark) (1) Leon Madsen	3				2				0				3				3				11	2		2	18
3	(Australia) (2) Jason Doyle	2					3				2				3				2			12		3	1	16
4	(Russia) (5) Emil Sayfutdinov		1			0					3					3					3	10	3		0	14
5	(Poland) (9) Bartosz Zmarzlik			3		3						3					3		1			13	1			12
6	(Slovakia) (6) Martin Vaculík		3				2			2							1			3		11		1		11
7	(United Kingdom) (16) Tai Woffinden				3				2	1						2			3			11	0			10
8	(Poland) (8) Maciej Janowski		2						3			2			0			2				9		0		9
9	(Australia) (13) Max Fricke				2	1							2		1					2		8				8
10	(Denmark) (10) Anders Thomsen			0			1						3			1		1				6				7
11	(Slovenia) (12) Matej Žagar			1					1		1			1						1		5				6
12	(Russia) (3) Artem Laguta	1						2				0				0				0		3				5
13	(Denmark) (15) Niels-Kristian Iversen				0			1			0						2	0				3				4
14	(Sweden) (7) Antonio Lindbäck		e					0					1	2					0			3				3
15	(Denmark) (14) Mikkel Michelsen				1		0					1		e							0	2				2
16	(Poland) (4) Patryk Dudek	t							0				0				0				1	1				1
R1	(Poland) (R1) Rafał Karczmarz	0																				0	R1			
R2	(Poland) (R2) Wiktor Jasiński																					0	R2			

m - exclusion for exceeding two minute time allowance • t - exclusion for touching the tapes • x - other exclusion • e - retired or mechanical failure • f - fell • ns - non-starter • nc - non-classify

gate A - inside	gate B	gate C	gate D - outside

=== Event 5 (2 October) ===
Placing	Rider	1	2	3	4	5	6	7	8	9	10	11	12	13	14	15	16	17	18	19	20	Pts	SF1	SF2	Final	GP Pts
1	(Australia) (1) Max Fricke	3				1				2				1				3				10	3		3	20
2	(Poland) (15) Maciej Janowski				3			2			3						2	2				12	2		2	18
3	(United Kingdom) (13) Tai Woffinden				0	3							3		1					3		10		2	1	16
4	(Poland) (9) Bartosz Zmarzlik			3		f						2					1		3			9		3	0	14
5	(Russia) (8) Emil Sayfutdinov		0						3			3			3			1				10		1		12
6	(Sweden) (16) Freddie Lindgren				2				2	3						2			1			10	1			11
7	(Slovakia) (4) Martin Vaculík	2							1				1				3				3	10		0		10
8	(Denmark) (7) Leon Madsen		1					3					2	3					0			9	0			9
9	(Russia) (14) Artem Laguta				1		3					1		2							2	9				8
10	(Australia) (2) Jason Doyle	1					2				2				2				2			9				7
11	(Slovenia) (5) Matej Žagar		3			2					1					1					1	8				6
12	(Australia) (6) Jack Holder		2				1			1							0			2		6				5
13	(Poland) (10) Patryk Dudek			2			0						0			3		0				5				4
14	(Denmark) (3) Mikkel Michelsen	0						1				0				0				1		2				3
15	(Sweden) (12) Antonio Lindbäck			1					0		0			0						0		1				2
16	(Denmark) (11) Niels-Kristian Iversen			0				0		0					0						0	0				1
R1	(Poland) (R1) Viktor Trofimov Jr.																					0	R1			
R2	(Poland) (R2) Igor Kopec-Sobczynski																					0	R2			

m - exclusion for exceeding two minute time allowance • t - exclusion for touching the tapes • x - other exclusion • e - retired or mechanical failure • f - fell • ns - non-starter • nc - non-classify

gate A - inside	gate B	gate C	gate D - outside

=== Event 6 (3 October) ===
Placing	Rider	1	2	3	4	5	6	7	8	9	10	11	12	13	14	15	16	17	18	19	20	Pts	SF1	SF2	Final	GP Pts
1	(Poland) (7) Bartosz Zmarzlik		1					3					2	2					1			9	2		3	20
2	(Poland) (1) Maciej Janowski	3				3				e				3				3				12		3	2	18
3	(Russia) (8) Artem Laguta		0						3			3			3			2				11		2	1	16
4	(Sweden) (5) Freddie Lindgren		3			2					3					2					3	13	3		e	14
5	(United Kingdom) (6) Tai Woffinden		2				3			2							2			2		11	1			12
6	(Australia) (9) Jason Doyle			3		0						2					1		2			8		1		11
7	(Denmark) (16) Leon Madsen				2				1	3						1			3			10	0			10
8	(Russia) (3) Emil Sayfutdinov	1						2				1				3				3		10		f		9
9	(Sweden) (15) Antonio Lindbäck				3			0			0						3	1				7				8
10	(Australia) (11) Jack Holder			1				1		1					2						2	7				7
11	(Poland) (13) Patryk Dudek				0	1							3		1					1		6				6
12	(Slovakia) (12) Martin Vaculík			0					2		2			1						0		5				5
13	(Australia) (10) Max Fricke			2			2						0			0		0				4				4
14	(Slovenia) (4) Matej Žagar	2							e				1				0				f	3				3
15	(Denmark) (14) Mikkel Michelsen				1		f					0		0							1	2				2
16	(Denmark) (2) Niels-Kristian Iversen	x					1				1				f				ns			2				1
R1	(Poland) (R1) Viktor Trofimov Jr.																		0			0	R1			
R2	(Poland) (R2) Igor Kopec-Sobczynski																					0	R2			

m - exclusion for exceeding two minute time allowance • t - exclusion for touching the tapes • x - other exclusion • e - retired or mechanical failure • f - fell • ns - non-starter • nc - non-classify

gate A - inside	gate B	gate C	gate D - outside
