= 2021 Speedway Grand Prix of Czech Republic =

Speedway Grand Prix event

- Venue: Markéta Stadium
- Location: Prague (Czech Republic)
- Start date: 16 & 18 July 2021
- Competitors: 16 (2 reserves)

The 2021 FIM Anlas Speedway Grand Prix of Czech Republic was the first and second races of the 2021 Speedway Grand Prix season. They took place on 16 & 18 July at the Markéta Stadium in Prague, Czech Republic. The second Grand Prix had been scheduled for 17 July but was abandoned after 11 heats due to bad weather and held the following day. It was the 26th and 27th Speedway Grand Prix of Czech Republic. The calendar of events was disrupted by the effects of the COVID-19 pandemic.

The 26th event was won by Maciej Janowski (his eighth career Grand Prix win) and the 27th event was won by Artem Laguta (his second career Grand prix win).

== Results ==
=== Event 1 (16 July) ===
Placing	Rider	1	2	3	4	5	6	7	8	9	10	11	12	13	14	15	16	17	18	19	20	Pts	SF1	SF2	Final	GP Pts
1	(Poland) (12) Maciej Janowski			3					0		3			2						3		11		3	3	20
2	(Russia) (9) Emil Sayfutdinov			2		3						2					2		3			12	3		2	18
3	(United Kingdom) (14) Tai Woffinden				2		3					0		1							3	9		2	1	16
4	(Sweden) (7) Freddie Lindgren		x					2					3	3					2			10	2		t	14
5	(Russia) (1) Artem Laguta	3				1				3				0				3				10		1		12
6	(Poland) (13) Bartosz Zmarzlik				1	2							2		3					1		9	1			11
7	(Denmark) (15) Leon Madsen				3			3			1						1	1				9	0			10
8	(Australia) (8) Max Fricke		3						1			1			2			2				9		0		9
9	(Slovakia) (3) Martin Vaculík	0						0				3				3				2		8				8
10	(United Kingdom) (16) Robert Lambert				0				3	2						2			0			7				7
11	(Slovenia) (4) Matej Žagar	1							2				1				3				0	7				6
12	(Australia) (2) Jason Doyle	2					t				2				0				1			5				5
13	(Czech Republic) (6) Jan Kvěch		1				2			1							0			0		4				4
14	(Denmark) (11) Anders Thomsen			0				1		0					1						2	4				3
15	(Sweden) (5) Oliver Berntzon		2			0					r					0					1	3				2
16	(Poland) (10) Krzysztof Kasprzak			1			e						0			1		0				2				1
R1	(Czech Republic) (R1) Daniel Klíma						1															1	R1			
R2	(Czech Republic) (R2) Petr Chlupáč																					0	R2			

m - exclusion for exceeding two minute time allowance • t - exclusion for touching the tapes • x - other exclusion • e - retired or mechanical failure • f - fell • ns - non-starter • nc - non-classify

gate A - inside	gate B	gate C	gate D - outside

=== Event 2 (18 July) ===
Placing	Rider	1	2	3	4	5	6	7	8	9	10	11	12	13	14	15	16	17	18	19	20	Pts	SF1	SF2	Final	GP Pts
1	(Russia) (7) Artem Laguta		3					3					1	3					3			13	2		3	20
2	(Poland) (10) Maciej Janowski			3			3						0			1		3				10	3		2	18
3	(Sweden) (2) Freddie Lindgren	2					0				2				2				2			8		2	1	16
4	(Russia) (13) Emil Sayfutdinov				2	3							2		3					1		11		3	0	14
5	(Poland) (12) Bartosz Zmarzlik			2					3		3			2						3		13		1		12
6	(Australia) (16) Jason Doyle				3				1	3						2			1			10	1			11
7	(Slovakia) (3) Martin Vaculík	3						0				2				3				2		10		0		10
8	(Denmark) (4) Anders Thomsen	e							2				3				3				f	8	0			9
9	(United Kingdom) (14) Tai Woffinden				0		2					1		1							3	7				8
10	(Denmark) (8) Leon Madsen		2						t			3			1			1				7				7
11	(Australia) (5) Max Fricke		1			2					1					0					2	6				6
12	(Slovenia) (15) Matej Žagar				1			1			0						1	2				5				5
13	(Poland) (11) Krzysztof Kasprzak			1				2		0					0						1	4				4
14	(Czech Republic) (6) Jan Kvěch		0				1			2							0			0		3				3
15	(United Kingdom) (1) Robert Lambert	1				1				1				0				0				3				2
16	(Sweden) (9) Oliver Berntzon			0		0						0					2		0			2				1
R2	(Czech Republic) (R2) Petr Chlupáč								0													0	R2			
R1	(Czech Republic) (R1) Daniel Klíma																					0	R1			

m - exclusion for exceeding two minute time allowance • t - exclusion for touching the tapes • x - other exclusion • e - retired or mechanical failure • f - fell • ns - non-starter • nc - non-classify

gate A - inside	gate B	gate C	gate D - outside
