= 2021 Speedway Grand Prix of Denmark =

Speedway Grand Prix event

- Venue: Vojens Speedway Center
- Location: Vojens (Denmark)
- Start date: 11 September 2021
- Competitors: 16 (2 reserves)

The 2021 FIM Speedway Grand Prix of Denmark was the ninth round of the 2021 Speedway Grand Prix season (the World Championship of speedway). It took place on 11 September at the Vojens Speedway Center in Vojens, Denmark. It was the 26th Speedway Grand Prix of Denmark.

The event was won by Artem Laguta (his sixth career Grand Prix win).

== Result ==
Placing	Rider	1	2	3	4	5	6	7	8	9	10	11	12	13	14	15	16	17	18	19	20	Pts	SF1	SF2	Final	GP Pts
1	(Russia) (8) Artem Laguta		3						3			3			2			1				12		3	3	20
2	(Poland) (12) Bartosz Zmarzlik			3					2		2			3						3		13	3		2	18
3	(Russia) (5) Emil Sayfutdinov		2			1					3					2					3	11	2		1	16
4	(United Kingdom) (3) Tai Woffinden	2						1				2				3				2		10		2	0	14
5	(United Kingdom) (10) Robert Lambert			2			2						3			1		2				10	1			12
6	(Sweden) (9) Freddie Lindgren			1		2						1					1		3			8		1		11
7	(Denmark) (14) Leon Madsen				3		3					0		1							1	8	0			10
8	(Denmark) (1) Mikkel Michelsen	3				3				0				2				3				11		x		9
9	(Slovakia) (11) Martin Vaculík			0				3		2					e						2	7				8
10	(Australia) (4) Max Fricke	1							1				2				3				0	7				7
11	(Australia) (15) Jason Doyle				2			2			x						2	0				6				6
12	(Slovenia) (6) Matej Žagar		1				0			3							0			1		5				5
13	(Poland) (13) Maciej Janowski				1	0							1		3					0		5				4
14	(Denmark) (2) Anders Thomsen	0					1				1				1				2			5				3
15	(Sweden) (16) Oliver Berntzon				0				0	1						0			0			1				2
16	(Poland) (7) Krzysztof Kasprzak		0					0					e	0					1			1				1
R1	(Denmark) (R1) Frederik Jakobsen																					0	R1			
R2	(Denmark) (R2) Mads Hansen																					0	R2			

m - exclusion for exceeding two minute time allowance • t - exclusion for touching the tapes • x - other exclusion • e - retired or mechanical failure • f - fell • ns - non-starter • nc - non-classify

gate A - inside	gate B	gate C	gate D - outside
