= 2021 Speedway Grand Prix =

Motorcycle speedway world championship

Season details
- Dates: 16 July - 2 October
- Events: 11
- Cities: 7
- Countries: 5
- Riders: 15 permanents 1 wild card(s); 2 track reserves
- Heats: 253 (in 11 events)

Winners
- Champion: (Russia) Artem Laguta
- Runner-up: (Poland) Bartosz Zmarzlik
- 3rd place: (Russia) Emil Sayfutdinov

The 2021 Speedway Grand Prix season was the 27th season of the Speedway Grand Prix era, and decided the 76th FIM Speedway World Championship. The calendar of events was disrupted by the effects of the COVID-19 pandemic and the series was dominated by Polish venues once again, with six of the 11 races taking place in Poland. Great Britain and Germany did not hold an event, however Russia was added to the calendar for the first time. In 2020, six of the eight races had been held in Poland.

Artem Laguta won his first world title. Laguta overtook defending champion Bartosz Zmarzlik in the points standings in round 10, which proved to be the pivotal moment of the championship.

Russian athletes competed as neutral competitors using the designation MFR (Motorcycle Federation of Russia), as the Court of Arbitration for Sport upheld a ban on Russia competing at World Championships. The ban was implemented by the World Anti-Doping Agency in response to state-sponsored doping program of Russian athletes.

== Qualification ==
For the 2021 season there were 15 permanent riders, who were joined at each Grand Prix by one wild card and two track reserves.

The top six riders from the 2020 championship qualified automatically. These riders were joined by the three riders who qualified via the Grand Prix Challenge and the winner of the 2020 Speedway European Championship.

The final four riders were nominated by the SGP Commission following the completion of the 2020 season.

=== Qualified riders ===
#	Riders	2020 place	GP Ch place	Appearance	Previous appearances in series
95	(Poland) Bartosz Zmarzlik	1	—	6th	2012–2015, 2016–2020
108	(England) Tai Woffinden	2	—	10th	2010, 2011, 2013–2020
66	(Sweden) Fredrik Lindgren	3	—	12th	2004, 2006–2007, 2008–2014, 2016, 2017–2020
71	(Poland) Maciej Janowski	4	—	7th	2008, 2012, 2014, 2015–2020
30	(Denmark) Leon Madsen	5	—	3rd	2013, 2019–2020
69	(Australia) Jason Doyle	6	—	7th	2015–2020
222	(Russia) Artem Laguta	7	—	5th	2011, 2018–2020
89	(Russia) Emil Sayfutdinov	8	—	10th	2009–2013, 2017–2020
54	(Slovakia) Martin Vaculík	9	—	6th	2012, 2013, 2017–2020
46	(Australia) Max Fricke	10	—	2nd	2016-2017, 2019, 2020
55	(Slovenia) Matej Žagar	11	1	11th	2003–2005, 2006–2007, 2008–2009, 2011, 2013–2020
93	(Sweden) Oliver Berntzon	—	2	1st	2019
187	(Poland) Krzysztof Kasprzak	—	3	5th	2004–2007, 2008, 2012, 2013–2014
105	(Denmark) Anders Thomsen	—	—	1st	2016, 2020
505	(England) Robert Lambert	—	—	1st	2015, 2018–2019

=== Qualified substitutes ===
The following riders were nominated as substitutes:

#	Riders	2020 place	GP Ch place
575	(Ukraine) Aleksandr Loktaev	—	4
27	(Australia) Jaimon Lidsey	—	—
415	(Poland) Dominik Kubera	—	—
999	(Latvia) Oļegs Mihailovs	—	—
99	(England) Dan Bewley	—	—
125	(Germany) Lukas Fienhage	—	—
201	(Czech Republic) Jan Kvěch	=21	—

== Calendar ==
The 2021 season consisted of 11 events.

Round	Date	City and venue	Winner	Runner-up	3rd placed	4th placed	Results
1	16 July	(Czech Republic) Prague, Czech Republic; Markéta Stadium	(Poland) Maciej Janowski	(Russia) Emil Sayfutdinov	(England) Tai Woffinden	(Sweden) Fredrik Lindgren	results
2	18 July	(Czech Republic) Prague, Czech Republic; Markéta Stadium	(Russia) Artem Laguta	(Poland) Maciej Janowski	(Sweden) Fredrik Lindgren	(Russia) Emil Sayfutdinov	results
3	30 July	(Poland) Wrocław, Poland; Olympic Stadium	(Poland) Bartosz Zmarzlik	(Poland) Maciej Janowski	(Russia) Artem Laguta	(Russia) Emil Sayfutdinov	results
4	31 July	Wrocław, Poland; Olympic Stadium	(Poland) Bartosz Zmarzlik	(Russia) Artem Laguta	(Denmark) Leon Madsen	(England) Tai Woffinden	results
5	6 August	Lublin, Poland; Stadion MOSiR	(Poland) Bartosz Zmarzlik	(Poland) Dominik Kubera	(Sweden) Fredrik Lindgren	(Russia) Artem Laguta	results
6	7 August	Lublin, Poland; Stadion MOSiR	(Russia) Artem Laguta	(Poland) Bartosz Zmarzlik	(Poland) Dominik Kubera	(Sweden) Fredrik Lindgren	results
7	14 August	(Sweden) Målilla, Sweden; Skrotfrag Arena	(Poland) Bartosz Zmarzlik	(Russia) Artem Laguta	(Sweden) Fredrik Lindgren	(Australia) Jason Doyle	results
8	28 August	(Russia) Tolyatti, Russia; Anatoly Stepanov Stadium	(Russia) Artem Laguta	(Poland) Bartosz Zmarzlik	(Denmark) Anders Thomsen	(Russia) Emil Sayfutdinov	results
9	11 September	(Denmark) Vojens, Denmark; Vojens Speedway Center	(Russia) Artem Laguta	(Poland) Bartosz Zmarzlik	(Russia) Emil Sayfutdinov	(England) Tai Woffinden	results
10	1 October	Toruń, Poland; Rose Motoarena	(Russia) Artem Laguta	(Poland) Maciej Janowski	(England) Tai Woffinden	(Denmark) Leon Madsen	results
11	2 October	Toruń, Poland; Rose Motoarena	(Poland) Bartosz Zmarzlik	(Russia) Emil Sayfutdinov	(Poland) Maciej Janowski	(Russia) Artem Laguta	results

== Final Classification ==
Qualifies for next season's Grand Prix series
Full-time Grand Prix rider
Wild card, track reserve or qualified reserve

Pos.	Rider	Points	CZE (Czech Republic)	CZE (Czech Republic)	POL (Poland)	PL2 (Poland)	PL3 (Poland)	PL4 (Poland)	SWE (Sweden)	RUS (Russia)	DEN (Denmark)	PL5 (Poland)	PL6 (Poland)
Gold	(Russia) (222) Artem Laguta	192	12	20	16	18	14	20	18	20	20	20	14
Silver	(Poland) (95) Bartosz Zmarzlik	189	11	12	20	20	20	18	20	18	18	12	20
Bronze	(Russia) (89) Emil Sayfutdinov	149	18	14	14	12	9	12	12	14	16	10	18
4	(Sweden) (66) Fredrik Lindgren	129	14	16	12	8	16	14	16	12	11	3	7
5	(Poland) (71) Maciej Janowski	129	20	18	18	10	4	2	11	8	4	18	16
6	(England) (108) Tai Woffinden	122	16	8	6	14	11	10	8	9	14	16	10
7	(Denmark) (30) Leon Madsen	108	10	7	11	16	10	5	3	10	10	14	12
8	(Australia) (46) Max Fricke	94	9	6	7	11	8	11	7	11	7	9	8
9	(Australia) (69) Jason Doyle	87	5	11	5	7	12	7	14	7	6	4	9
10	(England) (505) Robert Lambert	82	7	2	9	9	6	8	6	1	12	11	11
11	(Denmark) (105) Anders Thomsen	73	3	9	8	4	2	9	9	16	3	5	5
12	(Slovakia) (54) Martin Vaculík	54	8	10	10	6	5	6	–	–	8	1	–
13	(Slovenia) (55) Matej Žagar	45	6	5	4	2	7	3	4	5	5	2	2
14	(Poland) (415) Dominik Kubera	44	–	–	–	–	18	16	10	–	–	–	–
15	(Sweden) (93) Oliver Berntzon	32	2	1	2	3	1	1	5	3	2	8	4
16	(Poland) (187) Krzysztof Kasprzak	28	1	4	1	1	3	4	2	2	1	6	3
17	(Poland) (16) Paweł Przedpełski	13	–	–	–	–	–	–	–	–	–	7	6
18	(Denmark) (16) Mikkel Michelsen	9	–	–	–	–	–	–	–	–	9	–	–
19	(Poland) (16) Gleb Chugunov	8	–	–	3	5	–	–	–	–	–	–	–
20	(Czech Republic) (201) Jan Kvěch	7	4	3	–	–	–	–	–	–	–	–	–
21	(Ukraine) (575) Aleksandr Loktaev	6	–	–	–	–	–	–	–	6	–	–	–
22	(Russia) (16) Vadim Tarasenko	4	–	–	–	–	–	–	–	4	–	–	–
23	(Australia) (27) Jaimon Lidsey	1	–	–	–	–	–	–	–	–	–	–	1
"	(Sweden) (20) Pontus Aspgren	1	–	–	–	–	–	–	1	–	–	–	–
25	(Czech Republic) (17) Daniel Klíma	0	0	0	–	–	–	–	–	–	–	–	–
"	(Czech Republic) (18) Petr Chlupáč	0	0	0	–	–	–	–	–	–	–	–	–
"	(Poland) (17) Tobiasz Musielak	0	–	–	0	0	–	–	–	–	–	–	–
"	(Poland) (18) Bartłomiej Kowalski	0	–	–	0	0	–	–	–	–	–	–	–
"	(Poland) (17) Wiktor Lampart	0	–	–	–	–	0	0	–	–	–	–	–
"	(Poland) (18) Mateusz Świdnicki	0	–	–	–	–	0	0	–	–	–	–	–
"	(Sweden) (17) Kim Nilsson	0	–	–	–	–	–	–	0	–	–	–	–
"	(Sweden) (18) Joel Andersson	0	–	–	–	–	–	–	0	–	–	–	–
"	(Russia) (17) Renat Gafurov	0	–	–	–	–	–	–	–	0	–	–	–
"	(Russia) (18) Evgeny Saidullin	0	–	–	–	–	–	–	–	0	–	–	–
"	(Denmark) (17) Mads Hansen	0	–	–	–	–	–	–	–	–	0	–	–
"	(Denmark) (18) Frederik Jakobsen	0	–	–	–	–	–	–	–	–	0	–	–
"	(Poland) (17) Krzysztof Lewandowski	0	–	–	–	–	–	–	–	–	–	0	0
"	(Poland) (18) Karol Żupiński	0	–	–	–	–	–	–	–	–	–	0	0
Pos.	Rider	Points	CZE (Czech Republic)	CZE (Czech Republic)	POL (Poland)	PL2 (Poland)	PL3 (Poland)	PL4 (Poland)	SWE (Sweden)	RUS (Russia)	DEN (Denmark)	PL5 (Poland)	PL6 (Poland)
