= 2020 Speedway Grand Prix Qualification =

The 2020 Individual Speedway World Championship Grand Prix Qualification was a series of motorcycle speedway meetings used to determine the three riders that qualified for the 2020 Speedway Grand Prix. The series consisted of four qualifying rounds at Glasgow, Žarnovica, Lamothe-Landerron and Abensberg and the Grand Prix Challenge at Goričan. The three riders that qualified were Matej Žagar, Niels-Kristian Iversen and Max Fricke.

== Qualifying rounds ==
=== Round One ===
- 8 June 2019
- (Scotland) Glasgow

| Pos. | Rider | Points | Details |
|---|---|---|---|
| 1 | (United Kingdom) Craig Cook | 15 | (3,3,3,3,3) |
| 2 | (Denmark) Niels-Kristian Iversen | 13+3 | (2,2,3,3,3) |
| 3 | (Sweden) Pontus Aspgren | 13+2 | (3,3,3,2,2) |
| 4 | (United Kingdom) Robert Lambert | 12 | (3,3,2,2,2) |
| 5 | (Australia) Chris Holder | 11 | (3,2,2,3,1) |
| 6 | (Italy) Nicolás Covatti | 11 | (2,3,2,1,3) |
| 7 | (United States) Broc Nicol | 9 | (2,2,1,1,3) |
| 8 | (Finland) Tero Aarnio | 7 | (1,1,1,2,2) |
| 9 | (Poland) Bartosz Smektała | 6 | (0,0,3,3,0) |
| 10 | (Sweden) Jacob Thorssell | 6 | (1,1,1,2,1) |
| 11 | (Czech Republic) Ondřej Smetana | 5 | (0,2,2,0,1) |
| 12 | (Norway) Glenn Moi | 3 | (1,0,0,0,2) |
| 13 | (United Kingdom) Kyle Bickley | 3 | (1,-,0,1,1) |
| 14 | (Denmark) Hans Andersen | 2 | (2,D,-,-,-) |
| 15 | (France) Dimitri Bergé | 2 | (0,1,D,1,0) |
| 16 | (Poland) Sebastian Niedźwiedź | 1 | (0,T,1,D,-) |
| 17 | (Australia) Rohan Tungate | 1 | (T,1,W,W,-) |
| 18 | (United Kingdom) Leon Flint | 0 | (-,0,0,0,0) |

=== Round Three ===
- 8 June 2019
- (France) Lamothe-Landerron

| Pos. | Rider | Points | Details |
|---|---|---|---|
| 1 | (France) David Bellego | 14 | (3,3,3,2,3) |
| 2 | (United Kingdom) Chris Harris | 13 | (2,3,3,3,2) |
| 3 | (Denmark) Mikkel Michelsen | 12+3 | (3,3,1,2,3) |
| 4 | (Australia) Max Fricke | 12+2 | (3,W,3,3,3) |
| 5 | (Poland) Szymon Woźniak | 11 | (1,2,3,2,3) |
| 6 | (Russia) Viktor Kulakov | 10 | (3,2,2,1,2) |
| 7 | (Sweden) Oliver Berntzon | 9 | (1,2,2,3,1) |
| 8 | (Germany) Kai Huckenbeck | 7 | (0,W,2,3,2) |
| 9 | (Germany) Max Dilger | 7 | (2,1,0,2,2) |
| 10 | (United States) Luke Becker | 6 | (2,2,1,0,1) |
| 11 | (New Zealand) Bradley Wilson-Dean | 5 | (0,3,0,1,1) |
| 12 | (France) Mathieu Trésarrieu | 5 | (2,1,1,0,1) |
| 13 | (Czech Republic) Zdeněk Holub | 5 | (1,1,2,1) |
| 14 | (France) Stephane Trésarrieu | 2 | (1,0,0,1,-) |
| 15 | (Finland) Jesse Mustonen | 2 | (0,1,1,0,D) |
| 16 | (Italy) Nicolas Vicentin | 0 | (D,0,0,0,0) |
| 17 | (France) Gaetan Stella | 0 | (-,-,-,-,0) |
| | (Slovenia) Nick Škorja | DNS | |

=== Round Two ===
- 8 June 2019
- (Slovakia) Žarnovica

| Pos. | Rider | Points | Details |
|---|---|---|---|
| 1 | (Denmark) Anders Thomsen | 14 | (3,2,3,3,3) |
| 2 | (Slovakia) Martin Vaculík | 13 | (2,3,3,3,2) |
| 3 | (Sweden) Peter Ljung | 12+3 | (3,2,3,2,2) |
| 4 | (Slovenia) Matej Žagar | 12+2 | (3,1,3,2,3) |
| 5 | (Latvia) Andžejs Ļebedevs | 10 | (1,3,2,1,3) |
| 6 | (Poland) Jarosław Hampel | 9 | (3,3,1,1,1) |
| 7 | (Poland) Krzysztof Buczkowski | 8 | (0,1,2,2,3) |
| 8 | (Russia) Andrey Kudryashov | 7 | (2,0,0,3,2) |
| 9 | (Czech Republic) Eduard Krčmář | 5 | (1,0,1,3,0) |
| 10 | (Russia) Gleb Chugunov | 5 | (1,3,0,1,0) |
| 11 | (United Kingdom) Dan Bewley | 5 | (1,0,2,2,0) |
| 12 | (Latvia) Oļegs Mihailovs | 5 | (2,2,0,0,1) |
| 13 | (Ukraine) Andrey Karpov | 5 | (T,2,1,D,2) |
| 14 | (Czech Republic) Josef Franc | 5 | (2,1,1,0,1) |
| 15 | (Hungary) Norbert Magosi | 3 | (0,1,2,0,0) |
| 16 | (Sweden) Joel Kling | 2 | (0,0,0,1,1) |
| 17 | (Slovakia) Jakub Valković | 0 | (0,-,-,-,-) |
| | (Slovakia) Jan Mihalík | DNS | |

=== Round Four ===
- 10 June 2019
- (Germany) Abensberg

| Pos. | Rider | Points | Details |
|---|---|---|---|
| 1 | (Germany) Martin Smolinski | 15 | (3,3,3,3,3) |
| 2 | (Ukraine) Aleksandr Loktaev | 13+3 | (3,1,3,3,3) |
| 3 | (Denmark) Kenneth Bjerre | 13+D | (3,3,2,2,3) |
| 4 | (Finland) Timo Lahti | 11 | (2,3,1,3,2) |
| 5 | (Poland) Paweł Przedpełski | 10 | (3,3,3,0,1) |
| 6 | (Croatia) Jurica Pavlic | 10 | (1,2,2,3,2) |
| 7 | (Czech Republic) Václav Milík | 9 | (2,0,3,1,3) |
| 8 | (Sweden) Linus Sundström | 9 | (2,2,2,2,1) |
| 9 | (Denmark) Mikkel Bech | 6 | (1,2,0,1,2) |
| 10 | (Italy) Michele Paco Castagna | 5 | (0,2,0,1,2) |
| 11 | (Germany) Tobias Busch | 5 | (2,D,0,2,1) |
| 12 | (United Kingdom) Charles Wright | 5 | (1,1,2,0,1) |
| 13 | (Slovenia) Matic Ivačič | 4 | (1,1,1,1,0) |
| 14 | (Norway) Lasse Fredriksen | 3 | (0,0,1,2,0) |
| 15 | (Hungary) Roland Kovacs | 2 | (0,1,1,0,0) |
| 16 | (Latvia) Ričards Ansviesulis | 0 | (0,0,0,0,0) |
| | (Germany) Valentin Grobauer | DNS | |
| | (Germany) Danny Maassen | DNS | |

== Final ==
=== 2019 Speedway Grand Prix Challenge ===
- 24 August 2019
- (Croatia) Goričan
- Pavlic was nominated as the wildcard.

| Pos. | Rider | Points | Details |
|---|---|---|---|
| 1 | (Slovenia) Matej Žagar | 11+3 | (2,1,3,2,3) |
| 2 | (Denmark) Niels-Kristian Iversen | 11+2 | (3,3,2,0,3) |
| 3 | (Australia) Max Fricke | 10+3 | (1,1,3,3,2) |
| 4 | (Slovakia) Martin Vaculík | 10+2 | (3,2,0,3,2) |
| 5 | (Denmark) Anders Thomsen | 9 | (0,2,3,1,3) |
| 6 | (Sweden) Pontus Aspgren | 9 | (2,3,1,3,D) |
| 7 | (Croatia) Jurica Pavlic | 9 | (2,0,2,3,2) |
| 8 | (Ukraine) Aleksandr Loktaev | 9 | (3,2,1,2,1) |
| 9 | (Denmark) Kenneth Bjerre | 8 | (3,3,2,0,D) |
| 10 | (Germany) Martin Smolinski | 7 | (1,W,3,2,1) |
| 11 | (United Kingdom) Craig Cook | 6 | (0,3,1,1,1) |
| 12 | (Sweden) Peter Ljung | 6 | (0,1,1,2,2) |
| 13 | (United Kingdom) Robert Lambert | 5 | (1,1,0,0,3) |
| 14 | (Denmark) Mikkel Michelsen | 5 | (2,0,2,1,0) |
| 15 | (France) David Bellego | 3 | (0,2,0,1,0) |
| 16 | (United Kingdom) Chris Harris | 2 | (1,0,0,0,1) |
| | (Slovenia) Matic Ivačič | DNS | |
| | (Hungary) Norbert Magosi | DNS | |

== See also ==
- 2020 Speedway Grand Prix
