= 2020 Speedway Grand Prix =

Speedway world championship

Season details
- Dates: 28 August - 3 October
- Events: 8
- Cities: 4
- Countries: 2
- Riders: 15 permanents 1 wild card(s); 2 track reserves
- Heats: 184 (in 8 events)

Winners
- Champion: POL Bartosz Zmarzlik
- Runner-up: GBR Tai Woffinden
- 3rd place: SWE Fredrik Lindgren

The 2020 Speedway Grand Prix season was the 26th season of the Speedway Grand Prix era, and decided the 75th FIM Speedway World Championship. It was the 20th series under the promotion of Benfield Sports International, an IMG company

A new points system was introduced with overall positions deciding the number of championship points a rider scored from a Grand Prix (GP), and points scored in each individual heat used to determine a rider's progress in a GP.

The series was dominated by Polish venues with six of the eight races held in Poland. Bartosz Zmarzlik was the defending champion, having won the 2019 Speedway Grand Prix series, and he successfully retained his title in 2020 by winning four of the eight rounds. Former three-time champion Tai Woffinden finished second after winning a run-off with Fredrik Lindgren. Maciej Janowski, Leon Madsen and Jason Doyle completed the top six, thus earning places in the 2021 series.

== Qualification ==
For the 2020 season there were 15 permanent riders, who were joined at each Grand Prix by one wild card and two track reserves.

The top eight riders from the 2019 championship qualified automatically. These riders were joined by the three riders who qualified via the Grand Prix Challenge.

The final four riders were nominated by series promoters, Benfield Sports International, following the completion of the 2019 season.

=== Qualified riders ===
#	Riders	2019 place	GP Ch place	Appearance	Previous appearances in series
95	(Poland) Bartosz Zmarzlik	1	—	5th	2012–2015, 2016–2019
30	(Denmark) Leon Madsen	2	—	2nd	2013, 2019
89	(Russia) Emil Sayfutdinov	3	—	9th	2009–2013, 2017–2019
66	(Sweden) Fredrik Lindgren	4	—	11th	2004, 2006–2007, 2008–2014, 2016, 2017–2019
54	(Slovakia) Martin Vaculík	5	4	5th	2012, 2013, 2017–2019
71	(Poland) Maciej Janowski	6	—	6th	2008, 2012, 2014, 2015–2019
69	(Australia) Jason Doyle	7	—	6th	2015–2019
692	(Poland) Patryk Dudek	8	—	4th	2016, 2017–2019
55	(Slovenia) Matej Žagar	9	1	10th	2003–2005, 2006–2007, 2008–2009, 2011, 2013–2019
88	(Denmark) Niels-Kristian Iversen	10	2	9th	2004–2005, 2006, 2008, 2009–2010, 2013–2017, 2018, 2019
46	(Australia) Max Fricke	16	3	1st	2016-2017, 2019
222	(Russia) Artem Laguta	11	—	4th	2011, 2018–2019
85	(Sweden) Antonio Lindbäck	12	—	10th	2004, 2005–2007, 2009–2010, 2011–2013, 2015, 2016–2017, 2019
108	(United Kingdom) Tai Woffinden	13	—	9th	2010, 2011, 2013–2019
155	(Denmark) Mikkel Michelsen•	17	14	1st	2015, 2018–2019

•Michelsen was handed a spot after initial wildcard pick Greg Hancock announced his retirement from the sport and first reserve Martin Smolinski withdrew due to injury.

=== Qualified substitutes ===
The following riders were nominated as substitutes:

#	Riders	2019 place	GP Ch place
115	(Poland) Bartosz Smektała	18	—
105	(Denmark) Anders Thomsen	—	5
20	(Sweden) Pontus Aspgren	—	6
96	(France) Dimitri Bergé	—	—

== Calendar ==
The 2020 season originally consisted of 10 events, the same number as in 2019. The Slovenian round had been replaced by a new round in Russia. The British Grand Prix was originally scheduled to be held on 18 July, but was cancelled on 1 June. The first round in Warsaw was postponed to 28 August, the Czech Grand Prix was postponed to 19 September and the German Grand Prix was postponed to an unknown date, all due to the COVID-19 pandemic. The rounds in Hallstavik and Målilla were cancelled on 18 June. On 29 July a final revised calendar was published by the organisers of the series, with a total of 8 rounds; 6 in Poland and 2 in the Czech Republic.

Round	Date	City and venue	Winner	Runner-up	3rd placed	4th placed	Results
1	28 August	(Poland) Wrocław, Poland; Olympic Stadium	(Russia) Artem Laguta	(Poland) Maciej Janowski	(Sweden) Fredrik Lindgren	(United Kingdom) Tai Woffinden	results
2	29 August	Wrocław, Poland; Olympic Stadium	(Poland) Maciej Janowski	(United Kingdom) Tai Woffinden	(Poland) Bartosz Zmarzlik	(Sweden) Fredrik Lindgren	results
3	11 September	Gorzów, Poland; Edward Jancarz Stadium	(Poland) Bartosz Zmarzlik	(Australia) Jason Doyle	(Sweden) Fredrik Lindgren	(Denmark) Leon Madsen	results
4	12 September	Gorzów, Poland; Edward Jancarz Stadium	(Sweden) Fredrik Lindgren	(Denmark) Leon Madsen	(Australia) Jason Doyle	(Russia) Emil Sayfutdinov	results
5	18 September	(Czech Republic) Prague, Czech Republic; Markéta Stadium	(Poland) Bartosz Zmarzlik	(United Kingdom) Tai Woffinden	(Slovakia) Martin Vaculík	(Russia) Emil Sayfutdinov	results
6	19 September	(Czech Republic) Prague, Czech Republic; Markéta Stadium	(Poland) Bartosz Zmarzlik	(United Kingdom) Tai Woffinden	(Australia) Jason Doyle	(Sweden) Fredrik Lindgren	results
7	2 October	Toruń, Poland; Rose Motoarena	(Australia) Max Fricke	(Poland) Maciej Janowski	(United Kingdom) Tai Woffinden	(Poland) Bartosz Zmarzlik	results
8	3 October	Toruń, Poland; Rose Motoarena	(Poland) Bartosz Zmarzlik	(Poland) Maciej Janowski	(Russia) Artem Laguta	(Sweden) Fredrik Lindgren	results

== Final Classification ==
Qualifies for next season's Grand Prix series
Full-time Grand Prix rider
Wild card, track reserve or qualified reserve

Pos.	Rider	Points	POL (Poland)	PL2 (Poland)	PL3 (Poland)	PL4 (Poland)	CZE (Czech Republic)	CZE (Czech Republic)	PL5 (Poland)	PL6 (Poland)
Gold	(Poland) (95) Bartosz Zmarzlik (C)	133	11	16	20	12	20	20	14	20
Silver	(United Kingdom) (108) Tai Woffinden	117	14	18	11	10	18	18	16	12
Bronze	(Sweden) (66) Fredrik Lindgren	117	16	14	16	20	12	14	11	14
4	(Poland) (71) Maciej Janowski	107	18	20	10	9	5	9	18	18
5	(Denmark) (30) Leon Madsen	89	12	6	14	18	9	11	9	10
6	(Australia) (69) Jason Doyle	87	6	2	18	16	11	16	7	11
7	(Russia) (222) Artem Laguta	84	20	12	8	5	10	5	8	16
8	(Russia) (89) Emil Sayfutdinov	81	10	5	7	14	14	10	12	9
9	(Slovakia) (54) Martin Vaculík	78	9	3	12	11	16	12	10	5
10	(Australia) (46) Max Fricke	64	2	10	4	8	8	8	20	4
11	(Slovenia) (55) Matej Žagar	46	8	4	9	6	3	7	6	3
12	(Poland) (692) Patryk Dudek	39	5	8	2	1	7	6	4	6
13	(Denmark) (88) Niels-Kristian Iversen	32	3	11	6	4	4	2	1	1
"	(Denmark) (155) Mikkel Michelsen	32	4	7	5	2	6	3	3	2
15	(Sweden) (85) Antonio Lindbäck	22	1	1	1	3	2	4	2	8
16	(Poland) (16) Gleb Chugunov	16	7	9	–	–	–	–	–	–
17	(Australia) (16) Jack Holder	12	–	–	–	–	–	–	5	7
18	(Denmark) (16) Anders Thomsen	10	–	–	3	7	–	–	–	–
19	(Czech Republic) (17) Eduard Krčmář	1	–	–	–	–	1	0	–	–
"	(Czech Republic) (16) Václav Milík	1	–	–	–	–	0	1	–	–
21	(Poland) (17) Rafał Karczmarz	0	–	–	0	0	–	–	–	–
"	(Poland) (18) Wiktor Jasiński	0	–	–	0	–	–	–	–	–
"	(Poland) (18) Przemysław Liszka	0	0	–	–	–	–	–	–	–
"	(Poland) (17) Michał Curzytek	0	0	–	–	–	–	–	–	–
"	(Czech Republic) (18) Jan Kvěch	0	–	–	–	–	0	–	–	–
Pos.	Rider	Points	POL (Poland)	PL2 (Poland)	PL3 (Poland)	PL4 (Poland)	CZE (Czech Republic)	CZE (Czech Republic)	PL5 (Poland)	PL6 (Poland)

== See also ==
- 2020 Individual Speedway Junior World Championship
