= 2021 Speedway Grand Prix Qualification =

The 2021 Individual Speedway World Championship Grand Prix Qualification was a one off meeting called the Grand Prix Challenge held at Goričan in Croatia. The qualifying rounds were cancelled due to COVID-19 pandemic which meant that national federations were asked to nominate a rider for the final.

The three riders that qualified for the 2021 Speedway Grand Prix were Matej Žagar, Oliver Berntzon and Krzysztof Kasprzak.

== Grand Prix Challenge ==
- 22 August 2020
- (Croatia) Goričan

Pos.	Rider	Points	Details
1	(Slovenia) Matej Žagar	13	(2,2,3,3,3)
2	(Sweden) Oliver Berntzon	12	(3,3,1,2,3)
3	(Poland) Krzysztof Kasprzak	12	(3,3,3,3,x)
4	(Ukraine) Aleksandr Loktaev	11	(3,3,3,2,fx)
5	(Czech Republic) Václav Milík Jr.	11	(3,2,1,3,2)
6	(Finland) Timo Lahti	8	(2,1,0,2,3)
7	(Australia) Max Fricke	8	(2,3,2,0,1)
8	(Denmark) Mikkel Michelsen	7	(x,1,3,3,r)
9	(Russia) Grigory Laguta	7	(x,2,1,1,3)
10	(Latvia) Jevgeņijs Kostigovs	7	(1,2,1,0,2)
11	(Croatia) Jurica Pavlic	5	(0,1,2,1,1)
12	(United Kingdom) Adam Ellis	4	(0,0,2,2,ns)
13	(Italy) Nico Covatti	4	(1,0,2,1,0)
14	(Germany) Kevin Wölbert	3	(1,1,0,0,1)
15	(United States) Broc Nicol	3	(2,0,0,1,0)
16	(France) Dimitri Bergé	2	(0,0,0,0,2)
	(Slovenia) Nick Škorja (Res)	2	
	(Hungary) Norbert Magosi (Res)	DNS	

== See also ==
- 2021 Speedway Grand Prix
