= Anders Thomsen =

Anders Thomsen may refer to:

- Anders Thomsen (footballer)
- Anders Thomsen (speedway rider)
