= Speedway Grand Prix of Russia =

Speedway event

(Russia) FIM Russian Speedway Grand Prix
- Stadium: Anatoly Stepanov Stadium, Tolyatti
- Years: 1 (2021)
- Track: speedway track
- Track Length: 353 m

Last Event (season 2021)
- Date: 28 August 2021

The Speedway Grand Prix of Russia is a speedway event that is a part of the Speedway Grand Prix Series. It was introduced in 2021 Speedway Grand Prix. The first staging was planned for 28 August 2021 at the Anatoly Stepanov Stadium in Tolyatti.

The 2022 edition was cancelled following the 2022 Russian invasion of Ukraine.

== Winners ==
	Season	City	Stadium	Winner
1	2021	Tolyatti	Anatoly Stepanov Stadium	Artem Laguta	result
