= Evgeny Saidullin =

Russian speedway rider

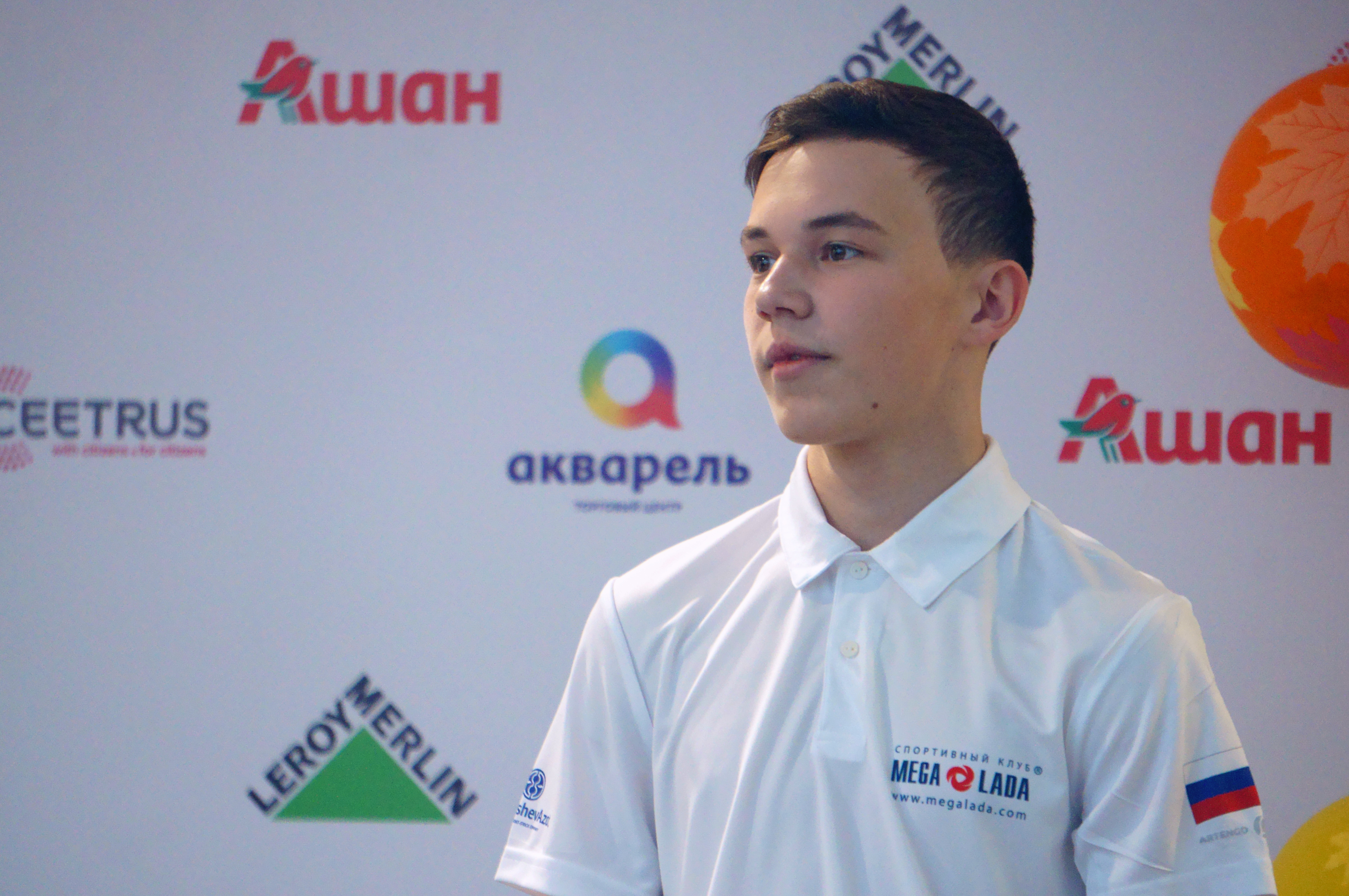
- Born: 14 December 2000 (age 25)
- Nationality: Russian

Career history

Russia
- 2017–2023: Togliatti

Individual honours
- 2019: European U19 silver

Team honours
- 2020: Speedway of Nations

Evgeny Vyacheslavovich Saidullin (born 14 December 2000) is an international speedway rider from Russia.

== Speedway career ==
Saidullin won the silver medal at the U19 European Championship. He won a gold medal at the 2020 Speedway of Nations despite being unused as the reserve rider for Emil Sayfutdinov and Artem Laguta. In 2021, he competed as reserve rider in the 2021 Speedway Grand Prix.

Saidullin also competes in Ice Speedway.
