= Richard Konwiarz =

German architect

Medal record

Art competitions

Representing Germany

Olympic Games
Bronze medal – third place	1932 Los Angeles	Architectural design

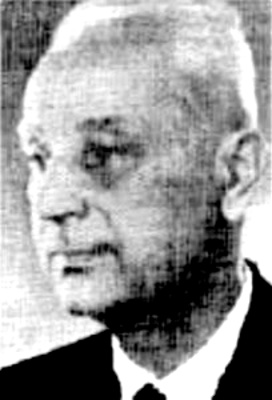

Richard Konwiarz (15 February 1883 – 14 December 1960) was a German architect. He was born in Tschempin and died in Hanover.

In 1932 he won a bronze medal in the art competitions of the Olympic Games for his design of the "Schlesierkampfbahn" in the Sport Park of Breslau.

In the years 1952 to 1954 he constructed in cooperation with Heinz Goesmann the Niedersachsenstadion in Hanover. Meanwhile, it is rebuilt and modified and called by its sponsor AWD-Arena.
