= Gleb Chugunov =

Russian motorcycle speedway rider

- Born: 17 December 1999 (age 26); Russia
- Nationality: Russian; Polish (rides on a Polish Licence)

Career history

Russia
- 2015–2019: Togliatti

Poland
- 2019–2022: Wrocław
- 2023: Grudziądz
- 2024: Ostrów
- 2025: Rybnik

Sweden
- 2019: Rospiggarna
- 2019, 2021, 2025-: Smederna
- 2022–2023: Västervik
- 2024: Indianerna

Denmark
- 2025: Region Varde

Team honours
- 2017: Speedway World Cup bronze medal
- 2018, 2019: Speedway of Nations gold medal

Gleb Sergeevich Chugunov (born 17 December 1999) is an international speedway rider from Russia, who rides on a Polish licence.

== Personal life ==
Chugunov is married to Polina Rodionova.

== Speedway career ==
Chugunov won a bronze medal at the Speedway World Cup in the 2017 Speedway World Cup. The following year, the competition was rebranded as the Speedway of Nations and Chugunov has twice been credited with a gold medal for being part of the victorious Russian side in 2018 and 2019.

In 2020, Chugunov switched his licence and now represents Poland. Chugunov controversially revealed that he married a Polish girl in order to obtain a Polish racing licence. The marriage allowed him to race while Russian riders were banned.

Chugunov signed for GKM Grudziądz for the 2023 Polish speedway season. After two seasons with Västervik he signed for Indianerna for the 2024 Swedish speedway season.

== Major results ==
=== World individual Championship ===
- 2020 Speedway Grand Prix - 16th (6pts)
- 2021 Speedway Grand Prix - 19th (8pts)
- 2022 Speedway Grand Prix - 20th (7pts)

=== World Cup ===
- 2017 - (Poland) Leszno, Stadion Alfreda Smoczyka (with Emil Sayfutdinov / Vadim Tarasenko / Andrey Kudriashov) - 3rd - 18pts

=== Speedway of Nations ===
- 2018 - (Russia) Tolyatti, Anatoly Stepanov Stadium (with Emil Sayfutdinov / Artem Laguta ) - 1st
- 2019 - (Poland) Wrocław, Olympic Stadium (with Emil Sayfutdinov / Artem Laguta ) - 1st
