= MOSiR Stadium (Bystrzyca) =

Stadium in Lublin, Poland

Coordinates: 51°14′20″N 22°33′54″E

Stadion MOSiR Bystrzyca
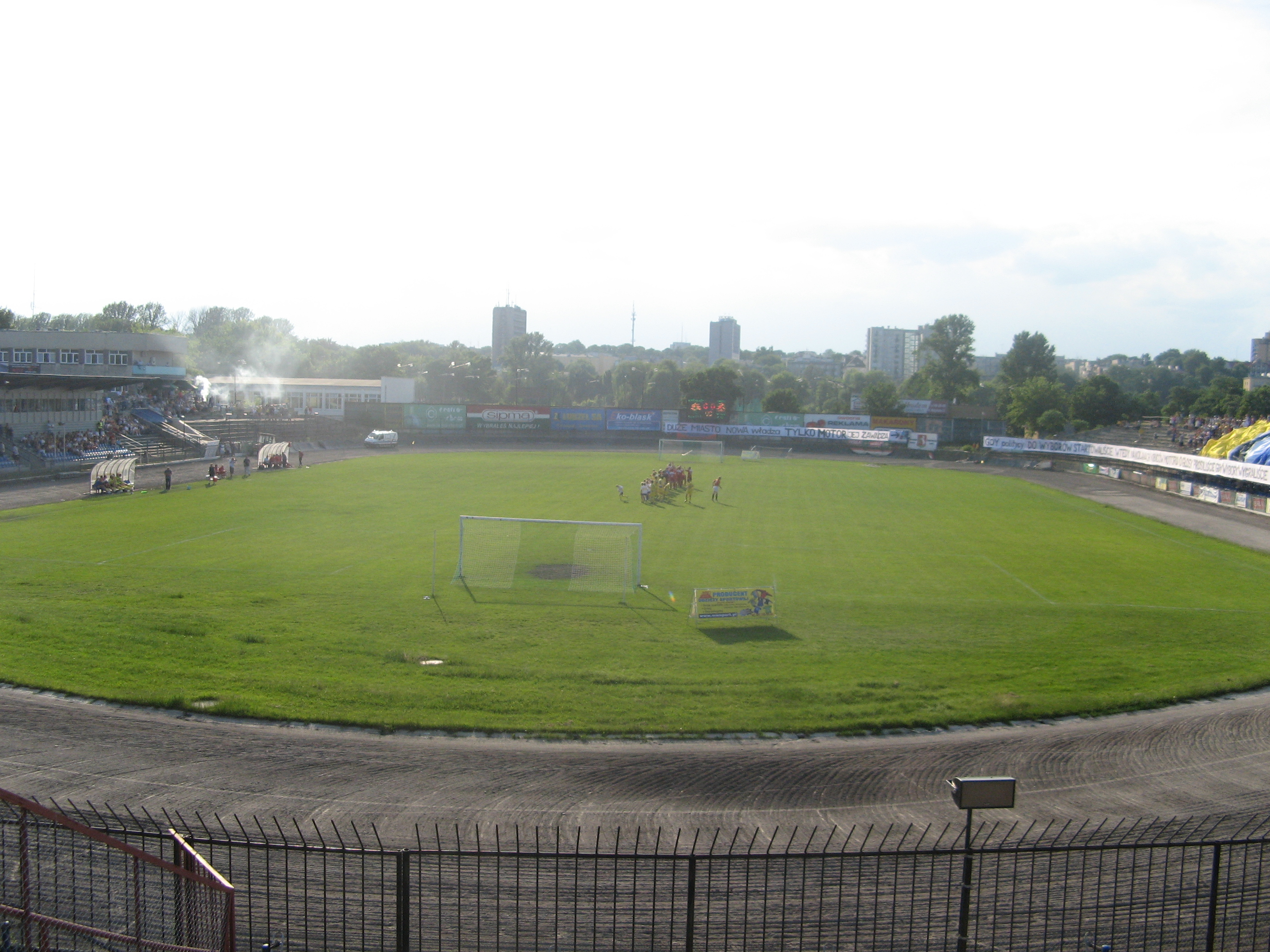
- Interactive map of Stadion MOSiR Bystrzyca
- Location: al. Zygmuntowskie, Lublin, Poland
- Owner: City of Lublin
- Operator: MOSiR Bystrzyca
- Capacity: 13,000
- Record attendance: 30,000; Motor Lublin vs Resovia; 19 June 1983
- Field size: 100m x 60m speedway track (370 metres)

Construction
- Built: 1948

Tenants
- Motor Lublin (1970−2014); Lublin speedway team (1948−2015, 2017–present)

Stadion MOSiR Bystrzyca also known as the Municipal Stadium or Z5 is a multi-use stadium in Lublin, Poland. It is currently used for motorcycle speedway and football matches. The stadium holds 13,000 people.

The venue is used by the speedway team Motor Lublin, who compete in the Team Speedway Polish Championship.

== History ==
The stadium was constructed in 1948 and later terracing was added by the Lublin Motorcycle Club. From 1958 to 1962 the stadium was closed because no speedway team existed in Lublin.

Football followed in 1970 and the venue hosted the Motor Lublin football team, including the years when they were in the Ekstraklasa (top division) during the 1980s. The stadium held the 1979 Polish Cup final and on 19 June 1983, a record attendance of 30,000 saw Motor Lublin play Resovia.

In July 2007, the stadium underwent partial renovation (including the installation of additional seats), necessary to obtain a license to perform in the then second football league. A large part of the modernization work was carried out with the active help of Lublin football fans. The plans included further modernization of the stadium to accommodate approximately 17,800 spectators. The works were to be carried out in the years from 2008 to 2010, and the cost of the reconstruction was estimated at Polish złoty 115 million. The entire project was to be handled by the Warsaw entrepreneur SPAK Studio Projektowe. Ultimately, however, it was decided that by 2013 the city would build a new city stadium called the Arena Lublin on the premises of the former Lublin Sugar Plant.

In 2018, major temporary renovation which was completed.

In 2021, the stadium was able to host two rounds of the FIM 2021 Speedway Grand Prix (world championship), following a rearranged calendar because of the previous impact of the COVID-19 pandemic. The events were won by Bartosz Zmarzlik and Artem Laguta respectively.
