= Olympic Stadium (Wrocław) =

Multi-purpose stadium in Wrocław, Poland

- Stadion Olimpijski
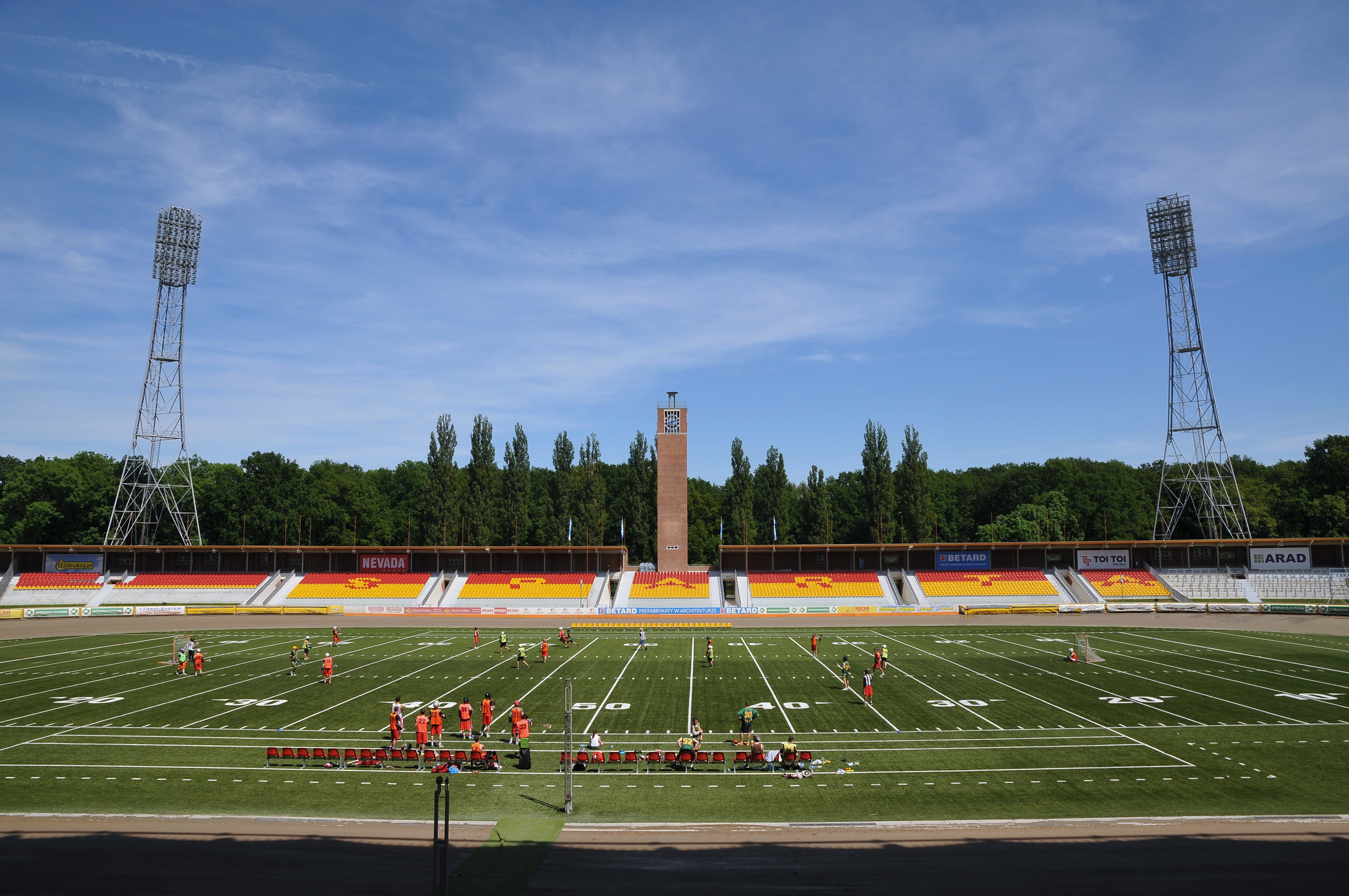
- Interactive map of Olympic Stadium
- Full name: Olympic Stadium in Wrocław
- Former names: Schlesierkampfbahn (1928–1935); Hermann-Göring-Stadion (1935–1939)
- Location: Wrocław, Poland
- Coordinates: 51°7′10″N 17°5′48″E
- Owner: City of Wrocław
- Capacity: 13,675
- Surface: Artificial Grass (football); Shale (speedway)

Construction
- Built: 1926–1928
- Opened: 1928
- Renovated: 1935–1939
- Architect: Richard Konwiarz

Tenants
- WTS Sparta Wrocław (1950–present); Panthers Wrocław (2014–present); Devils Wrocław (2006–2013); Giants Wrocław (2006–2013); Poland national football team (selected matches, 1950–1987); WKS Śląsk Wrocław (selected matches, 1947–1987); Germany national football team (selected matches, 1930–1941)

The Olympic Stadium (Polish: Stadion Olimpijski) is a multi-purpose stadium in Wrocław, Poland. It is the home stadium of motorcycle speedway team WTS Sparta Wrocław and American football team Panthers Wrocław.

The stadium has a capacity now of 11,000 people and was supposed to be one of the main pitches on UEFA Euro 2012. The newly constructed Stadion Miejski was used for that event instead.

== History ==
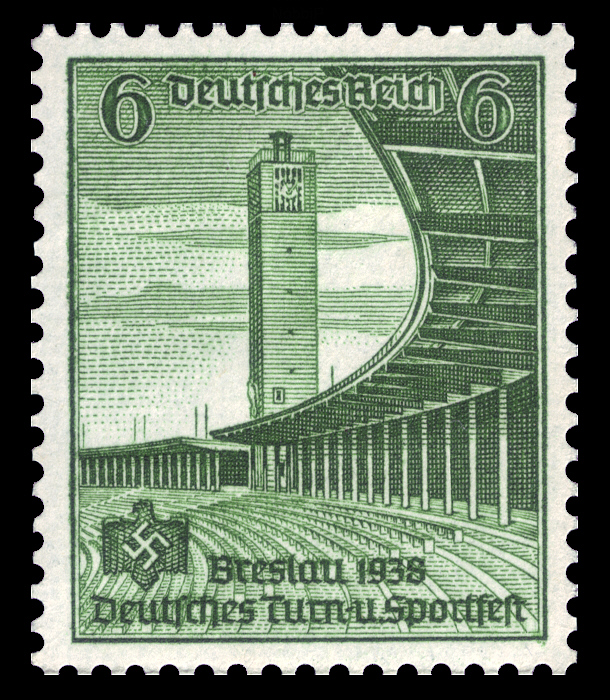
Interior of the original Schlesierkampfbahn ('Silesian Arena'), renamed Hermann-Göring-Stadion in 1937.

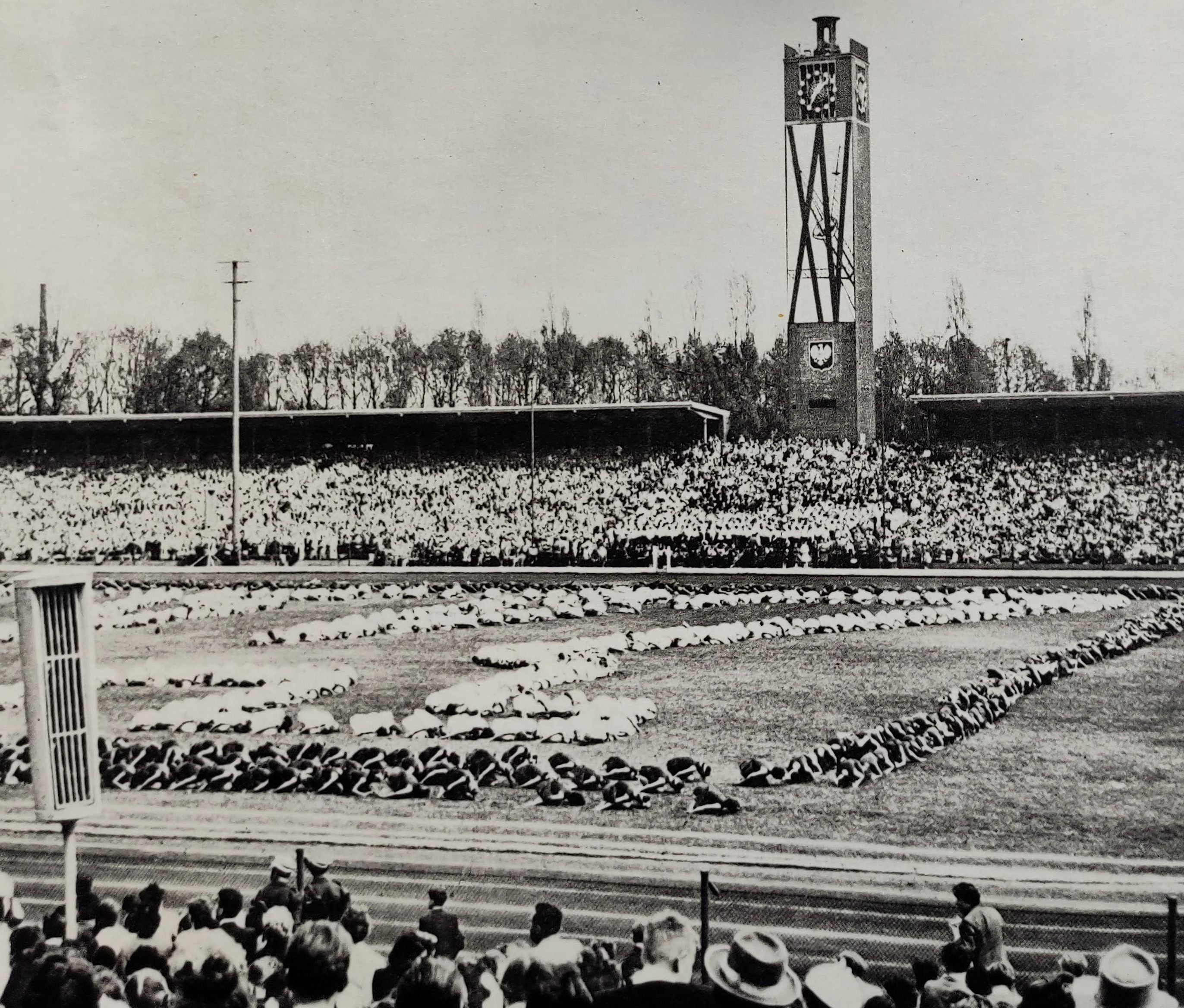
Gymnastics performances at the stadium in 1967

The stadium was built from 1926 to 1928 as Schlesierkampfbahn (Silesian Arena) according to a design by Richard Konwiarz. It was part of a larger sports complex in the city district of Zalesie (then Leerbeutel), again extended from 1935 to 1939 and renamed Hermann-Göring-Stadion under the Nazi German authorities. On 16 May 1937, it was the site of the legendary Breslau Eleven football match, when the Germany national football team defeated Denmark 8–0. Despite its current Polish name, the arena has never been an Olympic Games site (in particular, for the 1936 Summer Olympics); however the builder Richard Konwiarz achieved a bronze medal in the art competitions at the 1932 Summer Olympics in Los Angeles for his architectural design.

Heavily devastated during the Siege of Breslau in World War II, the stadium was rebuilt by the Polish municipal administration and named after General Karol Świerczewski. From the 1970s it was used by the Wrocław University School of Physical Education and comprehensively modernized with floodlights and an undersoil heating. The Wrocław city administration assumed ownership in 2006 and had the speedway racing track rebuilt, whereafter the smaller football pitch no longer met the requirements of UEFA stadium categories.

The speedway track is 387 metres (423 yd) in length.

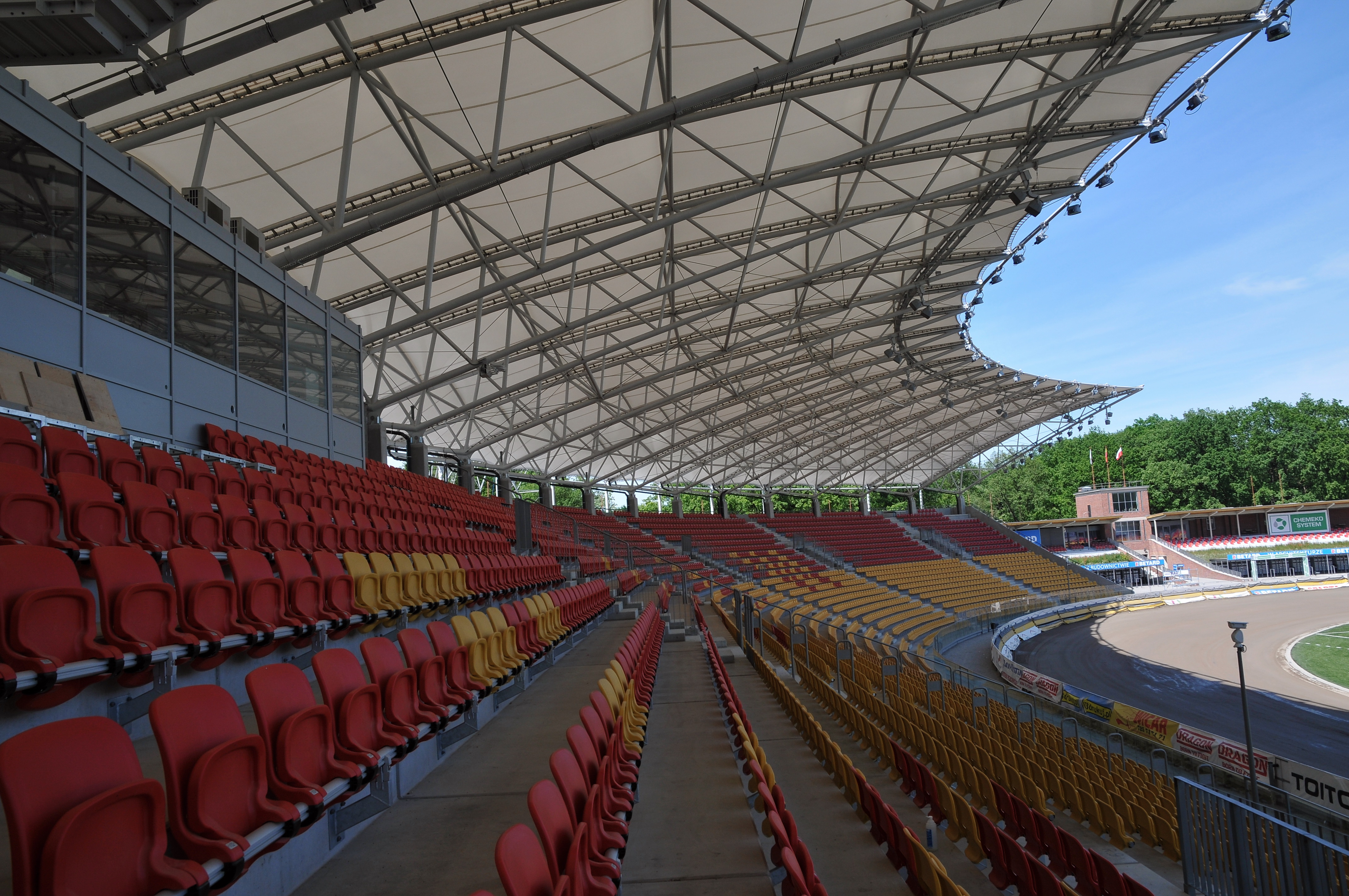
Covered stand

== Past events ==
The stadium has hosted the Speedway Grand Prix of Poland in 1995, 1996, 1997, 1999, and 2000. It also was a venue of the Speedway Grand Prix of Europe in 2004, 2005, 2006, and 2007. The stadium has hosted american football competition and motorcycle speedway competition at 2017 World Games.

== Speedway World Finals ==
=== Individual World Championship ===
- 1970 – (New Zealand) Ivan Mauger – 15pts
- 1992 – (United Kingdom) Gary Havelock – 14pts

=== World Pairs Championship ===
- 1975 – Sweden (Anders Michanek / Tommy Jansson) – 24pts

=== World Team Cup ===
- 1961 – Poland (Marian Kaiser / Henryk Żyto / Florian Kapała / Mieczysław Połukard / Stanislaw Tkocz) – 32pts
- 1966 – Poland (Andrzej Pogorzelski / Marian Rose / Antoni Woryna / Andrzej Wyglenda) – 41pts
- 1971 – (United Kingdom) Great Britain (Ray Wilson / Ivan Mauger / Jim Airey / Barry Briggs / Ronnie Moore)* – 37pts
- 1977 – England (Peter Collins / Michael Lee / Dave Jessup / John Davis / Malcolm Simmons) – 37pts
- 1980 – England (Michael Lee / Chris Morton / Peter Collins / Dave Jessup / John Davis) – 40pts

* The Great Britain Speedway Team contained riders from the Commonwealth nations until the early 1970s. Mauger, Briggs and Moore were from New Zealand, Airey from Australia and Wilson from England.

=== Speedway World Cup ===
- 2001 – Australia (Jason Crump / Leigh Adams / Ryan Sullivan / Todd Wiltshire / Craig Boyce) – 68pts
- 2005 – Poland (Tomasz Gollob / Piotr Protasiewicz / Jarosław Hampel / Rune Holta / Grzegorz Walasek) – 62pts

== Speedway Grand Prix ==
- 1995 Speedway Grand Prix of Poland – Tomasz Gollob
- 1996 Speedway Grand Prix of Poland – (Denmark) Tommy Knudsen
- 1997 Speedway Grand Prix of Poland – (United States) Greg Hancock
- 1999 Speedway Grand Prix of Poland – Tomasz Gollob
- 2004 Speedway Grand Prix of Europe – (Denmark) Bjarne Pedersen
- 2005 Speedway Grand Prix of Europe – (Sweden) Tony Rickardsson
- 2006 Speedway Grand Prix of Europe – (Australia) Jason Crump
- 2007 Speedway Grand Prix of Europe – (Denmark) Nicki Pedersen
- 2019 Speedway Grand Prix of Poland II – Bartosz Zmarzlik
- 2020 Speedway Grand Prix of Poland – (Russia) – Artem Laguta
- 2020 Speedway Grand Prix of Poland II – Maciej Janowski
- 2021 Speedway Grand Prix of Poland – Bartosz Zmarzlik
- 2021 Speedway Grand Prix of Poland II – Bartosz Zmarzlik
- 2022 Speedway Grand Prix of Poland III – (England) Dan Bewley
- 2024 Speedway Grand Prix of Poland III – (Slovakia) Martin Vaculík

== National football team matches ==
No	Date	Host	–	Opponent	Result
1.	2 November 1930	Germany	–	Norway	1:1
2.	15 September 1935	Germany	–	Poland	1:0
3.	16 May 1937	Germany	–	Denmark	8:0
4.	12 November 1939	Germany	–	Czech Republic	4:4
5.	7 December 1941	Germany	–	Slovakia	4:0
6.	14 May 1950	Poland	–	Romania	3:3
7.	10 May 1953	Poland	–	Czechoslovakia	1:1
8.	26 August 1956	Poland	–	Bulgaria	1:2
9.	21 June 1959	Poland	–	Israel	7:2
10.	22 October 1961	Poland	–	East Germany	3:1
11.	18 May 1966	Poland	–	Sweden	1:1
12.	28 July 1967	Poland	–	Soviet Union	0:1
13.	16 May 1973	Poland	–	Republic of Ireland	2:0
14.	7 September 1974	Poland	–	France	0:2
15.	12 November 1977	Poland	–	Sweden	2:1
16.	15 November 1978	Poland	–	Switzerland	2:0
17.	15 November 1981	Poland	–	Malta	6:0
18.	28 October 1983	Poland	–	Portugal	0:1
19.	24 March 1987	Poland	–	Norway	4:1
