= Motoarena Toruń =

Polish motorcycle speedway track

Motoarena Toruń im. Mariana Rosego
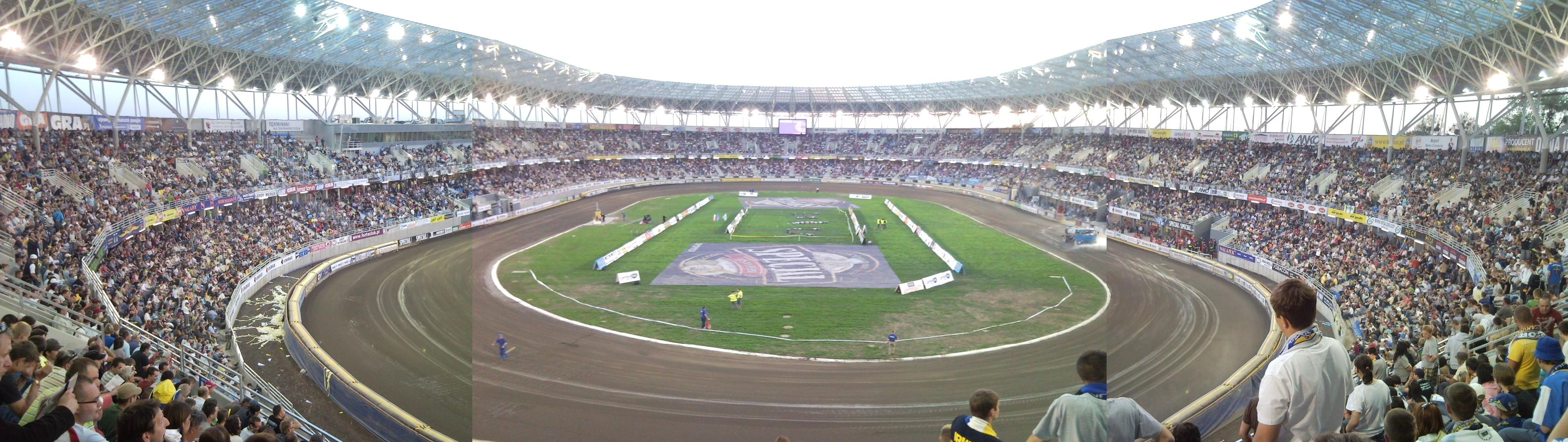
- Interactive map of Motoarena Toruń im. Mariana Rosego
- Location: Toruń, Poland
- Coordinates: 53°0′56″N 18°33′4″E
- Owner: Toruń City
- Operator: MOSiR Toruń
- Capacity: 15,500
- Field size: 318 metres (348 yards)

Construction
- Opened: 3 May 2009

Tenant
- Speedway team: KS Toruń

Motoarena Toruń im. Mariana Rosego is a multi-use stadium in Toruń, Poland. It is currently used mostly for motorcycle speedway matches and it is used for car racing and concerts and it is the home stadium of KS Toruń in the Speedway Ekstraliga. The stadium has a capacity of 15,500 people and was opened on 3 May 2009. It is named after Marian Rose, former speedway rider from Toruń.

The speedway track is 318 metres (348 yards) long. Since 2010, a round of the Speedway Grand Prix has been held at the Motoarena.

== Hosted ==
=== International ===
- Speedway Grand Prix: 2010 to 2024.
- European Speedway Club Champions' Cup: 2009 Final
- Speedway of Nations: 2025

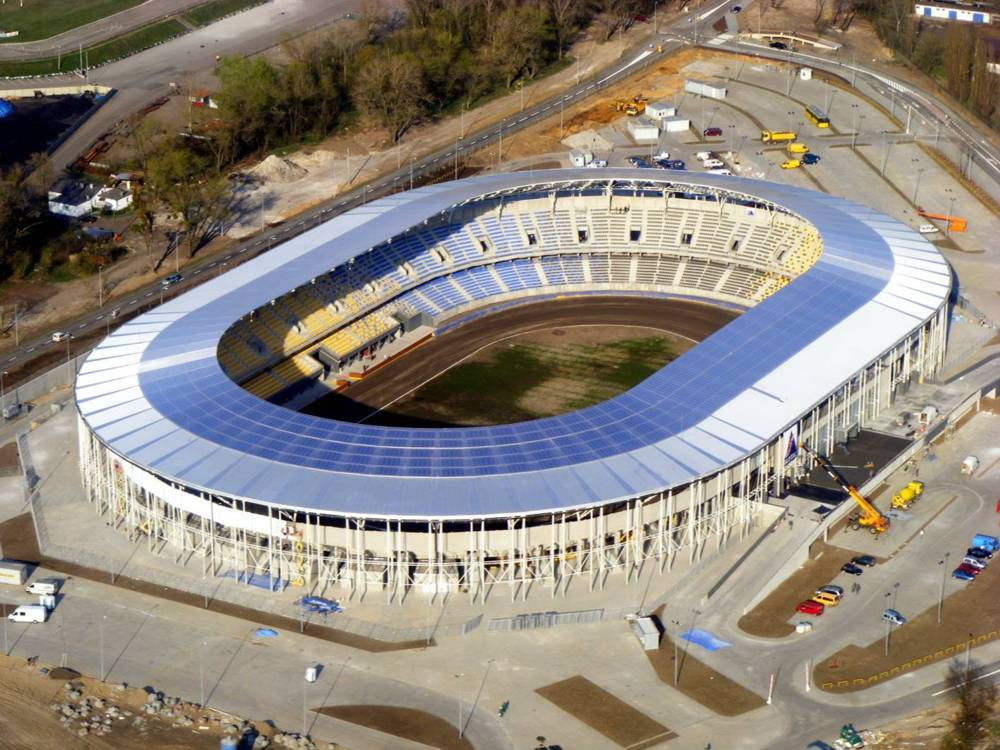
A bird's eye view

=== Polish Championships ===
- Individual Speedway Polish Championship Final: 2009
- Polish Pairs Speedway Championship Final: 2010
- Speedway Ekstraliga Final: 2009, 2025
- Team Speedway Junior Polish Championship Final: 2009

=== Musical events ===
- 2010: José Carreras
- 2011: Rod Stewart

== See also ==
- Speedway in Poland
