= Artem Laguta =

Speedway rider

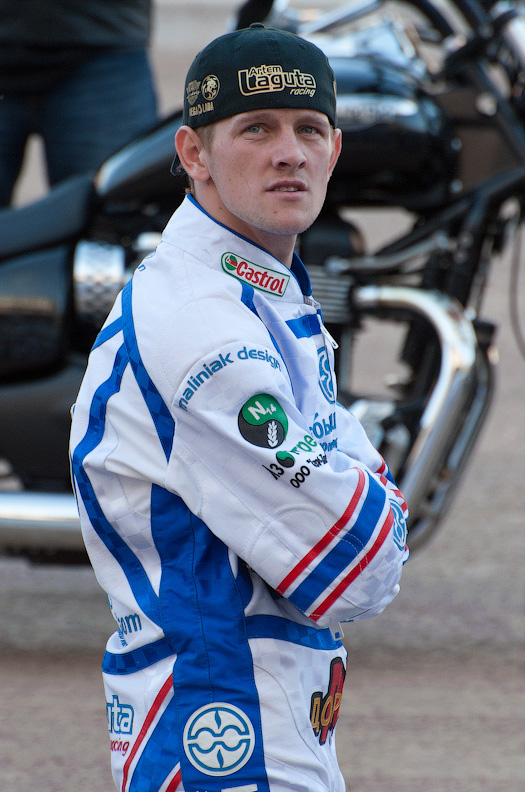
- Born: 13 November 1990 (age 36); Vladivostok, Russia
- Nationality: Russian (rides on a Polish licence)

Career history

Russia
- 2007–2010, 2015–2016, 2019: Vladivostok
- 2011–2013, 2017: Togliatti
- 2014: Balakovo

Poland
- 2008-2009: Daugavpils
- 2011: Częstochowa
- 2012: Bydgoszcz
- 2013–2014: Tarnów
- 2015–2020: Grudziądz
- 2021, 2023–2026: Wrocław

Sweden
- 2011–2012: Valsarna
- 2013: Hammarby
- 2014: Vargarna
- 2015: Indianerna
- 2016, 2018–2019: Vetlanda
- 2021: Västervik
- 2024–2025: Rospiggarna
- 2026: Dackarna

Denmark
- 2013–2015: Esbjerg

Great Britain
- 2023: King's Lynn
- 2023: Peterborough

Speedway Grand Prix statistics
- Winner: 6 times

Individual honours
- 2021: World Champion
- 2010, 2011: Russian Champion
- 2010: GP Challenge winner

Team honours
- 2018, 2019, 2020: World Team Champion

Artem Grigoryevich Laguta (Russian: Артём Григорьевич Лагута; born 13 November 1990) is a Russian motorcycle speedway rider and former member of the Russian national team. He is the 2021 World Champion.

== Career details ==
Laguta became the Russian champion in 2010 and 2011.

In August 2010, during the Speedway Grand Prix Qualification, Laguta won the GP Challenge, which ensured that he claimed a permanent slot for the 2011 Grand Prix.

Laguta is also a three-time world team champion with Russia after partnering Emil Sayfutdinov during three consecutive years, as Russia won the Speedway of Nations in 2018, 2019 and 2020. In April 2020, he obtained a dual national speedway licence after obtaining a Polish licence, although he continued to represent Russia.

Laguta became the 2021 Individual World Champion after winning the 2021 Speedway Grand Prix with 192 points. He won five rounds out of eleven and overtook defending champion Bartosz Zmarzlik in the points standings in round 10, which proved to be the pivotal moment of the Championship.

From 2022 to 2024, Laguta was unable to defend his world title following the Fédération Internationale de Motocyclisme ban on Russian and Belarusian motorcycle riders, teams, officials, and competitions as a result of the 2022 Russian invasion of Ukraine.

In June 2023, Laguta signed for King's Lynn Stars for his first season in British speedway, where he competed in the SGB Premiership 2023.

== Major results ==
=== World individual Championship ===
- 2018 Speedway Grand Prix – 6th (97 pts)
- 2019 Speedway Grand Prix – 11th (76 pts)
- 2020 Speedway Grand Prix – 7th (84 pts)
- 2021 Speedway Grand Prix – Champion (192 pts)

=== Grand Prix wins ===
- 1: 2020 Speedway Grand Prix of Poland (Wrocław)
- 2: 2021 Speedway Grand Prix of Czech Republic
- 3: 2021 Speedway Grand Prix of Poland (Lublin)
- 4: 2021 Speedway Grand Prix of Russia
- 5: 2021 Speedway Grand Prix of Denmark
- 6: 2021 Speedway Grand Prix of Poland (Toruń)

=== World team Championships ===
- 2010 Speedway World Cup – 6th
- 2012 Speedway World Cup – 3rd
- 2016 Speedway World Cup – 6th
- 2018 Speedway of Nations – Champion
- 2019 Speedway of Nations – Champion
- 2020 Speedway of Nations – Champion

=== World junior championships ===
- 2008 – 4th place in the Qualifying Round 1
- 2009 – (Croatia) Goričan - 12th place (4 pts)

=== European Junior Championships ===
- 2007 – (Poland) Częstochowa - 7th place (9 pts)
- 2008 – (Germany) Stralsund - 5th place (10 pts)
- 2008 – 2nd place in the Semi-Final 2
- 2009 – (Poland) Tarnów - 4th place (13 pts + 3rd in Run-Off)

=== Domestic competitions ===
- Team Polish Championship (League)
  - 2008 – 5th place in the First League for Daugavpils (Average 1.894)
  - 2009 – for Daugavpils

== Personal life ==
Laguta's brother Grigory is also an international speedway rider and four-time Russian champion and his nephew is Vadim Tarasenko. In 2024, he joined Rospiggarna in the Swedish Elitserien.

== See also ==
- Russia national speedway team
