= Matej Žagar =

Slovenian motorcycle speedway rider (born 1983)

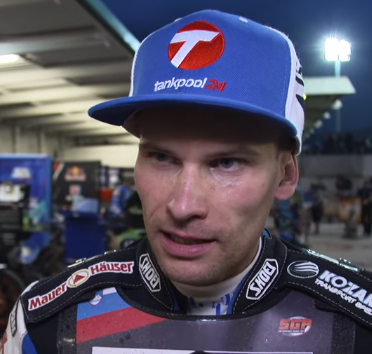
- Žagar in 2019
- Born: 3 April 1983 (age 43); Ljubljana, Slovenia
- Nationality: Slovenian
- Website: official website

Career history

Great Britain
- 2003: Trelawny
- 2004–2007: Reading
- 2009: Swindon
- 2010: Eastbourne
- 2013–2016, 2022: Belle Vue
- 2025: Birmingham

Poland
- 2006, 2017–2019: Częstochowa
- 2007: Toruń
- 2008: Rzeszów
- 2009–2012, 2014–2016: Gorzów
- 2013: Gniezno
- 2020: Lublin
- 2021: Zielona Góra
- 2022: Bydgoszcz
- 2023: Rybnik
- 2025: Tarnów

Sweden
- 2006: Vargarna
- 2007: Kaparna
- 2008: Hammarby
- 2013: Piraterna
- 2016–2017: Smederna

Denmark
- 2019: Slangerup
- 2022: SES
- 2023–2024: Grindsted
- 2025: Region Varde

Speedway Grand Prix statistics
- SGP number: 55
- Starts: 108
- Finalist: 23 times
- Winner: 5 times

Individual honours
- 2004, 2008: European Champion
- 2002: Under-19 European Champion
- 18 times: Slovenian Speedway Champion
- 2014, 2020, 2021: GP Challenge winner

Team honours
- 2003: European Club Champion
- 2014, 2016: Ekstraliga Champion
- 2013, 2014: Czech Republic Championship
- 2022: British champions

Matej Žagar (born 3 April 1983 in Ljubljana, Slovenia) is a Slovenian motorcycle speedway rider who was won two Individual Speedway European Champion titles in 2008 and 2009. He is 18-time Slovenian Speedway Champion.

== Career ==
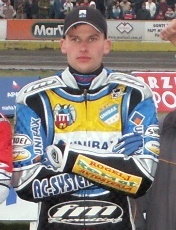
Žagar in 2007

In 2002, Žagar won the 2002 Individual Speedway Junior European Championship and the following year made his debut in the Individual World Championship.

Žagar began his career in the United Kingdom with the Trelawny Tigers in 2003 before moving to the Reading Racers in 2004 when the Tigers closed. He became a permanent rider in the 2006 Speedway Grand Prix and 2007 Speedway Grand Prix seasons. In the UK he represented Reading, Swindon and Eastbourne before quitting the United Kingdom after an underwhelming 2010 campaign. He was touted as a potential GP wildcard for the 2012 SGP season following impressive and consistent performances in the Polish Extraliga with Gorzow, but turned down the opportunity to replace Darcy Ward due to the 1GP rider in the Extraliga and his contract with Gorzow, where 2010 world champion Tomasz Gollob was signed up. He returned to the UK after signing for the Belle Vue Aces in 2013 and rode for them until 2016.

In September 2014, during the Speedway Grand Prix Qualification, Žagar won the GP Challenge, which ensured that he claimed a permanent slot for the 2015 Grand Prix.

In August 2019, Žagar won the GP Challenge for the second time in his career, which ensured that he claimed a permanent slot for the 2020 Speedway Grand Prix. He then became the first rider in history to win a third GP Challenge when he won it for a third time in 2020.

In 2021, after nine consecutive Grand Prix seasons and finishing in 13th place, Žagar lost his permanent place in the Grand Prix World Championship but did ride in the 2022 season opener in his home country.

In 2022, Žagar once again returned to the British speedway with the Belle Vue Aces and was part of the team that won the league title during the SGB Premiership 2022. Also in 2022, he helped SES win the 2022 Danish Super League. He raced for Grinstead during 2023 and 2024.

Žagar signed for Birmingham Brummies for the SGB Premiership 2025.

== Career highlights ==
=== Individual World Championship ===
- 2003 - 30th place (5 points)
- 2004 - 27th place (8 points)
- 2005 - 16th place (23 points)
- 2006 - 7th place (97 points)
- 2007 - 14th place (54 points)
- 2008 - 20th place (7 points)
- 2009 - 19th place (7 points)
- 2011 - 19th place (14 points)
- 2013 - 7th place (110 points)
- 2014 - 5th place (114 points) - including Finnish Grand prix win
- 2015 - 6th place (107 points) - including Warsaw and Gorzow Grand Prix wins
- 2016 - 9th place (90 points)
- 2017 - 7th place (107 points) - including German and Scandinavian Grand Prix wins
- 2018 - 10th place (79 points)
- 2019 - 9th place (78 points)
- 2020 - 11th place (46 points)
- 2021 - 13th place (45 points)
- 2022 - 18th place (11 points)
- 2023 - =26th place (1 point)
- 2023 - =27th place (2 points)

=== Individual U-21 World Championship ===
- 2004 - 6th place (8 points)
- 2004 - track reserve (1 point)
- 2004 - 5th place (10 points)
- 2004 - 3rd place (8 points and 3rd in Final)

=== Team World Championship ===
- 2001 - 6 points in Preliminary Round 1
- 2002 - 10th-11th place (5 points in Event 3)
- 2003 - 9th place (13 points in Event 2)
- 2004 - 9th-10th place (18 points in Qualifying Round 2)
- 2005 - 9th-10th place (11 points in Qualifying Round 2)
- 2006 - 9th-10th place (17 points in Qualifying Round 2)
- 2007 - 13th-14th place (16 points in Qualifying Round 1)
- 2008 - 11th-12th place
- 2009 - 4th place in Semi-finals (10 points in semi-final)
- 2010 - 9th-10th place
- 2011 - 9th-10th place
- 2012 - 9th-10th place
- 2013 - 9th-10th place
- 2014 - 11th place
- 2015 - 11th place
- 2016 - 12th place

=== Individual European Championship ===
- 2002 - 15th place (4 points)
- 2003 - 4th place (10 points)
- 2004 - European Champion (14+3 points)
- 2006 - 17th place (0 points)
- 2008 - European Champion (14 points)

=== Individual U-19 European Championship ===
- 2000 - 11th place (8 points)
- 2001 - track reserve (2 points)
- 2002 - European Champion (15 points)

=== European Pairs Championship ===
- 2005 - 3rd place (14 points)
- 2006 - 2nd place (11 points)

=== Slovenian Championship ===
He is a 17 times champion of Slovenia in 2002, 2003, 2004, 2005, 2006, 2007, 2008, 2009, 2010, 2011, 2012, 2013, 2014, 2015, 2016, 2017 and 2018.

== Speedway Grand Prix results ==
Year	Position	Points	Best Finish	Notes
2003	30th	5	15th	Wild card ride
2004	26th	8	9th	Wild card ride
2005	16th	23	3rd	2 Wild card rides
2006	7th	97	2nd	First full season as a GP rider
2006	14th	54	7th	second full season as a GP rider
2008	20th	7	9th	1 Wild card ride
2009	19th	7	10th	1 Wild card ride
2011	19th	14	8th	2 Wild card rides
2013	7th	110	2nd	third full season as a GP rider
2014	5th	114	1st	fourth full season as a GP rider
2015	6th	107	1st	fifth full season as a GP rider
2016	9th	90	3rd	sixth full season + wild card for the next year
2017	7th	107	1st	
2018	10th	79	2nd	
2019	9th	78	2nd	
2020	11th	46	8th	
2021	13th	45	9th	
2022	18th	11	6th	
2023	=26th	1	16th	
2024	=27th	1	15th	

== See also ==
- Slovenia national speedway team
- List of Speedway Grand Prix riders
