= Oliver Berntzon =

Swedish speedway rider

- Born: 2 August 1993 (age 33); Anderstorp, Sweden
- Nationality: Swedish

Career history

Sweden
- 2013–2014: Smederna
- 2016–2017: Vetlanda
- 2019–2020: Dackarna
- 2021–2025: Lejonen
- 2024–2025: Örnarna

Poland
- 2022–2023, 2025: Ostrów
- 2024: Łódź

Denmark
- 2010: Vojens
- 2011: Fjelsted
- 2013: Outrup
- 2017: Esbjerg
- 2023: SES

Individual honours
- 2022: Swedish Champion

Team honours
- 2024: Elitserien champion

Oliver Berntzon (born 2 August 1993) is an international speedway rider from Sweden.

== Speedway career ==
Berntzon won the silver medal at the Swedish Championship in 2018. He qualified for the 2018 Speedway Grand Prix and the 2021 Speedway Grand Prix.

In 2022, Berntzon became the national champion of Sweden after winning the 2022 Swedish Individual Speedway Championship.

In 2023, Berntzon was part of the Swedish team that competed at the 2023 Speedway World Cup in Poland. In 2024, he helped Lejonen win the Elitserien during the 2024 Swedish speedway season.

== Major results ==
=== World individual Championship ===
- 2018 Speedway Grand Prix - 23rd (3 pts)
- 2019 Speedway Grand Prix - 19th (7 pts)
- 2021 Speedway Grand Prix - 15th (32 pts)
- 2022 Speedway Grand Prix - 23rd (5 pts)
