= Anders Thomsen (speedway rider) =

Danish speedway rider

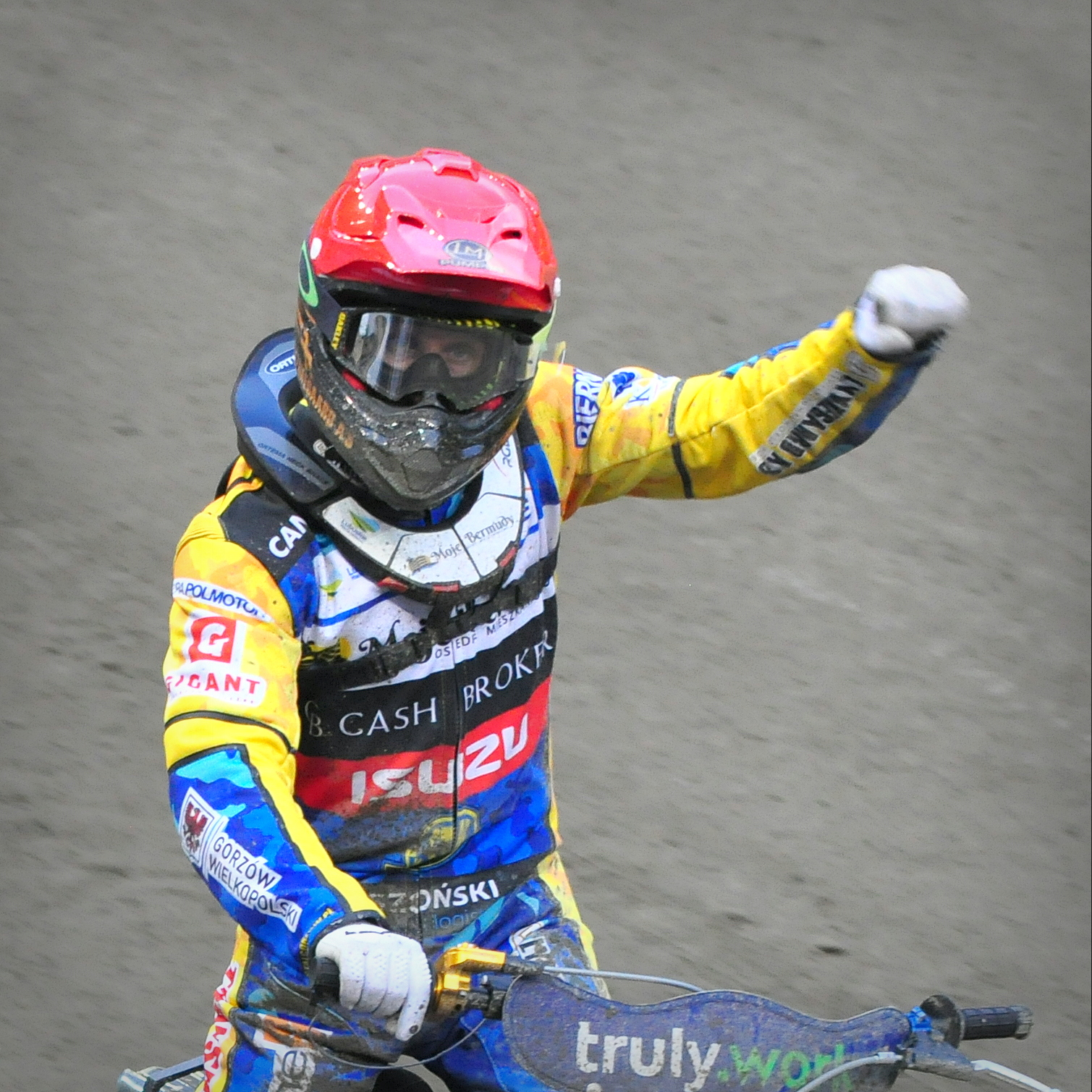
- Born: 1 January 1994 (age 32); Odense, Denmark
- Nationality: Danish

Career history

Denmark
- 2012, 2014, 2017–2019: Fjelsted
- 2013, 2015–2016: Munkebo
- 2021–2025: SES

Great Britain
- 2013–2014: Glasgow
- 2015–2016: Peterborough

Poland
- 2019–2025: Gorzów

Sweden
- 2016: Lejonen
- 2018–2019: Indianerna

Speedway Grand Prix statistics
- SGP number: 105
- Starts: 46
- Finalist: 4 times
- Winner: 2 times

Individual honours
- 2020, 2021, 2024: Danish Champion

Anders Thomsen (born 1 January 1994) is an international speedway rider from Denmark and a triple Danish champion.

== Speedway career ==
Thomsen became champion of Denmark, winning the Danish Championship in 2020. He rode in the second tier of British Speedway from 2013–2016, riding for Glasgow Tigers and Peterborough Panthers. In 2020, he won a bronze medal at the 2020 Speedway of Nations and in 2021, he won the Danish title for the second time and was awarded a permanent wildcard for the 2021 Speedway Grand Prix.

In 2022, ten days after a serious injury in a Danish speedway meeting, Thomsen claimed his first Grand Prix victory in Gorzow, Poland, beating Martin Vaculík, Bartosz Zmarzlik, and Patryk Dudek in the final. He eventually finished in 14th place during the 2022 Speedway World Championship, after securing 51 points, which included winning the Gorzów Grand Prix but another injury (a broken leg in the GP Challenge curtailed his season and he was unable to compete in the final four Grand Prix events. Despite the latest injury, Thomsen was selected as a permanent rider for the 2023 Speedway Grand Prix. Also in 2022, he helped SES win the 2022 Danish Super League.

In 2023, Thomsen was part of the Danish team that won the bronze medal in the 2023 Speedway World Cup final. During the 2023 Latvian Grand Prix, Thomsen remarkably avoided serious injuries despite being thrown over the air fence in a crash. He suffered a hand injury which required an operation and he missed the final three rounds of the 2023 Speedway Grand Prix.

In 2024, Thomsen helped Denmark reach the final of the 2024 Speedway of Nations in Manchester. Thomsen ended his 2024 season by qualifying for the 2025 Speedway Grand Prix by finishing second in the 2025 GP Challenge. In 2025, he finished 11th in the World Championship.

== Major results ==
=== World individual Championship ===
- 2016 Speedway Grand Prix – 22th (5 pts)
- 2020 Speedway Grand Prix – 18th (10 pts)
- 2021 Speedway Grand Prix – 11th (73 pts)
- 2022 Speedway Grand Prix – 14th (51 pts)
- 2023 Speedway Grand Prix – 15th (36 pts)
- 2024 Speedway Grand Prix – 21st (7 pts)
- 2025 Speedway Grand Prix – 11th (66 pts)
- 2026 Speedway Grand Prix – 11th (62 pts)

=== Grand Prix wins ===
- 1: 2022 Speedway Grand Prix of Poland (Gorzów)
- 2: 2026 Speedway Grand Prix of Sweden

=== World team Championships ===
- 2020 Speedway of Nations – 3rd
- 2023 Speedway World Cup – 3rd
- 2024 Speedway of Nations – 6th
- 2026 Speedway World Cup – 2nd
