= 2014 Speedway Grand Prix of Sweden =

Speedway Grand Prix event

- Venue: G&B Stadium
- Location: Målilla
- Start date: 14 June
- Competitors: 16 (2 reserves)

The 2014 FIM Speedway Grand Prix of Sweden was the fifth round of the 2014 Speedway Grand Prix season (the World Championship).

The event took place on 14 June at the G&B Stadium in Målilla, Sweden.

The round was the 20th Speedway Grand Prix of Sweden.

The Grand Prix was won by the English rider Tai Woffinden (which was his third career Grand Prix win).

== Grand Prix result ==
Placing	Rider	1	2	3	4	5	6	7	8	9	10	11	12	13	14	15	16	17	18	19	20	Pts	SF1	SF2	Final	GP Pts
1	(United Kingdom) (8) Tai Woffinden		3						1			2			3			2				11	3		3	17
2	(United States) (11) Greg Hancock			1				3		3					2						3	12	2		2	16
3	(Australia) (3) Chris Holder	2						2				3				2				3		12		2	1	15
4	(Poland) (10) Jarosław Hampel			3			1						3			3		0				10		3	0	13
5	(Denmark) (16) Niels Kristian Iversen				3				3	1						f			3			10	1			11
6	(Slovenia) (15) Matej Žagar				2			1			2						3	1				9		1		10
7	(Denmark) (1) Nicki Pedersen	1				3				2				2				3				11		x		11
8	(Denmark) (4) Kenneth Bjerre	3							2				2				1				2	10	0			10
9	(Sweden) (12) Peter Ljung			2					0		3			1						1		7				7
10	(Australia) (9) Darcy Ward			0		2						1					2		1			6				6
11	(Australia) (7) Troy Batchelor		0					0					0	3					2			5				5
12	(Sweden) (13) Freddie Lindgren				0	1							1		1					2		5				5
13	(United Kingdom) (14) Chris Harris				1		3					0		0							1	5				5
14	(Sweden) (6) Andreas Jonsson		2				2			0							0			0		4				4
15	(Germany) (5) Martin Smolinski		1			t					1					1					0	3				3
16	(Poland) (2) Krzysztof Kasprzak	t					0				0				e				0			0				0
R1	(Sweden) (R1) Linus Sundström	0																				0	R1			
R2	(Sweden) (R2) Dennis Andersson					0																0	R2			

m - exclusion for exceeding two minute time allowance • t - exclusion for touching the tapes • x - other exclusion • e - retired or mechanical failure • f - fell • ns - non-starter • nc - non-classify

gate A - inside	gate B	gate C	gate D - outside
