= 2014 Speedway Grand Prix of Finland =

Speedway Grand Prix event

- Venue: Ratina Stadium
- Location: Tampere (Finland)
- Start date: 17 May 2014
- Competitors: 16 (2 reserves)

The 2014 Speedway Grand Prix of Finland was the third round of the 2014 Speedway Grand Prix season (the world championship). It took place on 17 May at the Ratina Stadium in Tampere, Finland.

It was the second time that the Speedway Grand Prix of Finland had been held.

The Grand Prix was by the Slovenian rider Matej Žagar (his first career Grand Prix win).

== Grand Prix result ==
Placing	Rider	1	2	3	4	5	6	7	8	9	10	11	12	13	14	15	16	17	18	19	20	Pts	SF1	SF2	Final	GP Pts
1	(Slovenia) (5) Matej Žagar		3			1					2					3					1	10		2	3	15
2	(United Kingdom) (13) Tai Woffinden				3	2							3		0					3		11	3		2	16
3	(Sweden) (15) Freddie Lindgren				2			2			f						3	2				9	2		1	12
4	(United States) (1) Greg Hancock	e				0				3				3				3				9		3	0	12
5	(Australia) (4) Troy Batchelor	3							1				1				1				3	9	1			10
6	(Germany) (16) Martin Smolinski				1				3	0						2			2			8		1		9
7	(Australia) (9) Chris Holder			3		3						2					2		0			10		0		10
8	(Denmark) (7) Nicki Pedersen		1					3					2	1					3			10	0			10
9	(Australia) (12) Darcy Ward			1					2		1			2						2		8				8
10	(Sweden) (10) Andreas Jonsson			2			3						0			1		1				7				7
11	(Poland) (2) Jarosław Hampel	1					1				3				1				1			7				7
12	(Denmark) (11) Niels Kristian Iversen			0				0		2					2						2	6				6
13	(Finland) (8) Joonas Kylmäkorpi		2						0			0			3			0				5				5
14	(United Kingdom) (3) Chris Harris	2						1				1				0				0		4				4
15	(Denmark) (14) Kenneth Bjerre				0		e					3		0							0	3				3
16	(Poland) (6) Krzysztof Kasprzak		ns				ns			ns							ns			ns		0				0
R1	(Finland) (R1) Kauko Nieminen		0				2			1							0			1		4	R1			
R2	(Finland) (R2) Juha Hautamaki																					0	R2			

m - exclusion for exceeding two minute time allowance • t - exclusion for touching the tapes • x - other exclusion • e - retired or mechanical failure • f - fell • ns - non-starter • nc - non-classify

gate A - inside	gate B	gate C	gate D - outside
