= 2014 Speedway Grand Prix of Europe =

Speedway Grand Prix event

- Venue: Polonia Bydgoszcz Stadium
- Location: Bydgoszcz (Poland)
- Start date: 26 April 2014
- Competitors: 16 (2 reserves)

The 2014 Speedway Grand Prix of Europe was the second round of the 2014 Speedway Grand Prix season (the world championship). It took place on 28 April at the Polonia Bydgoszcz Stadium in Bydgoszcz, Poland.

It was the 14th and last time that the Speedway Grand Prix of Europe had been held, effectively being replaced by additional Grand Prix events in Poland from the 2015 season.

The Grand Prix was by the Polish rider Krzysztof Kasprzak (his first career Grand Prix win).

== Grand Prix result ==
Placing	Rider	1	2	3	4	5	6	7	8	9	10	11	12	13	14	15	16	17	18	19	20	Pts	SF1	SF2	Final	GP Pts
1	(Poland) (4) Krzysztof Kasprzak	3							3				3				1				3	13	2		3	18
2	(Australia) (16) Darcy Ward				2				1	3						3			3			12		2	2	16
3	(Poland) (13) Jarosław Hampel				3	1							2		3					1		10	3		1	14
4	(United States) (5) Greg Hancock		3			3					3					2					2	13		3	0	16
5	(Australia) (12) Chris Holder			1					2		2			3						2		10		1		11
6	(Sweden) (6) Andreas Jonsson		1				3			2							3			0		9	1			10
7	(Denmark) (9) Niels Kristian Iversen			2		2						2					2		2			10	0			10
8	(Germany) (15) Martin Smolinski				1			3			1						0	2				7		0		7
9	(Slovenia) (7) Matej Žagar		2					0					1	2					1			6				6
10	(United Kingdom) (8) Tai Woffinden		0						0			1			1			3				5				5
11	(Denmark) (3) Nicki Pedersen	0						1				f				1				3		5				5
12	(Sweden) (2) Freddie Lindgren	2					1				0				2				0			5				5
13	(Poland) (10) Adrian Miedziński			3			2						f			f		0				5				5
14	(Australia) (14) Troy Batchelor				0		0					3		1							0	4				4
15	(Denmark) (11) Kenneth Bjerre			0				2		1					0						1	4				4
16	(United Kingdom) (1) Chris Harris	1				0				0				0				1				2				2
R1	(Poland) (R1) Paweł Przedpełski																					0	R1			
R2	(Poland) (R2) Szymon Woźniak																					0	R2			

m - exclusion for exceeding two minute time allowance • t - exclusion for touching the tapes • x - other exclusion • e - retired or mechanical failure • f - fell • ns - non-starter • nc - non-classify

gate A - inside	gate B	gate C	gate D - outside
