= 2014 Speedway Grand Prix of Czech Republic =

Speedway Grand Prix event

- Venue: Markéta Stadium
- Location: Prague (Czech Republic)
- Start date: 31 May 2014
- Competitors: 16 (2 reserves)

The 2014 Speedway Grand Prix of Czech Republic was the fourth round of the 2014 Speedway Grand Prix season (the world championship). It took place on 31 May at the Markéta Stadium in Prague, Czech Republic.

It was the 18th time that the Speedway Grand Prix of Czech Republic had been held.

The Grand Prix was by the English rider Tai Woffinden (his second career Grand Prix win).

== Grand Prix result ==
Placing	Rider	1	2	3	4	5	6	7	8	9	10	11	12	13	14	15	16	17	18	19	20	Pts	SF1	SF2	Final	GP Pts
1	(United Kingdom) (7) Tai Woffinden		3					3					1	2					3			12		3	3	18
2	(United States) (16) Greg Hancock				3				0	2						3			0			8		2	2	12
3	(Slovenia) (13) Matej Žagar				2	3							2		3					2		12	3		1	16
4	(Denmark) (8) Nicki Pedersen		2						2			3			0			1				8	2		0	10
5	(Australia) (12) Darcy Ward			3					3		3			3						3		15	1			16
6	(Denmark) (1) Niels Kristian Iversen	3				2				3				1				3				12		1		13
7	(Australia) (14) Chris Holder				1		3					1		0							3	8	0			8
8	(Sweden) (9) Freddie Lindgren			1		0						2					3		2			8		0		8
9	(Poland) (4) Krzysztof Kasprzak	1							1				3				2				e	7				7
10	(Sweden) (2) Andreas Jonsson	2					0				2				2				1			7				7
11	(United Kingdom) (5) Chris Harris		e			1					1					2					2	6				6
12	(Germany) (10) Martin Smolinski			2			1						0			1		2				6				6
13	(Denmark) (6) Kenneth Bjerre		1				2			0							1			0		4				4
14	(Australia) (11) Troy Batchelor			0				x		1					1						1	3				3
15	(Poland) (3) Jarosław Hampel	0						1				0				0				1		2				2
16	(Czech Republic) (15) Václav Milík Jr.				0			2			0						0	0				2				2
R1	(Czech Republic) (R1) Zdeněk Holub																					0	R1			
R2	(Czech Republic) (R2) Michal Skurla																					0	R2			

m - exclusion for exceeding two minute time allowance • t - exclusion for touching the tapes • x - other exclusion • e - retired or mechanical failure • f - fell • ns - non-starter • nc - non-classify

gate A - inside	gate B	gate C	gate D - outside
