= 2014 Speedway Grand Prix of New Zealand =

Speedway Grand Prix event

- Venue: Western Springs Stadium
- Location: Auckland (New Zealand)
- Start date: 5 April 2014
- Competitors: 16 (2 reserves)

The 2014 Speedway Grand Prix of New Zealand was the first round of the 2014 Speedway Grand Prix season (the world championship). It took place on 5 April at the Western Springs Stadium in Auckland, New Zealand.

It was the third time that the Speedway Grand Prix of New Zealand had been held.

The Grand Prix was by the German rider Martin Smolinski (his first career Grand Prix win).

== Grand Prix result ==
| Placing | Rider | 1 | 2 | 3 | 4 | 5 | 6 | 7 | 8 | 9 | 10 | 11 | 12 | 13 | 14 | 15 | 16 | 17 | 18 | 19 | 20 | Pts | SF1 | SF2 | Final | GP Pts |
|---|---|---|---|---|---|---|---|---|---|---|---|---|---|---|---|---|---|---|---|---|---|---|---|---|---|---|
| 1 | (Germany) (11) Martin Smolinski | | | 2 | | | | 3 | | 3 | | | | | x | | | | | | 2 | 10 | | 2 | 3 | 15 |
| 2 | (Denmark) (8) Nicki Pedersen | | 3 | | | | | | 3 | | | 3 | | | 3 | | | 3 | | | | 15 | 2 | | 2 | 19 |
| 3 | (Poland) (13) Krzysztof Kasprzak | | | | 3 | 3 | | | | | | | 3 | | 2 | | | | | 2 | | 13 | | 3 | 1 | 17 |
| 4 | (Sweden) (12) Freddie Lindgren | | | 1 | | | | | 2 | | 3 | | | 1 | | | | | | 3 | | 10 | 3 | | 0 | 13 |
| 5 | (Australia) (7) Chris Holder | | 2 | | | | | 2 | | | | | 2 | 3 | | | | | 1 | | | 10 | 1 | | | 11 |
| 6 | (Denmark) (3) Kenneth Bjerre | 3 | | | | | | 1 | | | | 2 | | | | 3 | | | | 1 | | 10 | | 1 | | 11 |
| 7 | (Poland) (14) Jarosław Hampel | | | | 1 | | 1 | | | | | 1 | | 2 | | | | | | | 3 | 8 | 0 | | | 8 |
| 8 | (Sweden) (15) Andreas Jonsson | | | | 2 | | | 0 | | | 2 | | | | | | 1 | 2 | | | | 7 | | 0 | | 7 |
| 9 | (United Kingdom) (16) Tai Woffinden | | | | 0 | | | | 1 | 2 | | | | | | 2 | | | 2 | | | 7 | | | | 7 |
| 10 | (United States) (9) Greg Hancock | | | 0 | | 0 | | | | | | 0 | | | | | 3 | | 3 | | | 6 | | | | 6 |
| 11 | (Slovenia) (6) Matej Žagar | | 0 | | | | 3 | | | 1 | | | | | | | 2 | | | 0 | | 6 | | | | 6 |
| 12 | (Denmark) (10) Niels Kristian Iversen | | | 3 | | | 0 | | | | | | 1 | | | 1 | | 1 | | | | 6 | | | | 6 |
| 13 | (Australia) (2) Darcy Ward | 2 | | | | | 2 | | | | x | | | | 1 | | | | ns | | | 5 | | | | 5 |
| 14 | (Australia) (5) Troy Batchelor | | 1 | | | 2 | | | | | f | | | | | 0 | | | | | 1 | 4 | | | | 4 |
| 15 | (New Zealand) (1) Jason Bunyan | 1 | | | | 1 | | | | 0 | | | | 0 | | | | 0 | | | | 2 | | | | 2 |
| 16 | (United Kingdom) (4) Chris Harris | 0 | | | | | | | 0 | | | | 0 | | | | f | | | | 0 | 0 | | | | 0 |
| R1 | (New Zealand) (R1) Andrew Aldridge | | | | | | | | | | | | | | | | | | 0 | | | 0 | R1 | | | |
| R2 | (New Zealand) (R2) Grant Tregoning | | | | | | | | | | | | | | | | | | | | | 0 | R2 | | | |

m - exclusion for exceeding two minute time allowance • t - exclusion for touching the tapes • x - other exclusion • e - retired or mechanical failure • f - fell • ns - non-starter • nc - non-classify

| gate A - inside | gate B | gate C | gate D - outside |
