= 2014 Speedway Grand Prix of Latvia =

Speedway Grand Prix event

- Venue: Stadium Lokomotīve
- Location: Daugavpils (Latvia)
- Start date: 17 August 2014
- Competitors: 16 (2 reserves)

The 2014 Speedway Grand Prix of Latvia sponsored by Rietumu Bank, was the eighth round of the 2014 Speedway Grand Prix season (the world championship). It took place on 17 August at the Stadium Lokomotīve in Daugavpils, Latvia.

It was the sixth time that the Speedway Grand Prix of Latvia had been held.

The Grand Prix was by the Polish rider Krzysztof Kasprzak (his second career Grand Prix win). Darcy Ward failed a pre-meeting alcohol breath test before the event and received an immediate ban.

== Grand Prix result ==
Placing	Rider	1	2	3	4	5	6	7	8	9	10	11	12	13	14	15	16	17	18	19	20	Pts	SF1	SF2	Final	GP Pts
1	(Poland) (10) Krzysztof Kasprzak			3			2						2			3		2				12		2	3	17
2	(Denmark) (7) Nicki Pedersen		2					2					3	3					3			13	3		2	18
3	(United States) (2) Greg Hancock	3					1				3				3				2			12		3	1	16
4	(Denmark) (8) Kenneth Bjerre		3						0			1			2			3				9	2		0	11
5	(Slovenia) (4) Matej Žagar	1							2				1				3				1	8	1			9
6	(Latvia) (15) Kjasts Puodžuks (R1)				2			3			1						2	1				9		1		10
7	(Australia) (5) Troy Batchelor		1			1					2					2					2	8		0		8
8	(United Kingdom) (6) Tai Woffinden		0				3			1							1			3		8	0			8
9	(Denmark) (1) Niels Kristian Iversen	0				3				2				2				e				7				7
10	(Sweden) (9) Freddie Lindgren			1		2						3					0		0			6				6
11	(Germany) (3) Martin Smolinski	2						1				0				1				2		6				6
12	(Sweden) (14) Andreas Jonsson				0		0					2		1							3	6				6
13	(Australia) (11) Chris Holder			2				0		3					1						0	6				6
14	(Poland) (13) Jarosław Hampel				3	0							0		0					1		4				4
15	(United Kingdom) (12) Chris Harris			0					3		0			0						e		3				3
16	(Latvia) (16) Andžejs Ļebedevs				1				1	0						0			1			3				3
17	(Australia) (15) Darcy Ward																					0				0
R2	(Latvia) (R2) Vjačeslavs Giruckis																					0	R2			

m - exclusion for exceeding two minute time allowance • t - exclusion for touching the tapes • x - other exclusion • e - retired or mechanical failure • f - fell • ns - non-starter • nc - non-classify

gate A - inside	gate B	gate C	gate D - outside
