= 2014 Speedway Grand Prix of Denmark =

Speedway Grand Prix event

- Venue: Parken Stadium
- Location: Copenhagen
- Start date: 28 June
- Competitors: 16 (2 reserves)

The 2014 FIM Speedway Grand Prix of Denmark was the sixth round of the 2014 Speedway Grand Prix season (the World Championship).

The event took place on 28 June at the Parken Stadium in Copenhagen.

The round was the 20th Speedway Grand Prix of Denmark.

The Grand Prix was won by the Danish rider Niels Kristian Iversen (which was his third career Grand Prix win).

== Grand Prix result ==
Placing	Rider	1	2	3	4	5	6	7	8	9	10	11	12	13	14	15	16	17	18	19	20	Pts	SF1	SF2	Final	GP Pts
1	(Denmark) (10) Niels Kristian Iversen			3			3						1			3		1				11		2	3	16
2	(Australia) (13) Troy Batchelor				3	3							3		3					3		15	3		2	20
3	(United States) (15) Greg Hancock				2			0			2						1	3				8	2		1	11
4	(Denmark) (1) Peter Kildemand	3				2				2				3				2				12		3	0	15
5	(United Kingdom) (9) Tai Woffinden			1		0						1					3		3			8		1		9
6	(Australia) (8) Darcy Ward		1						3			2			2			0				8	1			9
7	(Poland) (14) Jarosław Hampel				1		2					3		1							3	10	0			10
8	(Denmark) (7) Michael Jepsen Jensen		2					2					2	2					0			8		0		8
9	(Poland) (11) Krzysztof Kasprzak			2				1		3					0						1	7				7
10	(Slovenia) (3) Matej Žagar	1						3				0				1				2		7				7
11	(Sweden) (5) Andreas Jonsson		3			1					0					0					2	6				6
12	(Denmark) (2) Nicki Pedersen	0					1				1				1				2			5				5
13	(Germany) (16) Martin Smolinski				0				1	1						2			1			5				5
14	(Sweden) (4) Freddie Lindgren	2							2				0				0				0	4				4
15	(Denmark) (12) Kenneth Bjerre			0					t		3			0						0		3				3
16	(United Kingdom) (6) Chris Harris		0				0			0							2			1		3				3
R1	(Denmark) (R1) Mikkel Michelsen								0													0	R1			
R2	(Denmark) (R2) Mikkel Bech																					0	R2			

m - exclusion for exceeding two minute time allowance • t - exclusion for touching the tapes • x - other exclusion • e - retired or mechanical failure • f - fell • ns - non-starter • nc - non-classify

gate A - inside	gate B	gate C	gate D - outside
