= 2008 Speedway Grand Prix =

14th season in the Speedway Grand Prix

Season details
- Dates: April 26 - October 18
- Events: 11
- Cities: 10
- Countries: 8
- Riders: 15 permanents 1 wild card(s); 2 track reserves
- Heats: 253 + 1 Super Prix (in 11 events)

Winners
- Champion: DEN Nicki Pedersen
- Runner-up: AUS Jason Crump
- 3rd place: POL Tomasz Gollob

The 2008 Speedway Grand Prix was the 63rd edition of the official World Championship and the 14th season in the Speedway Grand Prix used to determine the Speedway World Champion. It was the second under the promotion of IMG.

== Event format ==
The format for 2008 was the same as that used in 2007 with 16 riders taking part in each Grand Prix. Over the course of 20 heats each rider raced against every other rider once. The top eight scorers advanced to a semi-final and from each semi-final the first and second placed riders advanced to the GP final.

All rides count towards Grand Prix points totals, including the semi-final and final, which counts double (6-4-2-0) and therefore the maximum points for a single Grand Prix is 24 (five heat wins, semi final win and final win). This format means that the winner of each Grand Prix may not be the rider who scores most GP points from each race.

== Qualification ==
For the 2008 season, there were 15 permanent riders who were joined at each Grand Prix by one wild card and two track reserves.

=== 2007 Grand Prix ===
The top eight riders from the 2007 championship qualified as of right. These eight qualifiers were, in championship order:

- (1) (Denmark) Nicki Pedersen
- (2) (Australia) Leigh Adams
- (3) (Australia) Jason Crump
- (4) (Poland) Tomasz Gollob
- (5) (Denmark) Hans Andersen
- (6) (United States) Greg Hancock
- (7) (Poland) Rune Holta
- (8) (United Kingdom) Scott Nicholls

=== Grand Prix Challenge ===
The top eight riders from 2007 were joined by three riders who qualified via the Grand Prix Challenge. These riders were, in order by qualifying position:

- (12) (Denmark) Niels Kristian Iversen
- (13) (Czech Republic) Lukáš Dryml
- (11) (Denmark) Bjarne Pedersen

=== Nominations ===
The final four riders were nominated by series promoters, Benfield Sports International, following the completion of the 2007 season.

- (9) (United Kingdom) Chris Harris (British SGP Winner)
- (10) (Sweden) Andreas Jonsson (Danish and German SGP Winner)
- (14) (Poland) Krzysztof Kasprzak (2nd in Polish SGP and SWC Winner)
- (15) (Sweden) Fredrik Lindgren (3rd in Swedish SGP)

== 2008 Riders ==
No	Rider	DOB	Age	2008 Clubs				
No	Rider	DOB	Age	(United Kingdom) British	(Poland) Polish	(Sweden) Swedish	(Denmark) Danish	Others
1	(Denmark) DEN Nicki Pedersen	1977-04-02	31		Częstochowa	Lejonen	Holsted	Togliatti (RUS)
2	(Australia) AUS Leigh Adams	1971-04-28	37	Swindon	Leszno	Masarna		
3	(Australia) AUS Jason Crump	1975-08-06	33	Belle Vue	Wrocław	Vetlanda		
4	(Poland) POL Tomasz Gollob	1971-04-11	37		Gorzów Wlkp.	Västervik		
5	(Denmark) DEN Hans Andersen	1980-11-03	28	Coventry	Toruń	Dackarna	Fjelsted	
6	(United States) USA Greg Hancock	1970-06-03	38		Częstochowa	Rospiggarna		
7	(Poland) POL Rune Holta	1973-08-29	35		Gorzów Wlkp.	Vetlanda	Grindsted	
8	(United Kingdom) GBR Scott Nicholls	1978-05-16	30	Eastbourne	Rzeszów	Hammarby		
9	(United Kingdom) GBR Chris Harris	1982-11-28	26	Coventry	Ostrów	Västervik		
10	(Sweden) SWE Andreas Jonsson	1980-09-03	28	Lakeside	Bydgoszcz	Dackarna		
11	(Denmark) DEN Bjarne Pedersen	1978-07-12	30	Poole	Gdańsk	Västervik	Holstebro	
12	(Denmark) DEN Niels Kristian Iversen	1982-05-20	26	Wolverhampton	Zielona Góra	Västervik	Holsted	
13	(Czech Republic) CZE Lukáš Dryml	1981-04-16	27	Peterborough	Ostrów Wlkp.	Dackarna		Pardubice (CZE)
14	(Poland) POL Krzysztof Kasprzak	1984-07-18	24	Poole	Leszno	Smederna		
15	(Sweden) SWE Fredrik Lindgren	1985-09-15	23	Wolverhampton	Zielona Góra	Dackarna		Pardubice (CZE)

== Cities ==
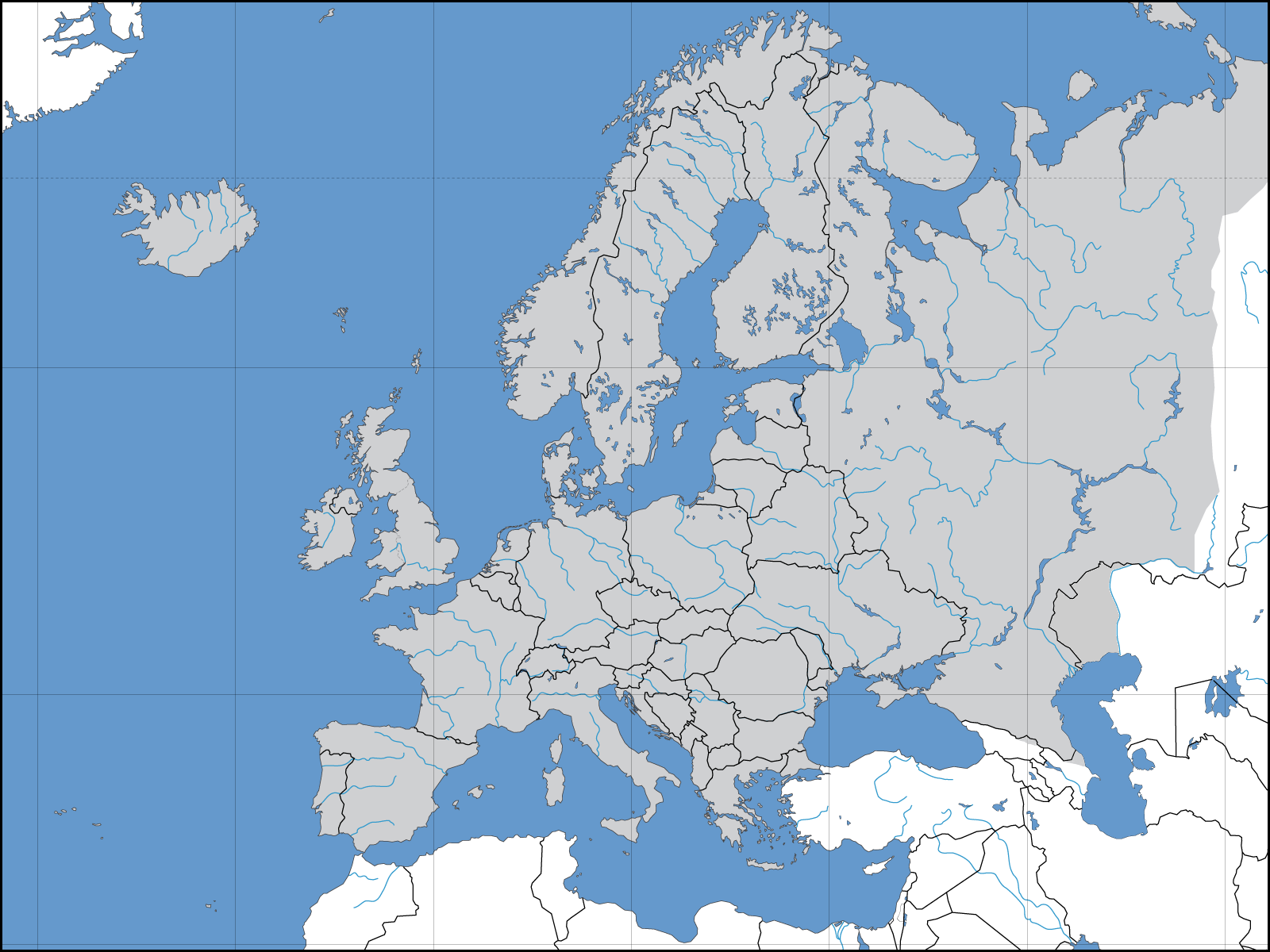

- Bydgoszcz
- Cardiff
- Copenhagen
- Daugavpils
- Gelsenkirchen
- Gothenburg
- Krško
- Leszno
- Lonigo
- Målilla
- Prague

== Calendar ==
Round	Date	City and venue	Winner	Runner-up	3rd placed	4th placed	Results
1	April 26	(Slovenia) Krško , Slovenia; Matija Gubec Stadium	(Poland) Tomasz Gollob	(Denmark) Nicki Pedersen	(Denmark) Hans N. Andersen	(Sweden) Andreas Jonsson	results
2	May 10	Leszno , Poland; Alfred Smoczyk Stadium	(Australia) Leigh Adams	(United States) Greg Hancock	(Denmark) Nicki Pedersen	(Poland) Jarosław Hampel	results
3	May 24	(Sweden) Gothenburg , Sweden; Ullevi	(Poland) Rune Holta	(Sweden) Fredrik Lindgren	(Denmark) Nicki Pedersen	(Australia) Jason Crump	results
4	June 14	(Denmark) Copenhagen , Denmark; Parken Stadium	(Poland) Tomasz Gollob	(Denmark) Nicki Pedersen	(Australia) Jason Crump	(Denmark) Hans N. Andersen	results
5	June 28	(United Kingdom) Cardiff , Great Britain; Millennium Stadium	(Australia) Jason Crump	(United States) Greg Hancock	(Denmark) Nicki Pedersen	(United Kingdom) Scott Nicholls	results
6	August 2	(Czech Republic) Prague , Czech Republic; Markéta Stadium	(Denmark) Nicki Pedersen	(Denmark) Hans N. Andersen	(Australia) Jason Crump	(United States) Greg Hancock	results
7	August 16	Målilla , Sweden; G&B Stadium	(Australia) Leigh Adams	(Denmark) Hans N. Andersen	(Denmark) Nicki Pedersen	(Australia) Jason Crump	results
8	August 30	(Latvia) Daugavpils , Latvia; Latvijas Spīdveja Centrs	(Australia) Jason Crump	(Denmark) Nicki Pedersen	(Poland) Tomasz Gollob	(United States) Greg Hancock	results
9	September 13	(Poland) Bydgoszcz , Poland; Polonia Stadium	(United States) Greg Hancock	(Denmark) Nicki Pedersen	(Poland) Tomasz Gollob	(United Kingdom) Scott Nicholls	results
10	September 27	(Italy) Lonigo , Italy; Santa Marina Stadium	(Denmark) Hans N. Andersen	(Denmark) Bjarne Pedersen	(Australia) Jason Crump	(Australia) Leigh Adams	results
11	October 18	(Germany) Gelsenkirchen , Germany; Veltins-Arena (Poland) Bydgoszcz, Poland; Polonia Stadium	(Poland) Tomasz Gollob	(Denmark) Hans N. Andersen	(United States) Greg Hancock	(Australia) Leigh Adams	results

== The Final Classification ==
Qualifies for next season's Grand Prix series
Full-time Grand Prix rider
Wild card, track reserve or qualified reserve

Pos.	Rider	Points	SVN (Slovenia)	EUR (Poland)	SWE (Sweden)	DEN (Denmark)	GBR (United Kingdom)	CZE (Czech Republic)	SCA (Sweden)	LAT (Latvia)	POL (Poland)	ITA (Italy)	GER (Germany)
Gold	(Denmark) (1) Nicki Pedersen	174	17	16	16	20	11	22	14	18	21	6	13
Silver	(Australia) (3) Jason Crump	152	10	8	12	18	22	17	12	19	9	18	7
Bronze	(Poland) (4) Tomasz Gollob	148	19	12	8	19	4	12	8	16	20	9	21
4	(United States) (6) Greg Hancock	144	8	20	6	10	20	13	12	13	18	9	15
5	(Denmark) (5) Hans N. Andersen	139	14	6	8	11	9	16	20	7	10	21	17
6	(Australia) (2) Leigh Adams	125	5	20	9	8	7	10	21	9	9	12	15
7	(Sweden) (10) Andreas Jonsson	100	12	9	8	9	8	9	6	10	8	9	12
8	(Poland) (7) Rune Holta	80	5	4	17	7	6	9	5	4	6	10	7
9	(United Kingdom) (8) Scott Nicholls	77	7	2	7	7	12	6	4	7	10	8	7
10	(Sweden) (15) Fredrik Lindgren	73	7	7	22	3	2	4	7	7	0	5	9
11	(Denmark) (11) Bjarne Pedersen	69	4	–	–	7	14	7	6	7	4	17	3
12	(Denmark) (12) Niels Kristian Iversen	59	8	10	2	6	6	7	9	1	4	6	ns
13	(United Kingdom) (9) Chris Harris	58	6	6	5	3	10	7	3	9	5	ns	4
14	(Poland) (14) Krzysztof Kasprzak	57	6	3	5	3	4	1	9	7	6	8	5
15	(Czech Republic) (13) Lukáš Dryml	47	9	2	3	1	1	4	5	7	3	4	8
16	(Poland) (16) Jarosław Hampel	16	–	16	–	–	–	–	–	–	–	–	–
17	(Denmark) (16) Kenneth Bjerre	11	–	–	–	11	–	–	–	–	–	–	–
18	(Poland) (16) Wiesław Jaguś	9	–	–	–	–	–	–	–	–	9	–	–
19	(Czech Republic) (16) (19) Luboš Tomíček, Jr.	8	–	3	5	–	–	0	–	–	–	–	–
20	(Slovenia) (16) Matej Žagar	7	7	–	–	–	–	–	–	–	–	–	–
21	(Sweden) (16) (17) Jonas Davidsson	7	–	–	7	–	–	–	ns	–	–	–	–
22	(United Kingdom) (16) Edward Kennett	4	–	–	–	–	4	–	–	–	–	–	–
23	(Sweden) (16) Peter Ljung	3	–	–	–	–	–	–	3	–	–	–	–
24	(Russia) (16) Grigory Laguta	2	–	–	–	–	–	–	–	2	–	–	–
25	(Italy) (17) Mattia Carpanese	2	–	–	–	–	–	–	–	–	–	2	–
26	(Sweden) (18) Billy Forsberg	2	–	–	2	–	–	–	–	–	–	–	–
27	(Denmark) (17) Nicolai Klindt	1	–	–	–	1	–	–	–	–	–	–	–
28	(Poland) (17) (18) Krzysztof Buczkowski	1	–	ns	–	–	–	–	–	–	1	–	–
29	(Poland) (17) (18) Maciej Janowski	1	–	–	–	–	–	–	–	–	ns	–	1
30	(Italy) (16) Guglielmo Franchetti	0	–	–	–	–	–	–	–	–	–	0	–
31	(Germany) (16) Martin Smolinski	0	–	–	–	–	–	–	–	–	–	–	0
32	(Sweden) (17) Sebastian Aldén	0	–	–	0	–	–	–	–	–	–	–	–
33	(Latvia) (17) Maksims Bogdanovs	0	–	–	–	–	–	–	–	0	–	–	–
34	(Italy) (18) Alessandro Milanese	0	–	–	–	–	–	–	–	–	–	0	–
35	(Poland) (18) Grzegorz Zengota	0	–	–	–	–	–	–	–	–	–	–	0
Rider(s) not classified
	(Slovenia) (17) Izak Šantej	—	ns	–	–	–	–	–	–	–	–	–	–
	(Poland) (17) Damian Baliński	—	–	ns	–	–	–	–	–	–	–	–	–
	(United Kingdom) (17) Tai Woffinden	—	–	–	–	–	ns	–	–	–	–	–	–
	(Czech Republic) (17) Adrian Rymel	—	–	–	–	–	–	ns	–	–	–	–	–
	(Slovenia) (18) Denis Štojs	—	ns	–	–	–	–	–	–	–	–	–	–
	(Denmark) (18) Patrick Hougaard	—	–	–	–	ns	–	–	–	–	–	–	–
	(United Kingdom) (18) Simon Stead	—	–	–	–	–	ns	–	–	–	–	–	–
	(Czech Republic) (18) Filip Šitera	—	–	–	–	–	–	ns	–	–	–	–	–
	(Sweden) (18) Thomas H. Jonasson	—	–	–	–	–	–	–	ns	–	–	–	–
	(Latvia) (18) Kasts Poudzuks	—	–	–	–	–	–	–	–	ns	–	–	–
Pos.	Rider	Points	SVN (Slovenia)	EUR (Poland)	SWE (Sweden)	DEN (Denmark)	GBR (United Kingdom)	CZE (Czech Republic)	SCA (Sweden)	LAT (Latvia)	POL (Poland)	ITA (Italy)	GER (Germany)
