= 2014 Speedway Grand Prix of Nordic =

Speedway Grand Prix event

- Venue: Vojens Speedway Center
- Location: Vojens, (Denmark)
- Start date: 13 September 2014
- Competitors: 16 (2 reserves)

The 2014 Speedway Grand Prix of Nordic was the 10th round of the 2014 Speedway Grand Prix season (the world championship). It took place on 13 September 2014 at the Vojens Speedway Center in Vojens, (Denmark).

It was the fifth and last time that the Speedway Grand Prix of Nordic had been held, effectively being replaced by additional Grand Prix events in Poland from the 2015 season.

The Grand Prix was by the Swedish rider Andreas Jonsson (his ninth career Grand Prix win).

== Grand Prix result ==
Placing	Rider	1	2	3	4	5	6	7	8	9	10	11	12	13	14	15	16	17	18	19	20	Pts	SF1	SF2	Final	GP Pts
1	(Sweden) (8) Andreas Jonsson		1						3			2			1			2				9		3	3	15
2	(Denmark) (15) Peter Kildemand				3			3			3						1	3				13	3		2	18
3	(Poland) (9) Krzysztof Kasprzak			2		3						1					0		3			9	2		1	12
4	(Australia) (14) Troy Batchelor				0		3					3		2							3	11		2	0	13
5	(Australia) (4) Chris Holder	2							1				1				3				2	9	1			10
6	(Denmark) (6) Kenneth Bjerre		2				2			3							2			1		10		e		10
7	(Sweden) (13) Freddie Lindgren				1	2							2		2					2		9	0			9
8	(Denmark) (7) Nicki Pedersen		3					1					f	3					1			8		x		8
9	(United Kingdom) (2) Tai Woffinden	t					0				2				3				2			7				7
10	(Denmark) (16) Michael Jepsen Jensen				2				0	2						3			0			7				7
11	(Denmark) (12) Mikkel Bech			1					2		0			1						3		7				7
12	(Germany) (1) Martin Smolinski	3				1				1				0				1				6				6
13	(Slovenia) (11) Matej Žagar			3				2		0					0						1	6				6
14	(United Kingdom) (10) Chris Harris			0			1						3			1		x				5				5
15	(Poland) (5) Jarosław Hampel		0			0					1					2					0	3				3
16	(Denmark) (3) Nikolaj Busk Jakobsen (R1)	0						0				0				0				0		0				0
R2	(Denmark) (R2) Lasse Bjerre	1																				1	R2			

m - exclusion for exceeding two minute time allowance • t - exclusion for touching the tapes • x - other exclusion • e - retired or mechanical failure • f - fell • ns - non-starter • nc - non-classify

gate A - inside	gate B	gate C	gate D - outside
