= 2014 Speedway Grand Prix =

Speedway world championship

Season details
- Dates: 5 April – 11 October
- Events: 12
- Riders: 15 permanents 1 wild card(s); 2 track reserves
- Heats: 276 (in 12 events)

Winners
- Champion: USA Greg Hancock
- Runner-up: POL Krzysztof Kasprzak
- 3rd place: DEN Nicki Pedersen

The 2014 Speedway Grand Prix season was the 69th edition of the official World Championship and the 20th season of the Speedway Grand Prix era, deciding the FIM Speedway World Championship. It was the fourteenth series under the promotion of Benfield Sports International, an IMG company. Tai Woffinden was the defending champion from 2013.

Greg Hancock won his third world title, after taking top-five placings in all but one race he contested, including a victory at the British round, in Cardiff. Hancock won the title by eight points ahead of Krzysztof Kasprzak, who was the season's most frequent winner, with three victories. Third place in the championship was decided in a run-off at the final round of the season at Torún in Poland. Three-time world champion Nicki Pedersen and defending champion Woffinden – a winner in back-to-back events in Prague and Målilla, Sweden – finished tied on points, but Pedersen clinched the position after beating Woffinden in the run-off.

Aside from Hancock, Kasprzak and Woffinden, six other riders won rounds during the season. Martin Smolinski was the winner of the opening race in Auckland; it was his first victory in the series. Like Smolinski, Slovenia's Matej Žagar was a first-time winner in the Finnish round at Tampere, en route to a fifth-place finish in the championship. Niels Kristian Iversen and Jarosław Hampel, who finished third and second behind Woffinden in 2013, each won races; Iversen won in Copenhagen while Hampel triumphed at Stockholm. Other winners were Andreas Jonsson in Vojens and Bartosz Zmarzlik, who won on a wildcard appearance, on home soil, at the Edward Jancarz Stadium.

Darcy Ward failed a pre-meeting alcohol breath test before the Latvian Grand Prix and received an immediate ban.

== Qualification ==
For the 2014 season there were 15 permanent riders, joined at each Grand Prix by one wild card and two track reserves.

The top eight riders from the 2013 championship qualified automatically. In March 2014, before the start of the season, Emil Sayfutdinov – who finished sixth in 2013 – elected not to compete in 2014 series, because he has failed to recover from serious injuries sustained the previous season. He was replaced by second substitute Troy Batchelor. Those riders were joined by three riders who qualified via the Grand Prix Challenge. Since the winner of the Grand Prix Challenge, Niels Kristian Iversen, had already qualified following his third position in the 2013 championship, fourth-placed Martin Smolinski qualified.

The final four riders were nominated by series promoters, Benfield Sports International, following the completion of the 2013 season. Early in October 2013, former world champion Tomasz Gollob accepted a nomination for the series, but later withdrew from the competition due to unforeseen developments in his sponsorship program. He was replaced by first substitute Chris Harris.

=== Qualified riders ===
#	Riders	2013 place	GP Ch place	Appearance	Previous appearances in series
1	(United Kingdom) Tai Woffinden	1	—	3rd	2010, 2011, 2013
33	(Poland) Jarosław Hampel	2	—	9th	2000–2002, 2004–2007, 2008–2009, 2010–2013
88	(Denmark) Niels Kristian Iversen	3	1	4th	2004–2005, 2006, 2008, 2009–2010, 2013
45	(United States) Greg Hancock	4	—	20th	1995–2013
5	(Denmark) Nicki Pedersen	5	—	14th	2000, 2001–2013
55	(Slovenia) Matej Žagar	7	—	4th	2003–2005, 2006–2007, 2008–2009, 2011, 2013
43	(Australia) Darcy Ward	8	—	2nd	2011, 2013
507	(Poland) Krzysztof Kasprzak	10	2	3rd	2004–2007, 2008, 2012, 2013
66	(Sweden) Fredrik Lindgren	11	—	7th	2004, 2006–2007, 2008–2013
23	(Australia) Chris Holder	12	—	5th	2010–2013
100	(Sweden) Andreas Jonsson	13	—	13th	2001, 2002–2013
91	(Denmark) Kenneth Bjerre	—	3	5th	2004–2008, 2009–2012
84	(Germany) Martin Smolinski	—	4	1st	2008
37	(United Kingdom) Chris Harris	20	5	7th	2003, 2007–2012, 2013
75	(Australia) Troy Batchelor	—	6	1st	2013

=== Qualified substitute ===
The following rider qualified as a substitute due to their result in the Grand Prix Challenge.

#	Riders	2013 place	GP Ch place
19	(Denmark) (19) Michael Jepsen Jensen	21	7

== Calendar ==
The 2014 season consisted of 12 events, just like 2013.

Round	Date	City and venue	Winner	Runner-up	3rd placed	4th placed	Results
1	5 April	(New Zealand) Auckland , New Zealand; Western Springs Stadium	(Germany) Martin Smolinski	(Denmark) Nicki Pedersen	(Poland) Krzysztof Kasprzak	(Sweden) Fredrik Lindgren	results
2	26 April	Bydgoszcz, Poland; Polonia Stadium	(Poland) Krzysztof Kasprzak	(Australia) Darcy Ward	(Poland) Jarosław Hampel	(United States) Greg Hancock	results
3	17 May	(Finland) Tampere , Finland; Tampere Stadium	(Slovenia) Matej Žagar	(United Kingdom) Tai Woffinden	(Sweden) Fredrik Lindgren	(United States) Greg Hancock	results
4	31 May	(Czech Republic) Prague , Czech Republic; Markéta Stadium	(United Kingdom) Tai Woffinden	(United States) Greg Hancock	(Slovenia) Matej Žagar	(Denmark) Nicki Pedersen	results
5	14 June	(Sweden) Målilla , Sweden; G&B Stadium	(United Kingdom) Tai Woffinden	(United States) Greg Hancock	(Australia) Chris Holder	(Poland) Jarosław Hampel	results
6	28 June	(Denmark) Copenhagen , Denmark; Parken Stadium	(Denmark) Niels Kristian Iversen	(Australia) Troy Batchelor	(United States) Greg Hancock	(Denmark) Peter Kildemand	results
7	12 July	(United Kingdom) Cardiff , Great Britain; Millennium Stadium	(United States) Greg Hancock	(United Kingdom) Tai Woffinden	(Australia) Darcy Ward	(Poland) Krzysztof Kasprzak	results
8	17 August	(Latvia) Daugavpils, Latvia; Latvijas Spīdveja Centrs	(Poland) Krzysztof Kasprzak	(Denmark) Nicki Pedersen	(United States) Greg Hancock	(Denmark) Kenneth Bjerre	results
9	30 August	(Poland) Gorzów Wielkopolski , Poland; Jancarz Stadium	(Poland) Bartosz Zmarzlik	(Slovenia) Matej Žagar	(Poland) Krzysztof Kasprzak	(Denmark) Michael Jepsen Jensen	results
10	13 September	(Denmark) Vojens , Denmark; Speedway Center	(Sweden) Andreas Jonsson	(Denmark) Peter Kildemand	(Poland) Krzysztof Kasprzak	(Australia) Troy Batchelor	results
11	27 September	Stockholm , Sweden; Friends Arena	(Poland) Jarosław Hampel	(United States) Greg Hancock	(Poland) Krzysztof Kasprzak	(Australia) Chris Holder	results
12	11 October	Toruń , Poland; Rose Motoarena	(Poland) Krzysztof Kasprzak	(Sweden) Andreas Jonsson	(Poland) Jarosław Hampel	(Denmark) Nicki Pedersen	results

== Classification ==
Qualifies for next season's Grand Prix series
Full-time Grand Prix rider
Wild card, track reserve or qualified reserve

Pos.	Rider	Points	NZL (New Zealand)	EUR (Poland)	FIN (Finland)	CZE (Czech Republic)	SWE (Sweden)	DEN (Denmark)	GBR (United Kingdom)	LAT (Latvia)	POL (Poland)	NOR (Denmark)	SCA (Sweden)	PL2 (Poland)
Gold	(United States) (45) Greg Hancock	140	6	16	12	12	16	11	14	16	9	–	15	13
Silver	(Poland) (507) Krzysztof Kasprzak	132	17	18	–	7	0	7	10	17	16	12	11	17
Bronze	(Denmark) (5) Nicki Pedersen	121	19	5	10	10	11	5	8	18	7	8	6	14
4	(United Kingdom) (1) Tai Woffinden	121	7	5	16	18	17	9	18	8	–	7	7	9
5	(Slovenia) (55) Matej Žagar	114	6	6	15	16	10	7	6	9	16	6	12	5
6	(Sweden) (100) Andreas Jonsson	103	7	10	7	7	4	6	8	6	4	15	12	17
7	(Australia) (23) Chris Holder	100	11	11	10	8	15	–	–	6	9	10	13	7
8	(Poland) (33) Jarosław Hampel	98	8	14	7	2	13	10	5	4	0	3	21	11
9	(Australia) (75) Troy Batchelor	91	4	4	10	3	5	20	3	8	9	13	6	6
10	(Sweden) (66) Fredrik Lindgren	90	13	5	12	8	5	4	10	6	6	9	9	3
11	(Denmark) (88) Niels Kristian Iversen	87	6	10	6	13	11	16	12	7	6	–	–	–
12	(Germany) (84) Martin Smolinski	81	15	7	9	6	3	5	8	6	5	6	7	4
13	(Denmark) (91) Kenneth Bjerre	79	11	4	3	4	10	3	4	11	10	10	1	8
14	(Australia) (43) Darcy Ward	75	5	16	8	16	6	9	15	–	–	–	–	–
15	(United Kingdom) (37) Chris Harris	48	0	2	4	6	5	3	6	3	6	5	4	4
16	(Denmark) (19) Michael Jepsen Jensen	42	–	–	–	–	–	8	9	–	14	7	4	–
17	(Denmark) (16) Peter Kildemand	33	–	–	–	–	–	15	–	–	–	18	–	–
18	(Poland) (16) Bartosz Zmarzlik	17	–	–	–	–	–	–	–	–	17	–	–	–
19	(Poland) (16) Adrian Miedziński	14	–	5	–	–	–	–	–	–	–	–	–	9
20	(Latvia) (17) Kjasts Puodžuks	10	–	–	–	–	–	–	–	10	–	–	–	–
21	(Sweden) (16) Thomas H. Jonasson	7	–	–	–	–	–	–	–	–	–	–	7	–
22	(Sweden) (16) Peter Ljung	7	–	–	–	–	7	–	–	–	–	–	–	–
23	(Denmark) (18) Mikkel B. Jensen	7	–	–	–	–	–	–	–	–	–	7	–	–
24	(Poland) (20) Maciej Janowski	7	–	–	–	–	–	–	–	–	–	–	–	7
25	(Finland) (16) Joonas Kylmäkorpi	5	–	–	5	–	–	–	–	–	–	–	–	–
26	(Finland) (17) Kauko Nieminen	4	–	–	4	–	–	–	–	–	–	–	–	–
27	(Poland) (17) Paweł Przedpełski	4	–	–	–	–	–	–	–	–	–	–	–	4
28	(Latvia) (16) Andžejs Ļebedevs	3	–	–	–	–	–	–	–	3	–	–	–	–
29	(Sweden) (20) Kim Nilsson	3	–	–	–	–	–	–	–	–	–	–	3	–
30	(New Zealand) (16) Jason Bunyan	2	2	–	–	–	–	–	–	–	–	–	–	–
31	(United Kingdom) (16) Craig Cook	2	–	–	–	–	–	–	2	–	–	–	–	–
32	(Czech Republic) (16) Vaclav Milik	2	–	–	–	2	–	–	–	–	–	–	–	–
33	(Poland) (17) Adrian Cyfer	2	–	–	–	–	–	–	–	–	2	–	–	–
34	(Poland) (18) Lukasz Kaczmarek	2	–	–	–	–	–	–	–	–	2	–	–	–
35	(Denmark) (18) Lasse Bjerre	1	–	–	–	–	–	–	–	–	–	1	–	–
Pos.	Rider	Points	NZL (New Zealand)	EUR (Poland)	FIN (Finland)	CZE (Czech Republic)	SWE (Sweden)	DEN (Denmark)	GBR (United Kingdom)	LAT (Latvia)	POL (Poland)	NOR (Denmark)	SCA (Sweden)	PL2 (Poland)

== See also ==
- 2014 Individual Speedway Junior World Championship
