= 2014 Speedway Grand Prix of Great Britain =

Speedway Grand Prix event

- Venue: Millennium Stadium
- Location: Cardiff (Wales)
- Start date: 12 July 2014
- Competitors: 16 (2 reserves)

The 2014 Speedway Grand Prix of Great Britain, sponsored by MITAS, was the seventh round of the 2014 Speedway Grand Prix season. It took place on 7 July at the Millennium Stadium in Cardiff, Wales.

It was the 20th Speedway Grand Prix of Great Britain.

The Speedway Grand Prix Commission nominated Craig Cook as Wild Card, and Ben Barker and Jason Garrity both as Track Reserves.

The Grand Prix was won by United States rider Greg Hancock (his 18th career Grand Prix win), who beat Tai Woffinden and Darcy Ward in the final.

== Grand Prix result ==
Placing	Rider	1	2	3	4	5	6	7	8	9	10	11	12	13	14	15	16	17	18	19	20	Pts	SF1	SF2	Final	GP Pts
1	(United States) (14) Greg Hancock				1		1					3		3							1	9	2		3	14
2	(United Kingdom) (13) Tai Woffinden				3	3							1		3					3		13	3		2	18
3	(Australia) (4) Darcy Ward	3							f				2				3				3	11		3	1	15
4	(Poland) (12) Krzysztof Kasprzak			2					1		3			1						1		8		2	0	10
5	(Denmark) (10) Niels Kristian Iversen			3			2						0			3		3				11		1		12
6	(Sweden) (8) Freddie Lindgren		1						3			2			2			1				9	1			10
7	(Denmark) (1) Michael Jepsen Jensen	2				2				3				2				0				9		f		9
8	(Germany) (16) Martin Smolinski				2				2	1						0			3			8	0			8
9	(Sweden) (2) Andreas Jonsson	1					3				2				1				1			8				8
10	(Denmark) (5) Nicki Pedersen		3			1					1					1					2	8				8
11	(Slovenia) (3) Matej Žagar	0						1				1				2				2		6				6
12	(United Kingdom) (11) Chris Harris			1				3		2					0						e	6				6
13	(Poland) (7) Jarosław Hampel		0					2					3	0					0			5				5
14	(Denmark) (15) Kenneth Bjerre				0			0			0						2	2				4				4
15	(Australia) (9) Troy Batchelor			0		0						0					1		2			3				3
16	(United Kingdom) (6) Craig Cook		2				0			0							0			0		2				2
R1	(United Kingdom) (R1) Ben Barker																					0	R1			
R2	(United Kingdom) (R2) Jason Garrity																					0	R2			

m - exclusion for exceeding two minute time allowance • t - exclusion for touching the tapes • x - other exclusion • e - retired or mechanical failure • f - fell • ns - non-starter • nc - non-classify

gate A - inside	gate B	gate C	gate D - outside

== See also ==
- motorcycle speedway
