= 2014 Speedway Grand Prix of Poland =

Speedway Grand Prix event

2014 Speedway Grand Prix of Poland I & II
- Venue: Edward Jancarz Stadium; MotoArena Toruń
- Location: Gorzów; Toruń
- Start date: 30 August; 11 October
- Competitors: 16 (2 reserves)

The 2014 FIM Speedway Grand Prix of Poland was the ninth and twelfth rounds of the 2014 Speedway Grand Prix season (the World Championship).

The ninth round took place on 30 August at the Edward Jancarz Stadium in Gorzów Wielkopolski and twelfth and final round was held on 11 October at the MotoArena Toruń in Toruń.

The rounds were the 25th to 26th Speedway Grand Prix of Poland respectively.

The Gorzów Grand Prix was won by the Polish wild card rider Bartosz Zmarzlik, which was his first career Grand Prix win. The Toruń Grand Prix was won by Krzysztof Kasprzak (his third career Grand Prix win and third of the World Championship season).

== Results ==
=== Event 1 - Gorzów Grand Prix (30 August) ===
Placing	Rider	1	2	3	4	5	6	7	8	9	10	11	12	13	14	15	16	17	18	19	20	Pts	SF1	SF2	Final	GP Pts
1	(Poland) (4) Bartosz Zmarzlik	3							2				1				3				2	11	3		3	17
2	(Slovenia) (12) Matej Žagar			3					0		2			3						3		11		3	2	16
3	(Poland) (13) Krzysztof Kasprzak				3	3							2		3					2		13	2		1	16
4	(Denmark) (16) Michael Jepsen Jensen				2				1	3						3			3			12		2	0	14
5	(Denmark) (7) Kenneth Bjerre		1					3					3	0					2			9	1			10
6	(Australia) (11) Troy Batchelor			1				2		2					2						1	8		1		9
7	(Australia) (1) Chris Holder	1				2				1				2				3				9	0			9
8	(United States) (8) Greg Hancock		3						3			3			ns			ns				9		ns		9
9	(Denmark) (6) Nicki Pedersen		2				3			e							2			f		7				7
10	(Sweden) (14) Freddie Lindgren				1		2					2		1							0	6				6
11	(Denmark) (2) Niels Kristian Iversen	2					1				3				e				ns			6				6
12	(United Kingdom) (10) Chris Harris			2			0						0			2		2				6				6
13	(Germany) (5) Martin Smolinski		0			1					1					0					3	5				5
14	(Sweden) (3) Andreas Jonsson	0						1				1				1				1		4				4
15	(Poland) (9) Adrian Cyfer (R1)			0		e						0					1		1			2				2
16	(Poland) (15) Jarosław Hampel				0			0			0						0	0				0				0
R2	(Poland) (R2) Lukasz Kaczmarek														1			1	0			2	R2			

m - exclusion for exceeding two minute time allowance • t - exclusion for touching the tapes • x - other exclusion • e - retired or mechanical failure • f - fell • ns - non-starter • nc - non-classify

gate A - inside	gate B	gate C	gate D - outside

=== Event 2 - Toruń Grand Prix (11 October) ===
Placing	Rider	1	2	3	4	5	6	7	8	9	10	11	12	13	14	15	16	17	18	19	20	Pts	SF1	SF2	Final	GP Pts
1	(Poland) (9) Krzysztof Kasprzak			2		2						2					3		3			12		2	3	17
2	(Sweden) (8) Andreas Jonsson		2						3			3			2			2				12		3	2	17
3	(Poland) (12) Jarosław Hampel			3					0		1			3						1		8	2		1	11
4	(Denmark) (2) Nicki Pedersen	2					2				3				3				1			11	3		e	14
5	(United Kingdom) (10) Tai Woffinden			1			1						0			3		3				8	1			9
6	(Poland) (11) Adrian Miedziński			e				3		2					1						2	8		1		9
7	(United States) (5) Greg Hancock		3			3					2					2					3	13	e			13
8	(Denmark) (6) Kenneth Bjerre		0				0			3							2			3		8		0		8
9	(Australia) (14) Chris Holder				2		3					1		1							0	7				7
10	(Poland) (4) Maciej Janowski	e							2				3				1				1	7				7
11	(Australia) (7) Troy Batchelor		1					1					2	2					0			6				6
12	(Slovenia) (1) Matej Žagar	3				1				1				0				0				5				5
13	(Germany) (3) Martin Smolinski	1						0				0				1				2		4				4
14	(United Kingdom) (16) Chris Harris				1				1	0						0			2			4				4
15	(Sweden) (15) Freddie Lindgren				e			2			0						0	1				3				3
16	(Denmark) (13) Michael Jepsen Jensen				ns	ns							ns		ns					ns		0				0
R1	(Poland) (R1) Paweł Przedpełski				3								1							0		4	R1			
R2	(Poland) (R2) Oskar Fajfer					0									0							0	R2			

m - exclusion for exceeding two minute time allowance • t - exclusion for touching the tapes • x - other exclusion • e - retired or mechanical failure • f - fell • ns - non-starter • nc - non-classify

gate A - inside	gate B	gate C	gate D - outside
