= 2014 Speedway Grand Prix of Scandinavia =

Speedway Grand Prix event

- Venue: Friends Arena
- Location: Stockholm, (Sweden)
- Start date: 27 September 2014
- Competitors: 16 (2 reserves)

The 2014 Speedway Grand Prix of Scandinavia was the 11th round of the 2014 Speedway Grand Prix season (the world championship). It took place on 27 September at the Friends Arena in Stockholm, (Sweden).

It was the 13th time that the Speedway Grand Prix of Scandinavia had been held.

The Grand Prix was by the Polish rider Jarosław Hampel (his sixth career Grand Prix win).

== Grand Prix result ==
Placing	Rider	1	2	3	4	5	6	7	8	9	10	11	12	13	14	15	16	17	18	19	20	Pts	SF1	SF2	Final	GP Pts
1	(Poland) (11) Jarosław Hampel			3				3		3					3						3	15	3		3	21
2	(United States) (9) Greg Hancock			0		3						2					3		3			11		2	2	15
3	(Poland) (4) Krzysztof Kasprzak	3							3				1				0				1	8	2		1	11
4	(Australia) (12) Chris Holder			2					2		3			0						3		10		3	0	13
5	(Slovenia) (1) Matej Žagar	2				1				2				3				3				11		1		12
6	(Sweden) (10) Andreas Jonsson			1			3						2			3		2				11	1			12
7	(Sweden) (13) Freddie Lindgren				2	2							3		2					0		9	0			9
8	(United Kingdom) (15) Tai Woffinden				3			2			0						2	0				7		0		7
9	(Germany) (6) Martin Smolinski		3				1			1							1			1		7				7
10	(Sweden) (7) Thomas H. Jonasson		2					1					0	2					2			7				7
11	(Denmark) (14) Nicki Pedersen				1		2					0		1							2	6				6
12	(Australia) (3) Troy Batchelor	0						0				3				1				2		6				6
13	(United Kingdom) (8) Chris Harris		1						1			1			0			1				4				4
14	(Denmark) (2) Michael Jepsen Jensen	1					0				2				1				f			4				4
15	(Sweden) (16) Kim Nilsson				0				0	0						2			1			3				3
16	(Denmark) (5) Kenneth Bjerre		0			0					1					0					f	1				1
R1	(Sweden) (R1) Oliver Berntzon																					0	R1			
R2	(Sweden) (R2) Jacob Thorssell																					0	R2			

m - exclusion for exceeding two minute time allowance • t - exclusion for touching the tapes • x - other exclusion • e - retired or mechanical failure • f - fell • ns - non-starter • nc - non-classify

gate A - inside	gate B	gate C	gate D - outside
