= Speedway Grand Prix of Scandinavia =

Speedway world championship event

(Kalmar Union) FIM Scandinavian Speedway Grand Prix
- Stadium: Skrotfrag Arena, Målilla, Sweden
- Years: 18 (2002–2019)
- Track: speedway track
- Track Length: 310 m

Last Event (season 2019)
- Date: 2019

The Speedway Grand Prix of Scandinavia was a speedway event that was a part of the Speedway Grand Prix series (the world championship).

The event ran from 2002 to 2019 until it was effectively replaced by additional Grand Prix events in Poland from the 2020 season.

== Winners ==
	Season	City	Stadium	Winner
1	2002	Gothenburg	Ullevi	(Australia) Leigh Adams	result
2	2003	Gothenburg	Ullevi	(Australia) Ryan Sullivan	result
3	2004	Gothenburg	Ullevi	(Denmark) Hans Andersen	result
4	2005	Målilla	G&B Stadium	(Australia) Jason Crump	result
5	2006	Målilla	G&B Stadium	(Sweden) Andreas Jonsson	result
6	2007	Målilla	G&B Stadium	(Australia) Leigh Adams	result
7	2008	Målilla	G&B Stadium	(Australia) Leigh Adams	result
8	2009	Målilla	G&B Stadium	(Poland) Tomasz Gollob	result
9	2010	Målilla	G&B Stadium	(Poland) Rune Holta	result
10	2011	Målilla	G&B Stadium	(Poland) Jaroslaw Hampel	result
11	2012	Målilla	G&B Stadium	(Poland) Tomasz Gollob	result
12	2013	Stockholm	Friends Arena	(Denmark) Niels Kristian Iversen	result
13	2014	Stockholm	Friends Arena	(Poland) Jaroslaw Hampel	result
14	2015	Stockholm	Friends Arena	(United Kingdom) Tai Woffinden	result
15	2016	Stockholm	Friends Arena	(Australia) Jason Doyle	result
16	2017	Stockholm	Friends Arena	(Slovenia) Matej Žagar	result
17	2018	Målilla	G&B Stadium	(Denmark) Nicki Pedersen	result
18	2019	Målilla	G&B Stadium	(Sweden) Fredrik Lindgren	result

== Most wins ==
- (Australia) Leigh Adams 3 times

== See also ==
- List of sporting events in Sweden
- Speedway Grand Prix of Sweden
