= Speedway Grand Prix of New Zealand =

Speedway event

- Stadium: Western Springs Stadium, Auckland
- Years: 3 (2012–2014)
- Track: permanent track
- Track Length: 413 m

Last Event (season 2014)
- Date: 5 April 2014
- Winner: (Germany) Martin Smolinski
- 2nd place: (Denmark) Nicki Pedersen
- 3rd place: (Poland) Krzysztof Kasprzak

The New Zealand Speedway Grand Prix was a motorcycle speedway event that formed part of the Speedway Grand Prix (the world championship). The event was held at the Western Springs Stadium in Auckland from 2012 to 2014.

Western Springs is a permanent speedway venue which generally caters to car racing such as Sprintcars and Midgets, though it has also hosted motorcycle speedway on many occasions, including 15 times as host of the New Zealand Individual Speedway Championship.

At 413 metres (452 yards) in length, Western Springs, which hosted the opening round of the SGP from 2012–2014, was one of the longest tracks used in the 25-year history of the series.

The Grand Prix of New Zealand was dropped from the 2015 Speedway Grand Prix series.

== Winners ==
	Season	City	Stadium	Winner
1	2012	Auckland	Western Springs	(United States) Greg Hancock	result
2	2013	Auckland	Western Springs	(Poland) Jaroslaw Hampel	result
3	2014	Auckland	Western Springs	(Germany) Martin Smolinski	result
