= Speedway Grand Prix of Europe =

Former round of the motorcycle speedway world championship

(Europe) European Speedway Grand Prix
- Stadium: Polonia Bydgoszcz Stadium, Bydgoszcz
- Years: 14 (2000, 2002–2014)
- Track: Speedway track
- Track Length: various m

Last Event (season 2014)
- Date: 2014

The Speedway Grand Prix of Europe was a motorcycle speedway event that was a part of the Speedway Grand Prix series (the world championship).

It was held 14 times from 2000 to 2014 before effectively being replaced by additional Grand Prix events in Poland from the 2015 season.

== Winners ==
	Season	City	Stadium	Winner
1	2000	Bydgoszcz	Polonia Stadium	(United States) Billy Hamill	result
2	2002	Chorzów	Silesia Stadium	(Denmark) Nicki Pedersen	result
3	2003	Chorzów	Silesia Stadium	(Sweden) Tony Rickardsson	result
4	2004	Wrocław	Olympic Stadium	(Denmark) Bjarne Pedersen	result
5	2005	Wrocław	Olympic Stadium	(Sweden) Tony Rickardsson	result
6	2006	Wrocław	Olympic Stadium	(Australia) Jason Crump	result
7	2007	Wrocław	Olympic Stadium	(Denmark) Nicki Pedersen	result
8	2008	Leszno	Alfred Smoczyk Stadium	(Australia) Leigh Adams	result
9	2009	Leszno	Alfred Smoczyk Stadium	(Australia) Jason Crump	result
10	2010	Leszno	Alfred Smoczyk Stadium	(Australia) Jason Crump	result
11	2011	Leszno	Alfred Smoczyk Stadium	(Denmark) Nicki Pedersen	result
12	2012	Leszno	Alfred Smoczyk Stadium	(Australia) Chris Holder	result
13	2013	Bydgoszcz	Polonia Stadium	(Russia) Emil Sayfutdinov	result
14	2014	Bydgoszcz	Polonia Stadium	(Poland) Krzysztof Kasprzak	result

== Most wins ==
- (Australia) Jason Crump 3 times
- (Denmark) Nicki Pedersen 3 times

== See also ==
- List of Speedway Grand Prix riders
