= Speedway Grand Prix of Sweden =

Round of the motorcycle speedway world championship

(Sweden) Swedish Speedway Grand Prix
- Stadium: Skrotfrag Arena, Målilla
- Years: 30 (1995–present)
- Track: Speedway track
- Track Length: 305 m

Last Event (season 2025)
- Date: 5 July 2025
- Winner: (Australia) Brady Kurtz

The Speedway Grand Prix of Sweden is a speedway event that is a part of the Speedway Grand Prix Series (the World Championship of speedway).

Since 2021 the Swedish Grand Prix has been held exclusively at the Skrotfrag Arena in Målilla.

== Winners ==
	Season	City	Stadium	Winner
1	1995	Linköping	Motorstadium	(Denmark) Tommy Knudsen	result
2	1996	Linköping	Motorstadium	(United States) Billy Hamill	result
3	1997	Linköping	Motorstadium	(Poland) Tomasz Gollob	result
4	1998	Linköping	Motorstadium	(Sweden) Tony Rickardsson	result
5	1999	Linköping	Motorstadium	(England) Mark Loram	result
6	2000	Linköping	Motorstadium	(Australia) Jason Crump	result
7	2001	Stockholm	Olympiastadion	(Australia) Jason Crump	result
8	2002	Stockholm	Olympiastadion	(Sweden) Tony Rickardsson	result
9	2003	Avesta	Stadion Brovalla	(Australia) Ryan Sullivan	result
10	2004	Stockholm	Olympiastadion	(Australia) Leigh Adams	result
11	2005	Eskilstuna	Smedstadion	(Australia) Jason Crump	result
12	2006	Eskilstuna	Smedstadion	(Australia) Jason Crump	result
13	2007	Eskilstuna	Smedstadion	(Australia) Leigh Adams	result
14	2008	Gothenburg	Ullevi	(Poland) Rune Holta	result
15	2009	Gothenburg	Ullevi	(Russia) Emil Sayfutdinov	result
16	2010	Gothenburg	Ullevi	(Denmark) Kenneth Bjerre	result
17	2011	Gothenburg	Ullevi	(Australia) Chris Holder	result
18	2012	Gothenburg	Ullevi	(Sweden) Fredrik Lindgren	result
19	2013	Gothenburg	Ullevi	(Russia) Emil Sayfutdinov	result
20	2014	Målilla	G&B Stadium	(England) Tai Woffinden	result
21	2015	Målilla	G&B Stadium	(Denmark) Nicki Pedersen	result
22	2016	Målilla	G&B Stadium	(United States) Greg Hancock	result
23	2017	Målilla	G&B Stadium	(Poland) Bartosz Zmarzlik	result
24	2018	Hallstavik	HZ Bygg Arena	(Poland) Maciej Janowski	result
25	2019	Hallstavik	HZ Bygg Arena	(Russia) Emil Sayfutdinov	result
26	2021	Målilla	Skrotfrag Arena	(Poland) Bartosz Zmarzlik	result
27	2022	Målilla	Skrotfrag Arena	(Poland) Bartosz Zmarzlik	result
28	2023	Målilla	Skrotfrag Arena	(England) Dan Bewley	result
29	2024	Målilla	Skrotfrag Arena	(Poland) Bartosz Zmarzlik	result
30	2025	Målilla	Skrotfrag Arena	(Australia) Brady Kurtz	result

== Most wins ==
- (Australia) Jason Crump 4 times
- (Poland) Bartosz Zmarzlik 4 times

== See also ==
- List of sporting events in Sweden
- Speedway Grand Prix of Scandinavia
