= Speedway Grand Prix of Finland =

Finnish round of the motorcycle speedway world championship

(Finland) FIM FInnish Speedway Grand Prix
- Stadium: Ratina Stadium, Tampere
- Years: 2 (2014–2015)
- Track Length: 387,7 m

Last Event (season 2015)
- Date: 2015

Speedway Grand Prix of Finland was a round of the part of the Speedway Grand Prix series (the speedway world championship). The event only took place for two years from 2014 to 2015 before being dropped from the SGP calendar.

== Winners ==
	Season	City	Stadium	Winner
1	2014	Tampere	Ratina Stadium	(Slovenia) Matej Zagar	result
2	2015	Tampere	Ratina Stadium	(Denmark) Nicki Pedersen	result
