= Speedway Grand Prix of Nordic =

Speedway world championship event

(Denmark) FIM Dansk Metal Nordic Speedway Grand Prix
- Stadium: Speedway Center, Vojens
- Years: 5 (2009-2012, 2014)
- Track: speedway track
- Track Length: 300 m

Last Event (season 2014)
- Date: 13 September 2014

The Speedway Grand Prix of Nordic was a motorcycle speedway event that was a part of the Speedway Grand Prix series (the world championship).

It was the second Grand Prix event held in Denmark during the calendar year, alomng with the Speedway Grand Prix of Denmark. It was staged between 2009 and 2014 at the Speedway Center in Vojens.

It was last held in 2014, effectively being replaced by additional Grand Prix events in Poland from the 2015 season.

== Winners ==
	Season	City	Stadium	Winner
1	2009	Vojens	Speedway Center	(Sweden) Andreas Jonsson	result
2	2010	Vojens	Speedway Center	(Poland) Tomasz Gollob	result
3	2011	Vojens	Speedway Center	(United States) Greg Hancock	result
4	2012	Vojens	Speedway Center	(Denmark) Michael Jepsen Jensen	result
5	2014	Vojens	Speedway Center	(Sweden) Andreas Jonsson	result

== Most wins ==
(Sweden) Andreas Jonsson 2 times

== See also ==
- Speedway Grand Prix
