= Tampere Stadium =

Stadium in Tampere, Finland

- Ratina Stadium
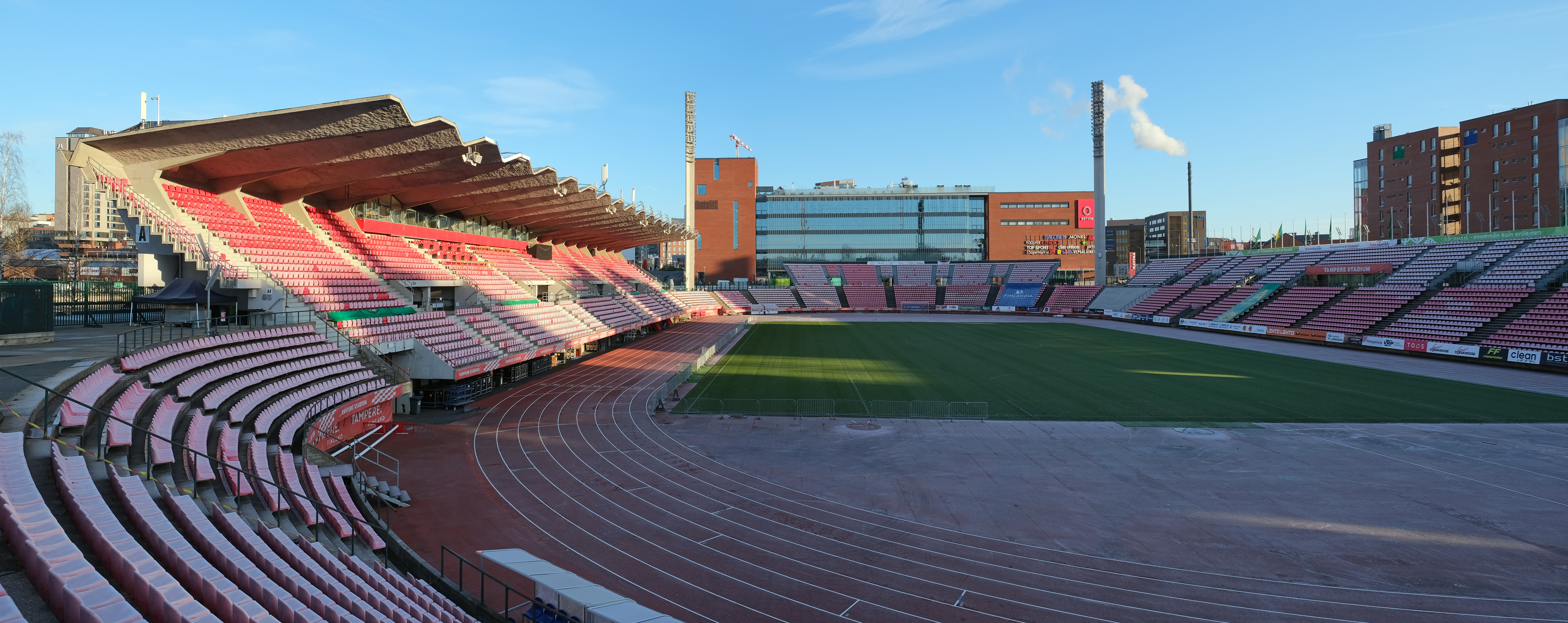
- Interactive map of Tampere Stadium
- Full name: Tampere Stadium
- Location: Ratina, Tampere, Finland
- Coordinates: 61°29′33″N 023°45′51″E
- Owner: City of Tampere
- Operator: City of Tampere
- Capacity: 16,800
- Surface: Grass
- Field size: 105 m × 66 m (344 ft × 217 ft)

Construction
- Groundbreaking: 1 October 1963; 63 years ago
- Built: 1963-1966
- Opened: 13 August 1966; 60 years ago
- Renovated: 2001-2004, 2014-2016
- Architect: Timo Penttilä

Tenants
- Finland national football team (2016–2019); Ilves (2020–2023, occasionally before); Tampere United (2004–2010)

Tampere Stadium (Finnish: Tampereen stadion), also known as Ratina Stadium (Finnish: Ratinan stadion) is a multi-purpose stadium in Tampere, Finland. It has a seating capacity of 16,800 people, and a capacity of up to 32,000 people for concerts. The pitch was originally completed for the 1952 Summer Olympics when it hosted five qualification and preliminary round matches in football. The stadium with its stands was opened in 1966 and it was designed by architect Timo Penttilä. In 2009, Tampere stadium was one of the stadiums for the UEFA Women's Euro 2009. In 2018 the stadium hosted the IAAF World U20 Championships and in 2025 it hosted the European Athletics U20 Championships. The stadium has also hosted several matches of the Finland national football team.

== History and architecture ==
Plans for a stadium at Ratina date back to the 1930s, though nothing more than an ice rink had been built on the site by 1936. The idea was revived when Finland was awarded the 1952 Summer Olympics, and a playing field was sown at Ratina in 1949, though the venue used for the Olympic football matches that year was largely temporary rather than the stadium known today. The stadium that eventually replaced it was designed by Timo Penttilä in 1963 and completed by 1966. Built almost entirely from reinforced concrete, including its floodlight masts and the roof of the main stand, it is regarded as a notable example of Finnish sporting modernist architecture of its era; although much of the original auditorium sits below ground level, the stadium's distinctive straight floodlight masts remain a recognisable feature of the Tampere skyline.

The stadium underwent a major renovation between 2001 and 2004, which converted it into an all-seater venue, and a further renovation between 2014 and 2016 fitted it with an under-soil heated pitch meeting international football standards. A new Mondo running track surface was laid in 2017, and a new electronic timing system was installed the following year. The 16,800-seat capacity is divided among four stands: the main stand (3,533 seats), the "sun stand" opposite it (4,443 seats), and the two end stands (4,192 and 4,227 seats respectively), along with 200 press seats and 34 VIP seats.

=== Future ===
The stadium is a protected building, and by the mid-2020s city officials had begun discussing how to renovate it in the long term. In July 2026, Tampere MP Aleksi Jäntti proposed in parliament that the stadium be redeveloped into a venue for 20,000 to 25,000 spectators, which would make it the largest of its kind in Finland; Tampere's mayor, Ilmari Nurminen, said any such expansion would require state funding. A city working group has estimated that a full renovation could become financially feasible in the late 2030s, around the time the stadium is expected to reach the end of its structural lifespan; because the building is heritage-protected, any renovation is considered technically challenging, and adding a roof alone has been estimated to cost hundreds of millions of euros, which officials say is not affordable in the near term.

== Football ==
The stadium has primarily hosted football matches throughout its history. It served as Tampere United's home stadium from 2004 to 2010 and it was the home stadium for the Finnish national team between 2016 and 2019 due to the renovation of the Helsinki Olympic Stadium. The stadium has also been used by Ilves, which holds the record attendances for football matches in both European and domestic competitions: 24,873 against Juventus on 19 September 1984 in the European Cup and 15,000 against Kokkolan Palloveikot on 9 October 1983 in the Finnish League.

== Music ==
Over the years the stadium has hosted several music events. In addition to standalone concerts, it serves as the main arena for the annual hip hop festival Blockfest.

=== Concerts ===
Date	Artist(s)	Tour/Event
14 August 2004	Eppu Normaali	–
18 August 2007	Toto	Falling in Between Tour
19 July 2008	Iron Maiden	Somewhere Back in Time World Tour
9 August 2008	PMMP; Ismo Alanko; Popeda; Eppu Normaali	Suomi-ilmiö 2008
2 June 2009	Bruce Springsteen	Working on a Dream Tour
26 May 2010	Bryan Adams	–
1 June 2010	AC/DC	Black Ice World Tour
1 August 2012	Red Hot Chili Peppers	I'm With You World Tour
26 May 2013	Bon Jovi	Because We Can World Tour
31 July 2015	Nightwish	Endless Forms Most Beautiful World Tour
6 August 2016	Eppu Normaali	40th Anniversary Concert
10 August 2017	Robbie Williams	The Heavy Entertainment Show Tour
4 August 2018	Popeda	Popeda.Ratina.Rakkaus
9 August 2019	Rammstein	Europe Stadium Tour 2019
10 August 2019	Rammstein	Europe Stadium Tour 2019
30 July 2022	Hassisen kone	40th Anniversary Reunion Tour
4 August 2022	Juha Tapio	Elossa!
2 September 2023	Popeda	Ratinasta poikki
7 July 2025	Guns N’ Roses	2025 World Tour
23 August 2025	Apulanta with Sinfonia Lahti	
6 August 2026	Eppu Normaali	Kaikki häipyy, on vain nyt farewell tour
7 August 2026	Eppu Normaali	Kaikki häipyy, on vain nyt farewell tour
8 August 2026	Eppu Normaali	Kaikki häipyy, on vain nyt farewell tour

== Speedway ==
Tampere Stadium is also used as a venue for motorcycle speedway. The stadium played host to the 1995 World Under-21 Championship Final won by Australia's Jason Crump, and in 2014 the stadium hosted the inaugural Speedway Grand Prix of Finland won by Slovenian rider Matej Zagar. Speedway returned to Ratina the following year, with the Finnish Grand Prix as Round 2 of the 2015 Speedway Grand Prix series. The speedway track is laid out over the stadium's 400 metres (440 yards) athletics track.

== See also ==
- Blockfest
- Ratina (shopping centre)
- Tampere Arena
