= Speedway Grand Prix of Denmark =

Round of the motorcycle speedway world championship

(Denmark) Danish Speedway Grand Prix
- Stadium: Speedway Center, Vojens
- Years: 28 (1995-2019, 2021-present)
- Track: permanent track
- Track Length: 272 m

Last Event (season 2025)
- Date: 13 September 2025
- Winner: (Australia) Brady Kurtz

The Speedway Grand Prix of Denmark is a motorcycle speedway event that is a part of the Speedway Grand Prix series (the world championship).

The event was first held at the Vojens Speedway Center from 1995 to 2002 before switching to the Parken Stadium in Copenhagen from 2003 to 2014, while Vojens hosted the Speedway Grand Prix of Nordic. After four years at the CASA Arena in Horsens between 2015 and 2018, the event returned to Vojens in 2019.

== Winners ==
	Season	City	Stadium	Winner
1	1995	Vojens	Speedway Center	(Denmark) Hans Nielsen	result
2	1996	Vojens	Speedway Center	(United States) Billy Hamill	result
3	1997	Vojens	Speedway Center	(England) Mark Loram	result
4	1998	Vojens	Speedway Center	(Denmark) Hans Nielsen	result
5	1999	Vojens	Speedway Center	(Sweden) Tony Rickardsson	result
6	2000	Vojens	Speedway Center	(United States) Greg Hancock	result
7	2001	Vojens	Speedway Center	(Sweden) Tony Rickardsson	result
8	2002	Vojens	Speedway Center	(Sweden) Tony Rickardsson	result
9	2003	Copenhagen	Parken Stadium	(Australia) Jason Crump	result
10	2004	Copenhagen	Parken Stadium	(Australia) Jason Crump	result
11	2005	Copenhagen	Parken Stadium	(Sweden) Tony Rickardsson	result
12	2006	Copenhagen	Parken Stadium	(Denmark) Hans Andersen	result
13	2007	Copenhagen	Parken Stadium	(Sweden) Andreas Jonsson	result
14	2008	Copenhagen	Parken Stadium	(Poland) Tomasz Gollob	result
15	2009	Copenhagen	Parken Stadium	(Australia) Jason Crump	result
16	2010	Copenhagen	Parken Stadium	(Poland) Jarosław Hampel	result
17	2011	Copenhagen	Parken Stadium	(Poland) Tomasz Gollob	result
18	2012	Copenhagen	Parken Stadium	(Australia) Jason Crump	result
19	2013	Copenhagen	Parken Stadium	(Australia) Darcy Ward	result
20	2014	Copenhagen	Parken Stadium	(Denmark) Niels-Kristian Iversen	result
21	2015	Horsens	CASA Arena	(Denmark) Peter Kildemand	result
22	2016	Horsens	CASA Arena	(Poland) Maciej Janowski	result
23	2017	Horsens	CASA Arena	(Poland) Maciej Janowski	result
24	2018	Horsens	CASA Arena	(England) Tai Woffinden	result
25	2019	Vojens	Speedway Center	(Poland) Bartosz Zmarzlik	result
26	2021	Vojens	Speedway Center	(Russia) Artem Laguta	result
27	2022	Vojens	Speedway Center	(Poland) Bartosz Zmarzlik	result
28	2023	Vojens	Speedway Center	(Denmark) Leon Madsen	result
29	2024	Vojens	Speedway Center	(England) Robert Lambert	result
30	2025	Vojens	Speedway Center	(Australia) Brady Kurtz	result

== Most wins ==
- (Sweden) Tony Rickardsson 4 times
- (Australia) Jason Crump 4 times

== See also ==
- List of Speedway Grand Prix riders
