= Vojens Speedway Center =

Motorcycle speedway track in Vojens, Denmark

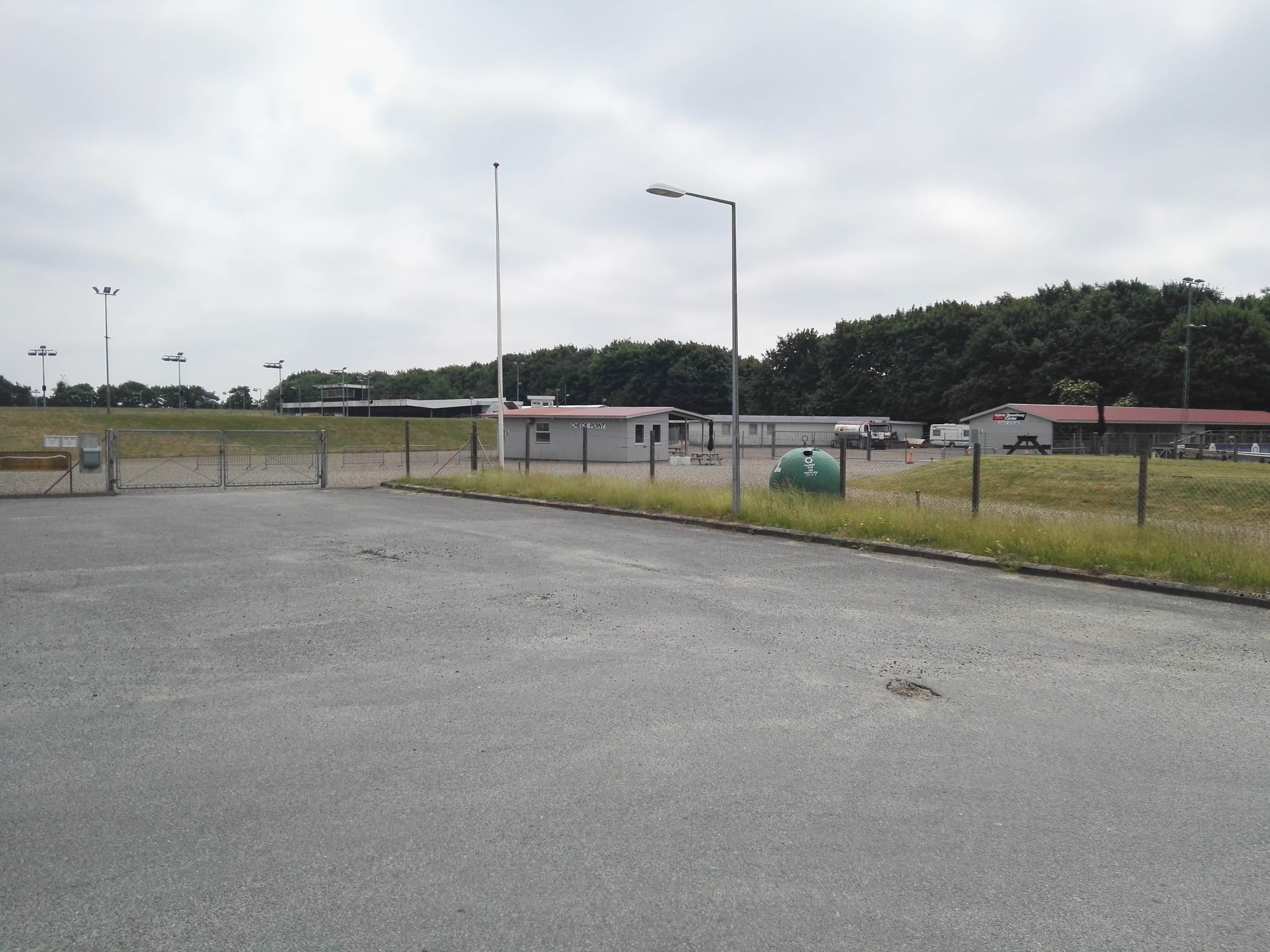
- The main track is on the left and the smaller track is on the right
- Location: Tinglykke 9, 6500 Vojens, Denmark
- Coordinates: 55°14′10″N 9°16′58″E
- Capacity: 15,000
- Operator: Vojens Speedway Klub (1976–2011); Denmark national team (1975–); Sønderjylland Elite Speedway (2020–)
- Opened: 21 September 1975
- Website: vojensspeedwaycenter.dk

The Vojens Speedway Center is a Motorcycle speedway track located in Vojens, Denmark. The track has been part-owned since its opening by Denmark's first three time Speedway World Champion Ole Olsen.

== Track ==
The Speedway Center is a 300 metres (330 yards) long track which opened in September 1975 and has a spectator capacity of approximately 15,000. Since its opening it has hosted numerous Danish national and international meetings including hosting the Danish Championship in 1977, 1979 and 1981.

== World Championship meetings ==
The Speedway Center hosted the Speedway World Final in 1988 and again in 1994, the final time the World Championship was held in the single meeting format before the advent of the Speedway Grand Prix series in 1995. It hosted the Final of the World Pairs Championship in 1979 and 1993, the World Team Cup in 1983, 1986 (round 2 of 3), 1991 and 1998, as well as the World Cup in 2003, 2008 and 2010. The Center also hosted the Speedway Grand Prix of Denmark from 1995 until 2002 and has hosted the Speedway Grand Prix of Nordic (with the exception of 2013) since 2009.

A Danish rider or the Danish team has won at least one of each of the types of World Finals held in Vojens as well as at least one Danish and Nordic Grand Prix.

The Speedway Center has also twice hosted the Under-21 World Championship Final, including the inaugural Final in 1977 when it was known as the European Under-21 Championship. On that occasion the meeting had to be called to a halt after only 12 heats had been run due to heavy rain. Denmark's Alf Busk, who to that point was undefeated on 9 points was declared the winner.

The rain was a future pointer to racing at Vojens with many meetings having to be postponed due to the weather. British television commentator Dave Lanning reported that there was a near riot when the 1979 World Pairs Final was postponed for a day due to rain, and two years later there were chaotic scenes at the 1981 Intercontinental Final when the riders refused to come out for their second round of heats in protest over the conditions. The 16 riders voted 14-2 not to ride with only Ole Olsen and fellow Dane Hans Nielsen wanting to continue. It was only after the riders were threatened with disqualification did they agree to finish the meeting. The Final was the last qualifying round for the 1981 World Championship Final to be held at the Wembley Stadium in England six weeks later.

== Speedway World Finals ==
Since its opening, the Vojens Speedway Center has hosted 13 FIM World Finals in each of the major competitions. It also hosted numerous World Championship qualifying rounds including the Nordic and Intercontinental Finals (Individual World Championship) and the Race-Off for the Speedway World Cup (the Race-Off is generally held at the same venue of the WC Final). Fittingly, the first World Championship Final held at the track, the 1979 World Pairs Final, was won by Danes Hans Nielsen and the track's owner Ole Olsen.

The 1994 Individual World Final, the last time the championship was run as a single meeting, saw a three-way runoff for the championship with Sweden's Tony Rickardsson defeating local favourite Hans Nielsen and the surprise of the meeting, Australia's Craig Boyce. This was the first of Rickardsson's record-equalling 6 World Championships, a record he jointly holds with New Zealand's Ivan Mauger.

The Vojens Speedway Center was announced as the host track for the Race-Off and Final of the 2015 Speedway World Cup. The Danish team, which received automatic qualification into the Final as the host nation, were unsuccessful in defending the title they had won the 2014 title in Poland with Sweden emerging victorious by 2 points over the Danes with Poland and Australia finishing in 3rd and 4th.

=== Individual World Championship ===
- 1988 - (Denmark) Erik Gundersen – 14+3pts
- 1994 - (Sweden) Tony Rickardsson – 12+3pts

=== World Pairs Championship ===
- 1979 - Denmark (Ole Olsen / Hans Nielsen) – 25pts
- 1993 - Sweden (Tony Rickardsson / Per Jonsson / Henrik Gustafsson) – 26pts

=== World Team Cup ===
- 1983 - Denmark (Erik Gundersen / Hans Nielsen / Ole Olsen / Peter Ravn / Finn Thomsen) – 32pts
- 1986* - Denmark (Hans Nielsen / Erik Gundersen / Tommy Knudsen / Jan O. Pedersen / John Jørgensen) – 130pts
- 1991 - Denmark (Jan O. Pedersen / Hans Nielsen / Tommy Knudsen / Gert Handberg / Brian Karger) – 51pts
- 1998 - United States (Billy Hamill / Greg Hancock / Sam Ermolenko) – 28pts

* Vojens hosted Round 2 of the 3 round 1986 World Team Cup Final

=== World Cup ===
- 2003 - Sweden (Andreas Jonsson / Mikael Max / Peter Ljung / Peter Karlsson / David Ruud) – 62pts
- 2008 - Denmark (Nicki Pedersen / Bjarne Pedersen / Kenneth Bjerre / Niels Kristian Iversen / Hans N. Andersen) – 49pts
- 2010 - Poland (Rune Holta / Jarosław Hampel / Tomasz Gollob / Adrian Miedziński / Janusz Kołodziej) – 44pts
- 2015 - Sweden (Antonio Lindbäck / Andreas Jonsson / Linus Sundström / Fredrik Lindgren) – 34pts

=== Speedway of Nations ===
- 2022 - Australia (Jack Holder / Max Fricke)

=== Individual Under-21 World Championship ===
- 1977 - (Denmark) Alf Busk – 9pts
- 1999 - (England) Lee Richardson – 13pts

== Speedway Grand Prix ==
Vojens has hosted 17 SGP events since 1995.

- 1995 Speedway Grand Prix of Denmark - - Hans Nielsen
- 1996 Speedway Grand Prix of Denmark - (United States) - Billy Hamill
- 1997 Speedway Grand Prix of Denmark - (England) - Mark Loram
- 1998 Speedway Grand Prix of Denmark - - Hans Nielsen
- 1999 Speedway Grand Prix of Denmark - (Sweden) - Tony Rickardsson
- 2000 Speedway Grand Prix of Denmark - (United States) - Greg Hancock
- 2001 Speedway Grand Prix of Denmark - (Sweden) - Tony Rickardsson
- 2002 Speedway Grand Prix of Denmark - (Sweden) - Tony Rickardsson
- 2009 Speedway Grand Prix of Nordic - (Sweden) - Andreas Jonsson
- 2010 Speedway Grand Prix of Nordic - (Poland) - Tomasz Gollob
- 2011 Speedway Grand Prix of Nordic - (United States) - Greg Hancock
- 2012 Speedway Grand Prix of Nordic - (Denmark) - Michael Jepsen Jensen
- 2014 Speedway Grand Prix of Nordic - (Sweden) - Andreas Jonsson
- 2019 Speedway Grand Prix of Denmark - (Poland) - Bartosz Zmarzlik
- 2021 Speedway Grand Prix of Denmark - (Russia) - Artem Laguta
- 2022 Speedway Grand Prix of Denmark - (Poland) - Bartosz Zmarzlik
- 2023 Speedway Grand Prix of Denmark - - Leon Madsen
- 2024 Speedway Grand Prix of Denmark - (England) - Robert Lambert
