= Józef Piłsudski Stadium (Bydgoszcz) =

Stadium in Poland

Stadion Miejski im. Józefa Piłsudskiego
- Stadion Polonii Bydgoszcz
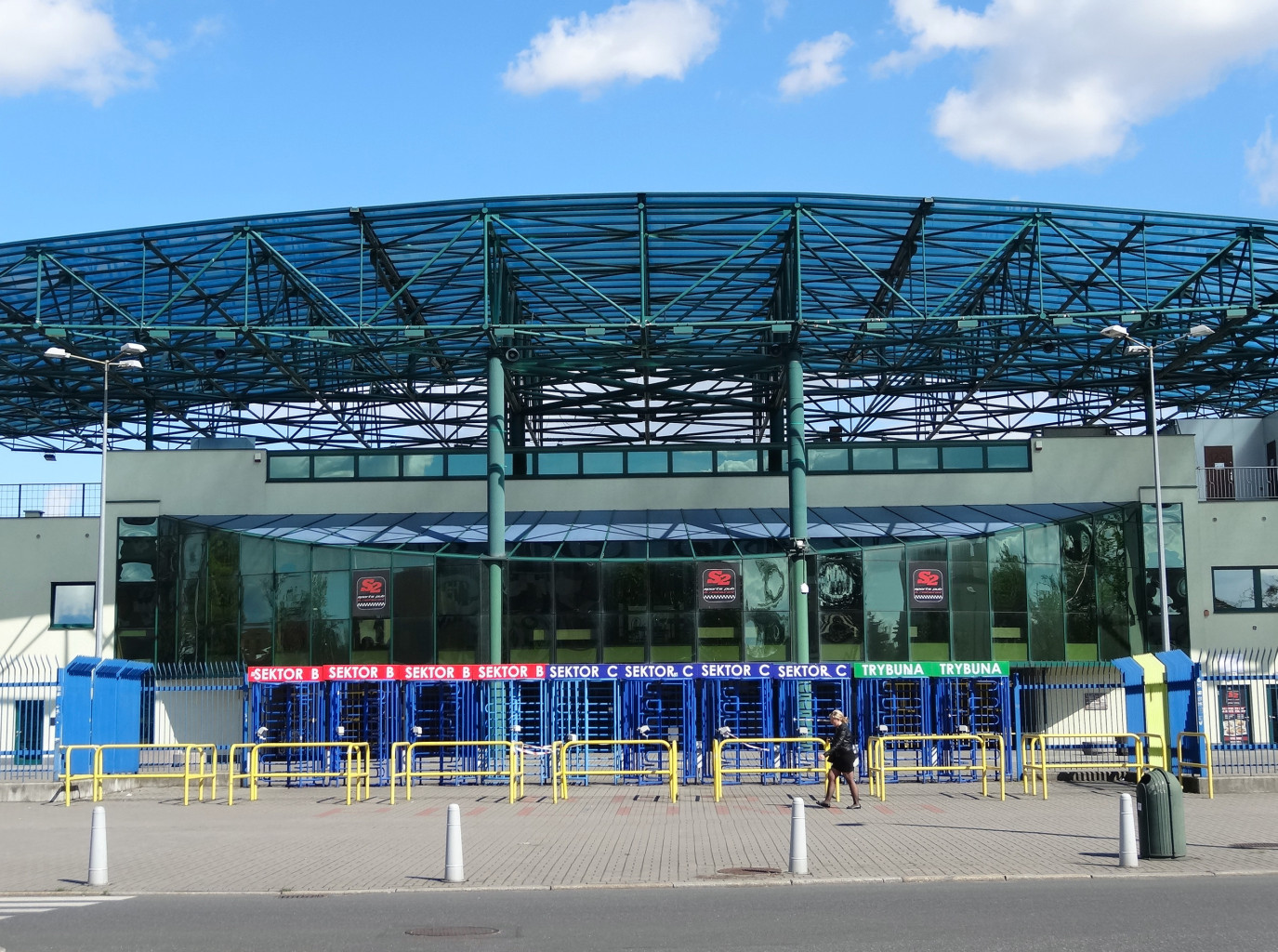
- Interactive map of Stadion Miejski im. Józefa Piłsudskiego
- Location: Bydgoszcz, Poland
- Coordinates: 53°7′39″N 18°1′27″E
- Owner: Bydgoszcz
- Operator: Polonia Bydgoszcz
- Capacity: 20,000
- Surface: Football (Grass); Speedway (Shale)

Construction
- Opened: 3 August 1924

Tenants
- Polonia Bydgoszcz; Speedway Grand Prix of Poland (1998, 1999, 2001-2010); Speedway Grand Prix of Europe (2000, 2013, 2014); Mieczysław Połukard Criterium of Polish Speedway Leagues Aces (curtain raise, Super cup)

Stadion Miejski im. Józefa Piłsudskiego (English: Józef Piłsudski Municipal Stadium), also known as Polonia Bydgoszcz Stadium (Polish: Stadion Polonii Bydgoszcz), is a multi-purpose stadium in Bydgoszcz, Poland. It is used mostly for motorcycle speedway and association football matches and is the home stadium of Polonia Bydgoszcz speedway and football teams. The stadium has a capacity of 20,000 people and was opened in 1924 by president Stanisław Wojciechowski.

== History ==
The stadium has hosted the final of both the Speedway World Team Cup in 1995 and the Speedway World Cup in 2014. It has also hosted 16 Speedway Grand Prix events including the final of the 2008 season which was actually run as the FIM Final Speedway Grand Prix. The final was to be the Speedway Grand Prix of Germany and held at the Veltins-Arena in Gelsenkirchen, however the FIM deemed that track to be unsafe due to the inclement weather (despite the Veltins-Arena sporting a retractable roof which was closed at the time the track was laid) and the GP was re-staged a week later in Bydgoszcz.

Poland's 2010 World Champion Tomasz Gollob is the most successful Grand Prix rider at the track, winning 7 of the 16 Grand Prix held in Bydgoszcz including the first GP held there, the 1998 Speedway Grand Prix of Poland.

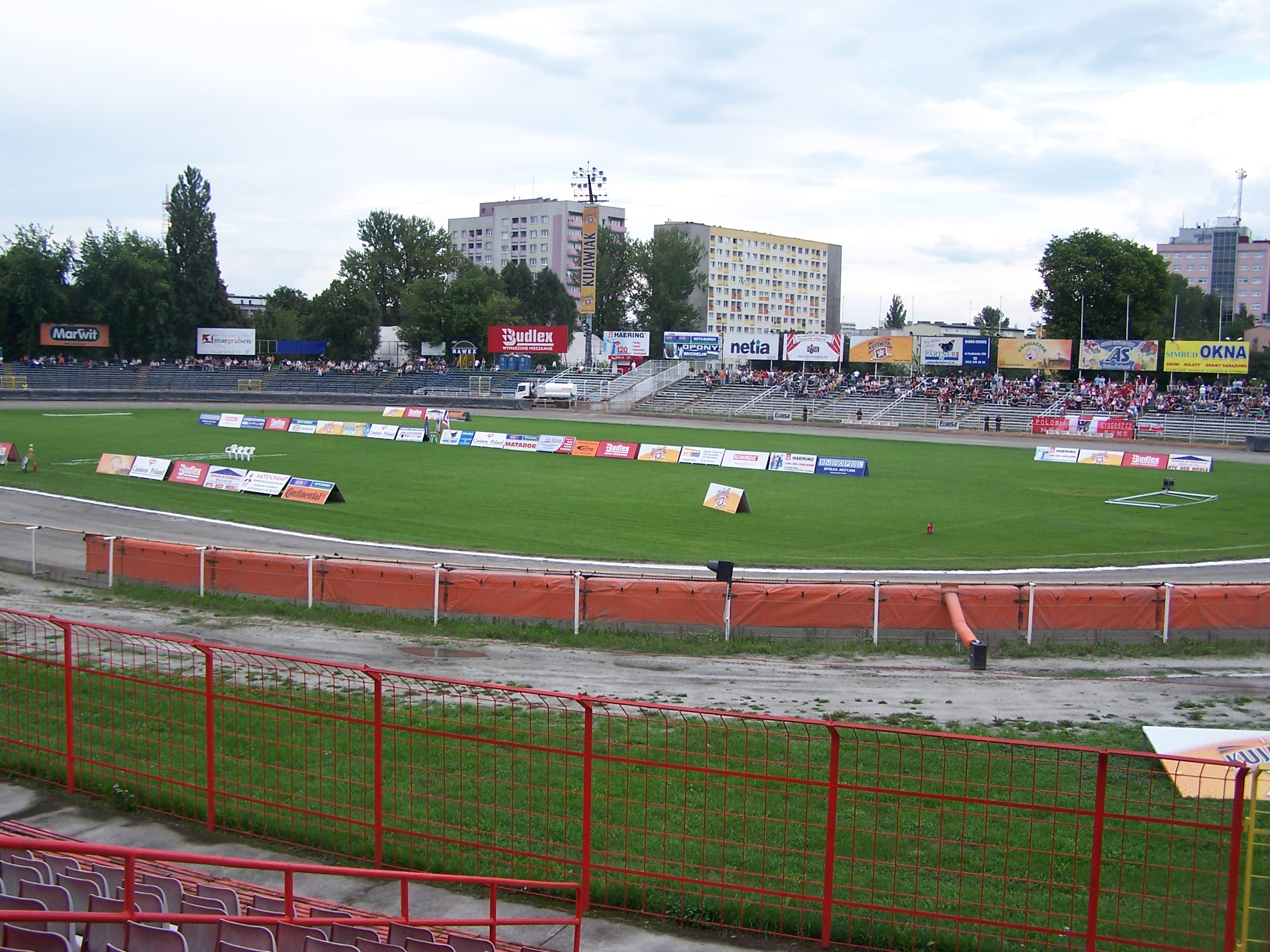
the speedway track in 2006

The speedway track at the stadium is 348 metres (381 yards) in length. Tomasz Gollob is the track record holder with 60.11 seconds for a 4 lap race with a clutch start. Gollob set his time on 20 June 1999.

== Speedway World Finals ==
=== World Team Cup ===
- 1995 - Denmark (Hans Nielsen / Tommy Knudsen / Brian Karger) - 28pts

=== World Cup ===
- 2014 - Denmark (Nicki Pedersen / Peter Kildemand / Mads Korneliussen / Niels-Kristian Iversen) - 38pts

== Speedway Grand Prix ==
- 1998 Speedway Grand Prix of Poland - Tomasz Gollob
- 1999 Speedway Grand Prix of Poland II - (Denmark) Hans Nielsen
- 2000 Speedway Grand Prix of Europe - (United States) Billy Hamill
- 2001 Speedway Grand Prix of Poland - (Australia) Jason Crump
- 2002 Speedway Grand Prix of Poland - Tomasz Gollob
- 2003 Speedway Grand Prix of Poland - Tomasz Gollob
- 2004 Speedway Grand Prix of Poland - Tomasz Gollob
- 2005 Speedway Grand Prix of Poland - Tomasz Gollob
- 2006 Speedway Grand Prix of Poland - (Denmark) Nicki Pedersen
- 2007 Speedway Grand Prix of Poland - Tomasz Gollob
- 2008 Speedway Grand Prix of Poland - (United States) Greg Hancock
- 2008 FIM Final Speedway Grand Prix* - (Poland) Tomasz Gollob
- 2009 Speedway Grand Prix of Poland - (Denmark) Nicki Pedersen
- 2010 Speedway Grand Prix of Poland - (Sweden) Andreas Jonsson
- 2013 Speedway Grand Prix of Europe - (Russia) Emil Sayfutdinov
- 2014 Speedway Grand Prix of Europe - (Poland) Krzysztof Kasprzak

* Event re-staged in Bydgoszcz due to FIM ruling the track at the Veltins-Arena in Gelsenkirchen, Germany was unsafe due to bad weather. As it was run in Poland it was renamed the "FIM Final Speedway Grand Prix".

== See also ==
- Stadion Miejski im. Zdzisława Krzyszkowiaka, Bydgoszcz
