= Darcy Ward =

Australian speedway rider

Darcy Stephen Ward
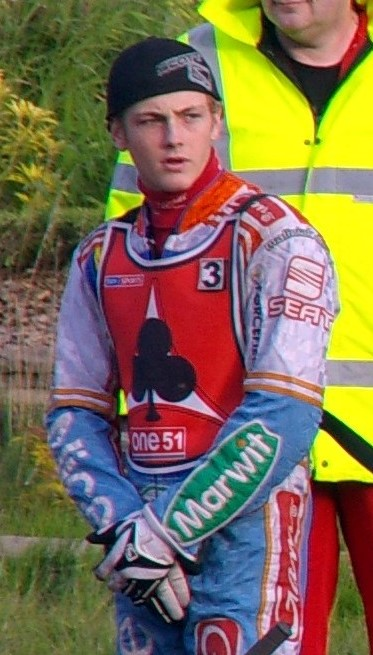
- Born: 4 May 1992 (age 34); Nanango, Queensland
- Nationality: Australian

Career history

Great Britain
- 2009: King's Lynn Stars
- 2010–2014: Poole Pirates
- 2015: Swindon Robins

Poland
- 2009–2010, 2012–2014: Toruń
- 2011: Gdańsk
- 2015: Zielona Góra

Germany
- 2009: Landshut

Sweden
- 2011: Lejonen
- 2012–2013: Dackarna
- 2014–2015: Piraterna

Individual honours
- 2009, 2010: Under-21 World Champion
- 2009, 2010, 2011: Australian Under-21 Champion
- 2009: Queensland Under-21 Champion
- 2010: NSW State Champion
- 2013: Golden Helmet of Pardubice

Team honours
- 2011, 2013, 2014: Elite League winner
- 2009: Premier League winner
- 2009,: Premier League KO Cup winner

Darcy Stephen Ward (born 4 May 1992 in Nanango, Queensland) is a former motorcycle speedway rider from Australia. He won the 2009, 2010 and 2011 Australian Under-21 Championships as well as the 2009 and 2010 World Under-21 Championships.

== Career history ==
=== Junior career ===
Ward started his speedway career as a junior in his native Queensland. He qualified for five Australian Under-16 Championships from 2003–2007, with a best finish of second in 2005 and again in 2007.

=== 2009 ===
In 2009, Ward rode for Unibax Toruń during the 2009 Polish speedway season and King's Lynn Stars in the 2009 Speedway Premier League. He also appeared for AC Landshut in Germany. Ward's first meeting in the Polish Ekstraliga was the Pomeranian-Kuyavian Derby between Toruń and Bydgoszcz at Polonia Stadium. In this match he scored seven points. Toruń won his meeting 51–39. Unibax Toruń won the regular season and after qualified for the Ekstraliga Final. In the final, Ward scored 11 points but his team lost to Falubaz Zielona Góta 80:88. In total, Ward scoring 63 points and 11 bonus points to record an average of 1.396.

Ward won the 2009 World Under-21 Championship in Goričan, Croatia with 13 points. He also rode for Australia team at the Under-21 World Cup. In a qualifying round he scored a maximum 15 points, but Australia finished third and were knocked out of the competition.

At home in Australia, Ward won the Australian Under-21 Championship in Gosford, the first of three straight Under-21 titles. He also finished ninth in his first run at the senior Australian Championship held over three rounds. Ward also won the Queensland Under-21 Championship in 2009.

With the King's Lynn Stars in Britain's Premier League, Ward won the League Championship, Knockout Cup and Premier Trophy.

=== 2010 ===
In 2010, Ward signed with Elite League team the Poole Pirates. Poole finished second in the 2010 Elite League.

At home, Ward won his second straight Australian Under-21 title at Mildura's Olympic Park Speedway. He finished the meeting in third place on 11 points, but went on to win the four-lap final. He then finished third in the three round Australian Championship behind Chris Holder and fellow Queenslander Troy Batchelor. Ward also won the New South Wales Championship at the Oakburn Park Speedway in Tamworth.

=== 2011–2012 ===
In January 2011, Ward became Australian Under-21 Champion for the third time at his home track, the North Brisbane Speedway, and thus emulating Chris Holder and Leigh Adams in claiming a straight hat-trick of titles. His 2011 win was a carbon copy of his 2010 win - third on 11 points before winning the Final. He then finished a career best second in the four round Australian Championship behind Holder and in front of Davey Watt.

In the 2011 season, starting in March, Ward rode for Poole, Lejonen and Wybrzeże Gdańsk.

On Saturday, 27 August, Ward made his FIM Speedway Grand Prix debut as a Wildcard in Toruń, where he claimed 3rd place. Largely due to his impressive performance at Toruń, Ward was subsequently nominated as the Wildcard for the season's final Grand Prix at Gorzów Wielkopolski on Saturday, 8 October. Ward was classified as sixth in the Grand Prix after the meeting was abandoned due to bad weather and deteriorating track conditions after sixteen of the scheduled twenty-three races had been completed. Ward's successful appearances led to him being offered a permanent place in the 2012 Grand Prix series,however, Ward subsequently rejected the offer in favour of riding for Toruń in the Polish Ekstraliga. He also won the silver medal at the 2011 Speedway Under-21 World Championship.

Ward missed a place in the 2012 Speedway Grand Prix series. He finished second with Poole in the Elite League. He also rode for Australia in the 2012 Speedway World Cup Final at the G&B Stadium in Målilla, Sweden, where he scored seven points to help the Aussies to a second-place finish behind Denmark.

=== 2013–2014 ===
Ward won his place in the 2013 Speedway Grand Prix as one of the 15 permanent riders. He won his first ever SGP when he took out the Grand Prix of Denmark at the Parken Stadium in Copenhagen, and two rounds later finished second in the Grand Prix of Latvia. Ward would eventually finish eighth with 106 points from the 12 round series, though he did miss three Grand Prix early in the season after breaking his shoulder in a crash at the Grand Prix of Sweden in Gothenburg.

As part of the Australian team, Ward finished third in the 2013 Speedway World Cup Final. He also rode for the Poole Pirates, winning the Elite League title.

Ward won the 2013 Golden Helmet of Pardubice, joining other Australian's Leigh Adams, Jason Crump and Ryan Sullivan as a winner of the Golden Helmet, the oldest speedway race in the world having been first run in 1929.

On 17 August 2014, Ward was excluded from the Latvian FIM Speedway Grand Prix in Daugavpils after failing an alcohol test prior to the meeting. The FIM would ultimately suspend Ward from all international competitions for 10 months, which saw him lose his place in the Grand Prix series for the 2015 championship.

Although Ward wanted to return to Apator Toruń after his suspension, he did not want to displace any current contracted riders.

=== 2015 ===
After returning from his FIM suspension, Ward signed up with the Swindon Robins in the British Elite League, Zielona Góra in the Polish Ekstraliga replacing the injured Jarosław Hampel, and Piraterna in the Swedish Elitserien. Despite his lengthy period on the sidelines, Ward would score well for all his clubs, particularly for Swindon where his performances lifted what had been a struggling team prior to his arrival into the league Play-offs.

Ward was riding for his Polish league team Zielona Góra on Sunday 23 August when he suffered a heavy crash in Heat 15 after catching Grudziadz rider Artem Laguta's back wheel. Ward was thrown awkwardly from his bike, landing on the back of his neck as he hit the safety fence. Reports confirmed that the crash left him with no lower body feeling. He was transported to hospital where he underwent spinal surgery. His career came to an end as a result of the injury.

Poole Pirates owner Matt Ford later reported that Ward had been moved to an undisclosed hospital in the UK where he has regained some movement of his arms. Ward left the UK to continue his rehab at the Making Strides rehab centre in Burleigh Heads on the Gold Coast. In Australia, Gillman Speedway promoter Dave Parker also announced a tribute meeting for Ward to be held at the Adelaide speedway on 7 November with the gate proceeds going to Ward to help with his medical costs.

== Promotion ==
In February 2021, Ward became a promoter and founded Darcy Ward Speedway Promotions in Australia. He works with other riders to expand his events internationally and also raises money for sick children.

Ward leases the North Brisbane Speedway track from the North Brisbane Junior Motorcycle Club (NBJMC). The track located on the west side of the Kedron Brook, at (27°23′30″S 153°05′25″E) has hosted important events, including the final of the 2024 Australian Speedway Championship.

== Personal life ==
Ward's father, George, was also a speedway rider.

In May 2012, Ward was cleared of sexual assault in the United Kingdom after an incident on 17 August 2011.

On 20 October 2012, Ward was injured in an altercation outside the Churchill Arms, Sturminster Marshall, whilst out with a group of friends including his Poole Pirates team manager Neil Middleditch. Ward suffered a head injury after hitting his head on the floor following a punch during the fight. The injury caused Ward to miss the second leg of the British Elite League Play-off Final. No charges were pressed.

On 13 February 2013, Ward appeared before Ipswich Magistrates Court, Queensland, to plead guilty to driving under the influence of liquor or a drug, failing to stop for the police, driving without a licence and driving an unregistered and uninsured vehicle. Ward pleaded guilty and was fined £3275.68 and was disqualified from driving for two years. Ward subsequently issued a public apology.

== Major results ==
=== World Final Appearances ===
Individual World Championship

- 2011 - 16th - 22pts
- 2013 - 8th - 106pts
- 2014 - 14th - 75pts

World Cup

- 2011 - (Poland) Gorzów Wielkopolski, Edward Jancarz Stadium - 2nd - 45pts (4)
- 2012 - (Sweden) Målilla, G&B Stadium - 2nd - 39pts (7)
- 2013 - (Czech Republic) Prague, Marketa Stadium - 3rd - 33pts (9)
- 2014 - (Poland) Bydgoszcz, Polonia Bydgoszcz Stadium - 3rd - 36pts (10)

Individual U-21 World Championship

- 2009 - (Croatia) Goričan, Stadium Milenium - Winner - 13pts
- 2010 - (Poland) / (Latvia) / (Czech Republic) - Winner - 35+3pts
- 2011 - (United Kingdom) / (Denmark) / (Czech Republic) / (Poland) - 2nd - 46+3pts

Under-21 World Cup

- 2012 - (Poland) Gniezno, Stadion Startu Gniezno - 2nd - 44pts (14)
- 2013 Team Speedway Junior World Championship - (Czech Republic) Pardubice, Svítkova Stadion - 4th - 20pts (11)

=== Speedway Grand Prix results ===
Year	Position	Points	Best finish	Notes
2011	16th	22	3rd	Third in Polish Grand Prix
2013	8th	106	Winner	Won Danish Grand Prix
2014	14th	75	2nd	Second in European Grand Prix

=== Domestic competitions ===
Australian Championship

- 2009 (3 rounds) - 9th - 34pts
- 2010 (3 rounds) - 3rd - 51pts
- 2011 (4 rounds) - 2nd - 63pts + 3pts - 1st at Olympic Park Speedway (Rd.4)

Australian Under-21 Championship

- 2009 - Gosford Speedway - Winner - 14pts
- 2010 - Olympic Park Speedway - Winner - 11pts (3rd) - 1st in Final
- 2011 - North Brisbane Speedway - Winner - 11pts (3rd) - 1st in Final

Australian Under-16 Championship

- 2003 - Bibra Lake Speedway - 13th - 5pts
- 2004 - Olympic Park Speedway - 14th - 2pts
- 2005 - Allen Park Speedway - 2nd - 12pts (4th) - 2nd in Final
- 2006 - Sidewinders Speedway - 5th - 9pts
- 2007 - Gold Coast Speedway - 2nd - 12pts (3rd) - 2nd in Final

Queensland Under-21 Championship

- 2009 - North Brisbane Speedway - Winner

New South Wales Championship

- 2010 - Oakburn Park Speedway - Winner

== See also ==
- Australia national speedway team
- Australian Under-21 Team
