= Skrotfrag Arena =

Stadium in Målilla, Sweden

- Location: Skrotfrag Arena 1, 570 82 Målilla, Sweden
- Coordinates: 57°22′31″N 15°46′50″E
- Capacity: 15,000
- Opened: 1993
- Length: 0.305 km

The Skrotfrag Arena is a 15,000-capacity multi-use stadium in Målilla, Sweden. The stadium is regularly used as the venue for the World Championship races; the Speedway Grand Prix of Scandinavia and the Speedway Grand Prix of Sweden (rounds of the Speedway Grand Prix, which is the premier world event in motorcycle speedway.

The Arena is also the home venue of the speedway team called Dackarna who race in the Elitserien. The speedway track has a circumference of 305 metres.

The stadium opened on 29 June 1993 when it was known as the new Målilla Motorstadion and the track record for 500cc is 55.1sec by Andreas Jonsson recorded on 23 August 2011. From 2006 until 2019 it was known as the G & B Arena for sponsorship purposes.

In 2022, Bartosz Zmarzlik sealed his third world title at the stadium.

== See also ==
- Speedway Grand Prix of Sweden
- Speedway Grand Prix of Scandinavia
