= Målilla =

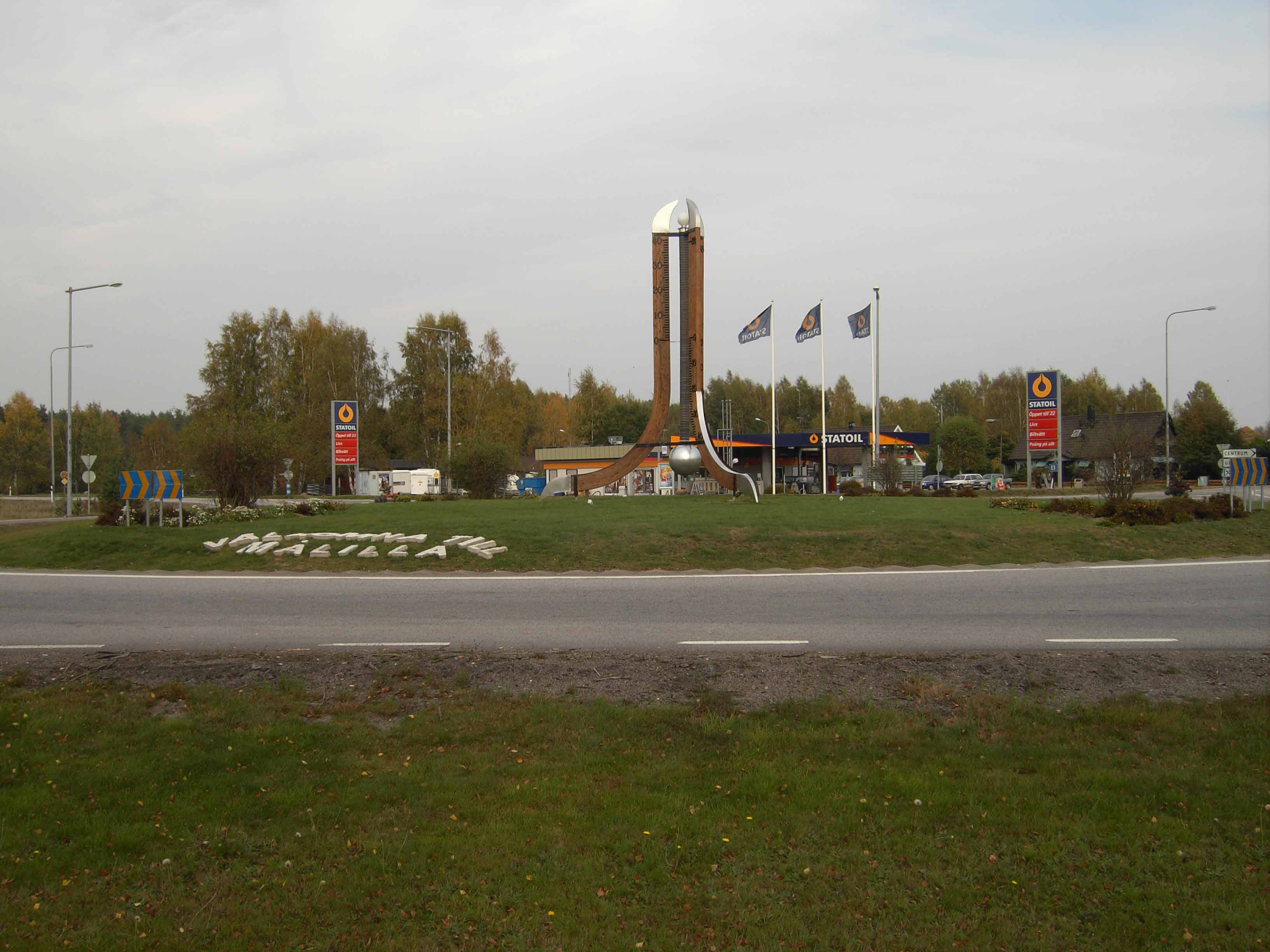
- Målilla roundabout, here in October 2005, has a large thermometer in its centre

- Location within Kalmar Location within Sweden
- Coordinates: 57°23′N 15°48′E
- Country: Sweden
- Province: Småland
- County: Kalmar County
- Municipality: Hultsfred Municipality

Area
  - Total: 3.26 km^{2} (1.26 sq mi)

Population (31 December 2010)
  - Total: 1,524
  - Density: 468/km^{2} (1,210/sq mi)
- Time zone: UTC+1 (CET)
  - Summer (DST): UTC+2 (CEST)

Målilla (Swedish pronunciation: [ˈmôːˌlɪlːa]) is a locality in Hultsfred Municipality, Kalmar County, Sweden with 1,524 inhabitants in 2010.

It is commonly known as the temperature capital of Sweden due to both high and low temperature records being set there. A Swedish record high temperature of +38 °C (100.4 °F) was set on June 29, 1947. This record is shared with Ultuna in Uppland. The lowest temperature recorded is −33.8 °C, one of the lowest ever recorded in southern Sweden.

Due to its fame for the extremes in temperature, the center of the town's main roundabout features a 15 metre high thermometer. Shortly after its construction in December 2000, it was hit by a motorist and its bulb had to be replaced.

== Sport and leisure ==
=== Speedway ===
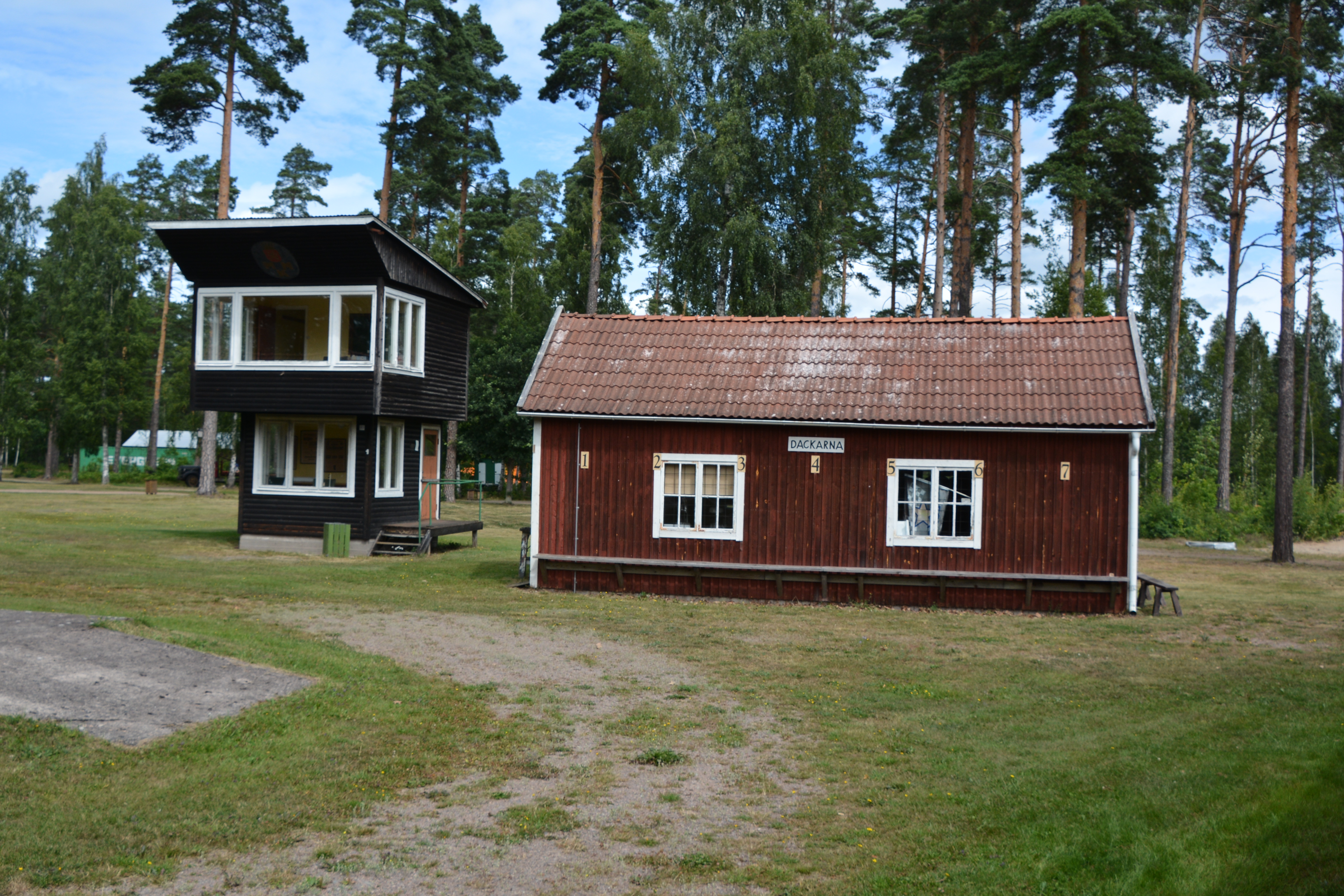
The locker room building and announcer's tower from the Gamla Målilla Motorstadion, moved to the Målilla-Gårdveda Local History Park and converted into a museum

Målilla is famous for motorcycle speedway and a team called Dackarna, who are six-time champions of Sweden.

The original name of the team changed several times due to sponsorship deals. Luxo Stars and Team Svelux were two passing names until the original name was reinstated. The team won the 2021 Swedish Speedway league and has raced at the Skrotfrag Arena since 1993.

The team also raced at the Gamla Målilla Motorstadion, which existed from 1935 to 1992 before being demolished.

== Climate ==
Målilla has a humid continental climate for the reference period of 1961–1990 with a January and February mean of −3 °C (27 °F). The data from recent years shows the climate moving towards an oceanic climate, though still continental overall with significant differences between seasons. Whilst winter temperatures have been too cold to be oceanic, summers have become warmer on average. The 2002–2014 July average high was 23.4 °C (74.1 °F). The highest temperature recorded since the all-time record-high temperature has been 37.2 °C (99.0 °F) measured in July 2022 according to SMHI's data series.

Despite being prone to temperature extremes, Målilla has a relatively normal climate, with slightly warmer days and colder nights than typical for the area, especially during spring, with April high temperatures averaging 13 °C (55 °F) for 2002–2014, but with night time lows being around freezing point. Other official statistical records include exceeding 20 °C (68 °F) in March, attaining 28.8 °C (83.8 °F) in April, and reaching 23 °C (73 °F) in October, all exceptionally warm by Swedish standards. In spite of this, the tied Swedish record of 38 °C (100 °F) set in June 1947 is the only national monthly record currently held by Målilla.

Climate data for Målilla 2002–2018 (Extremes since 1946)
| Month | Jan | Feb | Mar | Apr | May | Jun | Jul | Aug | Sep | Oct | Nov | Dec | Year |
|---|---|---|---|---|---|---|---|---|---|---|---|---|---|
| Record high °C (°F) | 11.2 (52.2) | 16.2 (61.2) | 20.9 (69.6) | 28.8 (83.8) | 30.2 (86.4) | 38.0 (100.4) | 37.2 (99.0) | 36.2 (97.2) | 29.2 (84.6) | 24.0 (75.2) | 16.9 (62.4) | 13.2 (55.8) | 38.0 (100.4) |
| Mean maximum °C (°F) | 7.4 (45.3) | 8.4 (47.1) | 15.3 (59.5) | 20.7 (69.3) | 25.6 (78.1) | 28.5 (83.3) | 29.9 (85.8) | 28.6 (83.5) | 23.9 (75.0) | 17.4 (63.3) | 12.0 (53.6) | 8.5 (47.3) | 31.0 (87.8) |
| Mean daily maximum °C (°F) | 0.9 (33.6) | 1.9 (35.4) | 6.4 (43.5) | 12.8 (55.0) | 18.0 (64.4) | 21.4 (70.5) | 23.6 (74.5) | 22.2 (72.0) | 17.9 (64.2) | 11.0 (51.8) | 5.9 (42.6) | 2.6 (36.7) | 12.0 (53.7) |
| Mean daily minimum °C (°F) | −5.0 (23.0) | −4.9 (23.2) | −3.6 (25.5) | 0.1 (32.2) | 4.3 (39.7) | 8.1 (46.6) | 11.2 (52.2) | 10.2 (50.4) | 7.0 (44.6) | 2.9 (37.2) | 0.3 (32.5) | −2.9 (26.8) | 2.3 (36.2) |
| Mean minimum °C (°F) | −18.1 (−0.6) | −16.6 (2.1) | −13.5 (7.7) | −7.3 (18.9) | −2.8 (27.0) | 1.3 (34.3) | 5.4 (41.7) | 2.9 (37.2) | −0.6 (30.9) | −5.8 (21.6) | −9.0 (15.8) | −13.6 (7.5) | −21.4 (−6.5) |
| Record low °C (°F) | −27.2 (−17.0) | −33.8 (−28.8) | −28.5 (−19.3) | −15.8 (3.6) | −7.2 (19.0) | −3.2 (26.2) | 0.9 (33.6) | −1.5 (29.3) | −8.0 (17.6) | −12.8 (9.0) | −22.8 (−9.0) | −27.0 (−16.6) | −33.8 (−28.8) |
| Average precipitation mm (inches) | 35.4 (1.39) | 29.2 (1.15) | 25.2 (0.99) | 24.6 (0.97) | 43.1 (1.70) | 67.4 (2.65) | 93.2 (3.67) | 72.4 (2.85) | 35.6 (1.40) | 53.5 (2.11) | 47.9 (1.89) | 36.8 (1.45) | 564.3 (22.22) |
Source 1: SMHI Open Data
Source 2: SMHI Monthly Data 2002–2018

== Notable people ==
- Janne Corax, adventurer and mountaineer, who is the only Swedish alpinist with first ascents in the Himalayas on the CV.
- Andreas Harrysson, darts player who plays in the World Darts Federation (WDF) and Professional Darts Corporation (PDC) events.
