= Troy Batchelor =

Australian speedway rider (born 1987)

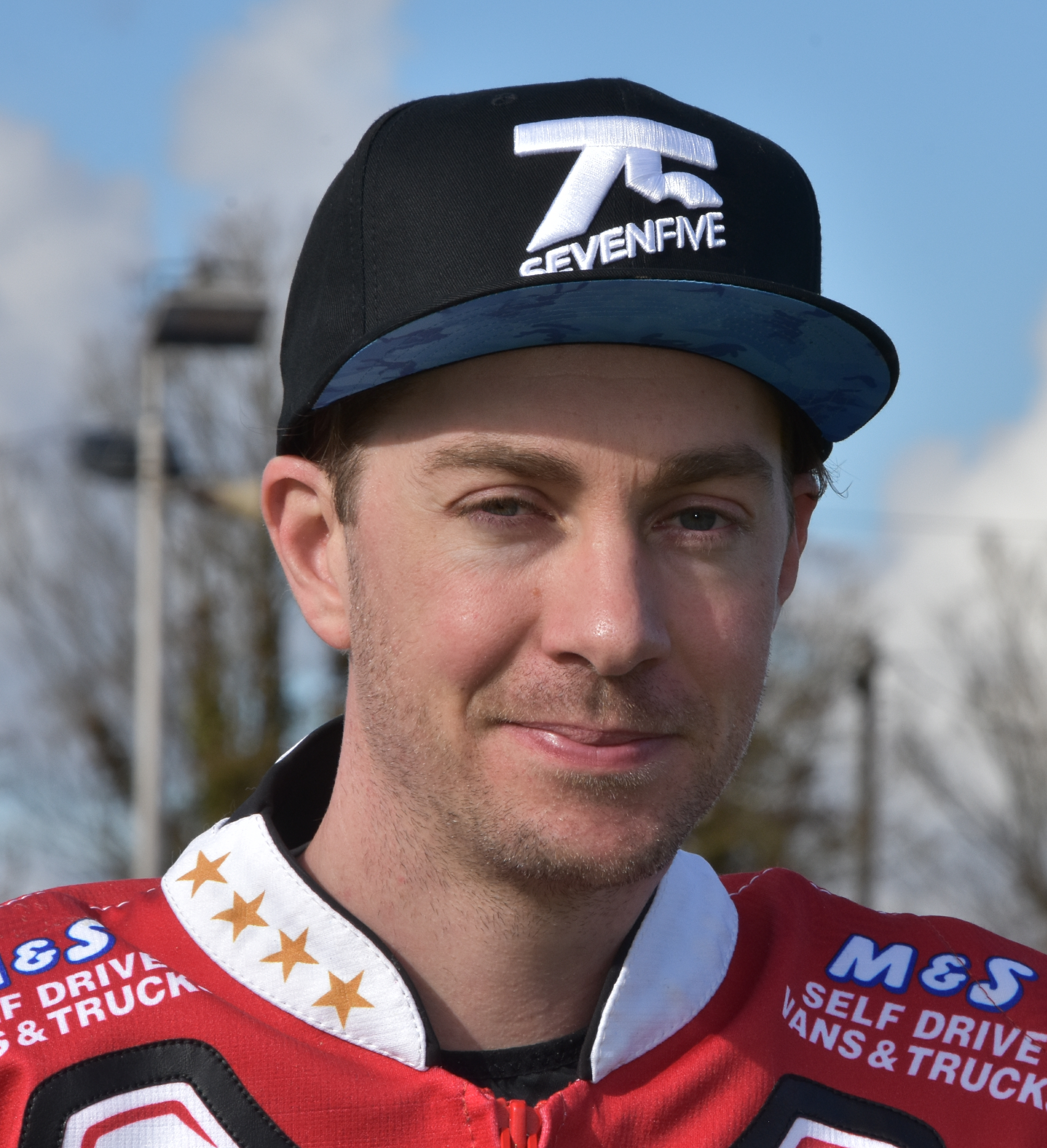
- Troy Batchelor in 2018
- Born: 29 August 1987 (age 39); Brisbane, Queensland, Australia
- Nationality: Australian

Career history

Great Britain
- 2005–2006, 2016–2017: King's Lynn Stars
- 2005: Eastbourne Eagles
- 2006: Coventry Bees
- 2007: Poole Pirates
- 2008–2009, 2012–2015, 2018–2020: Swindon Robins
- 2009, 2022: Ipswich Witches
- 2010–2011: Peterborough Panthers
- 2021: Sheffield Tigers
- 2021: Kent Royals
- 2022: Oxford Cheetahs
- 2023: Birmingham Brummies
- 2024–2025: Workington Comets

Poland
- 2007–2012: Leszno
- 2013–2014: Wrocław
- 2015–2016, 2018–2020: Rybnik
- 2017: Gdańsk
- 2020: Bydgoszcz
- 2022: Tarnów

Sweden
- 2010–2011: Lejonen
- 2012: Hammarby
- 2013–2014: Västervik
- 2019: Vetlanda

Denmark
- 2010–2011: Holsted
- 2014–2015: Fjelsted
- 2016–2018: Region Varde

Individual honours
- 2013: Australian Champion
- 2003, 2004: Australian Long Track Champion
- 2007: Queensland State Champion
- 2008, 2009, 2010, 2011, 2013, 2017: South Australian Champion
- 2017: Victorian State Champion
- 2014: Elite League Riders' Champion

Team honours
- 2012, 2019: tier 1 League Champion
- 2006: tier 1 KO Cup Winner
- 2008: Elite Shield
- 2022: tier 1 Pairs winner
- 2006: tier 2 League Champion
- 2005, 2006: tier 2 KO Cup winner
- 2005: Young Shield
- 2006: Premier Trophy Winner
- 2007: Ekstraliga Champion

Troy Matthew Batchelor (born 29 August 1987) is an Australian speedway rider.

== Career ==
=== Australia ===
Born in Brisbane, Queensland, Batchelor enjoyed his first success when he won the 2001 Queensland and New South Wales Under-16 championships and followed this up by winning the 2003 Australian Under-16 Championship at the Bibra Lake Speedway in Perth. After graduating to the senior ranks following his 16th birthday, Batchelor won the Queensland State Championship in 2007 before he moved to Adelaide in South Australia where he has won the South Australian Championship at the Gillman Speedway six times (2008-2011, 2013, 2017). As of 2023, he sat third in the all-time SA title winners list behind joint record holders John Boulger and Jack Young. Boulger and Young each won nine SA titles during their respective careers.

In January 2008, Batchelor finished runner-up to Chris Holder in the Australian Solo Championship. In January 2013, he won the Australian Championship after having finished second in both 2008 and 2010.

Batchelor also won the Australian Long Track Championship in 2003 at the Bathurst Showground, and again in 2004 at the Wagga Wagga Showground. On 3 December 2016, Batchelor added the Victorian Championship to his resume when he won the championship at Undera Park, defeating the U/21 World champion Max Fricke in the final.

=== UK and Europe ===
Batchelor began his British speedway career in 2005 when he signed for King's Lynn Stars in the Premier League. In his first year, he won the Premier League Knockout Cup and the Premier Trophy, with King's Lynn defeating Rye House Rockets in both finals. The next season Batchelor was back at King's Lynn and was also Elite League team Coventry Bees number 8 rider. That year King's Lynn won a treble of the Premier League Championship, Premier Trophy and the Premier League Knockout Cup. He also helped Coventry win the Elite League Knockout Cup.

In 2007, Batchelor stepped up to the Elite League full-time with the Poole Pirates, whom he signed for on loan from King's Lynn. He also signed for Polish team Unia Leszno in the Ekstraliga and helped them win the 2007 Ekstraliga Championship. In 2008, Batchelor was on loan at Swindon Robins and continued with Unia Leszno in Poland. He also signed for Dackarna in the Swedish Elitserien.

Following two years with Peterborough Panthers in 2010 and 2011, Batchelor joined Swindon for the 2012 season and won the 2012 Elite League with the club.

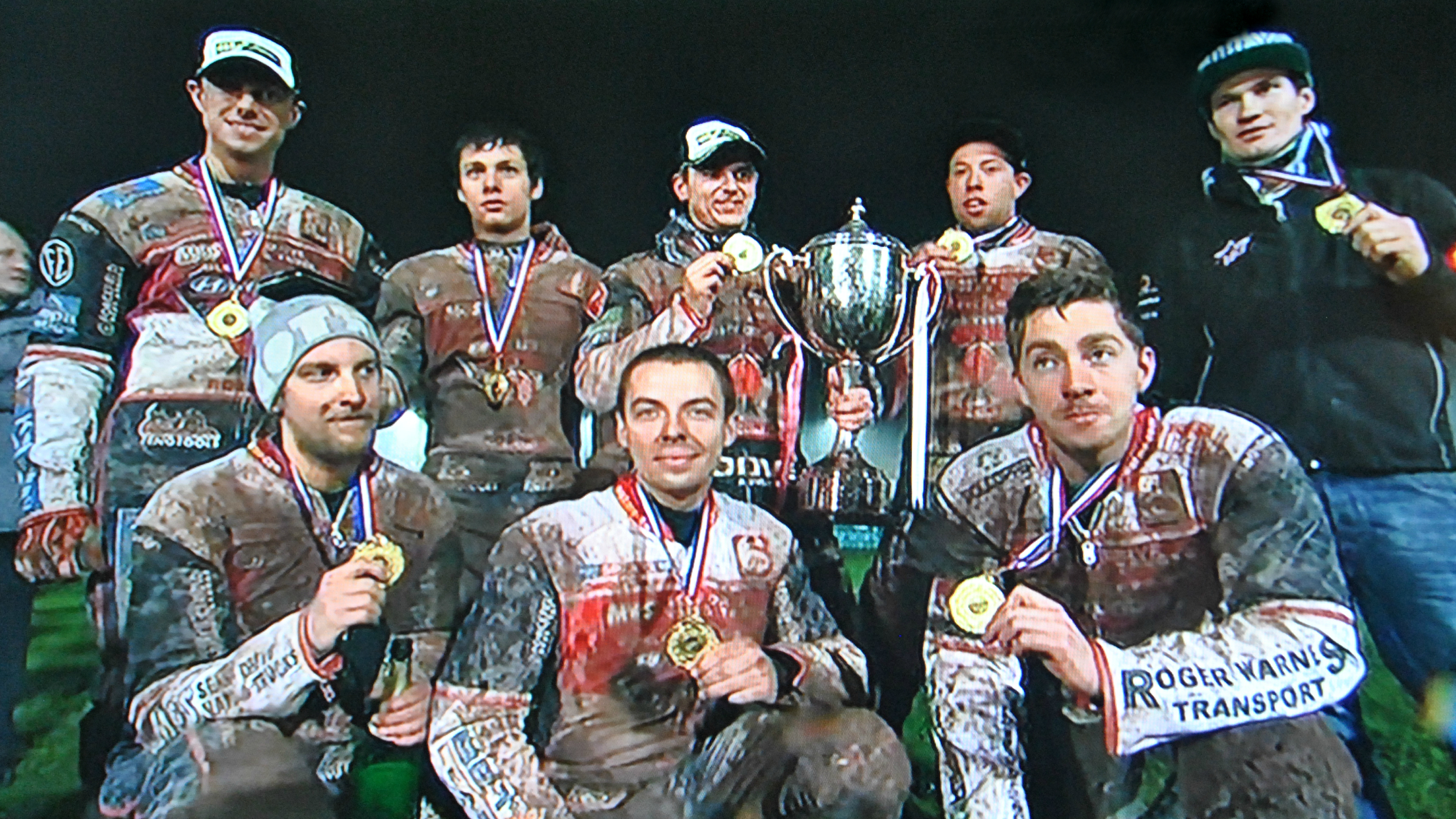
Batchelor (front right) celebrating the league win with Swindon in 2012

He won the Elite League Riders' Championship, held at King's Lynn Stadium on 25 September 2014.

In 2022, Batchelor joined Ipswich Witches from Sheffield Tigers for SGB Premiership 2022 season and won the Premiership Pairs. He also joined the Oxford Cheetahs for the SGB Championship 2022 season, with the Cheetahs were returning to action after a 14-year absence from British Speedway. After riding for Birmingham in 2023, he joined the Workington Comets for the 2024 season.

=== International ===
Batchelor made his Speedway Grand Prix debut in the Grand Prix of Poland II at the MotoArena Toruń in Poland in 2013. Riding as a substitute in the meeting, he finished in 12th place, scoring six points.

For the 2014 Speedway Grand Prix, Batchelor became one of the top 15 Qualified Riders of the series. In his first full-time run at the World Championship, he finished in ninth place with 91 points scored. Batchelor scored his first podium when he finished second in the Danish Grand Prix at the Parken Stadium in Copenhagen.

Batchelor has also represented Australia in the Speedway World Cup and numerous test matches.

== World Final appearances ==
=== World Cup ===
- 2009 - (Poland) Leszno, Alfred Smoczyk Stadium - 2nd - 43pts (4)
- 2011 - (Poland) Gorzów Wielkopolski, Edward Jancarz Stadium - 2nd - 45pts (10)
- 2013 - (Czech Republic) Prague, Marketa Stadium - 3rd - 33pts (11)
- 2014 - (Poland) Bydgoszcz, Polonia Bydgoszcz Stadium - 3rd - 36pts (2)
- 2015 - (Denmark) Vojens, Speedway Center - 4th - 26pts (8)

=== Individual Under-21 World Championship ===
- 2006 - (Italy) Terenzano, Pista Olimpia Terenzano - 17th - 2pts (Reserve)
- 2008 - (Czech Republic) Pardubice, Svítkov Stadion - 4th - 11pts

=== Under-21 World Cup ===
- 2008 - (Denmark) Holsted, Holsted Speedway Center - 4th - 33pts (7)

=== World Longtrack Championship ===
- 2004 (1 app) - 22nd - 5pts

== Speedway Grand Prix results ==
Year	Position	Points	Best finish	Notes
2013	25th	6	12th	Rode in season ending Poland II GP
2014	9th	91	Second	Second in Danish GP
2015	12th	59	Third	Third in Latvian Grand Prix
