= 2011 Speedway Grand Prix of Denmark =

- FIM Dansk Metal Danish Speedway Grand Prix

Information
- Date: 11 June 2011
- City: (Denmark) Copenhagen
- Event: 4 of 11 (137)
- Referee: (Sweden) Krister Gardell
- Jury President: (United Kingdom) Anthony Steele

Stadium details
- Stadium: Parken Stadium
- Length: 275 m (301 yd)

SGP Results
- Attendance: 18,000
- Best Time: (Russia) Artem Laguta; 56,09 secs (in Heat 2)
- (gold) Winner: (Poland) Tomasz Gollob
- (silver) Runner-up: (Australia) Jason Crump
- (bronze) 3rd place: (Australia) Chris Holder

The 2011 FIM Dansk Metal Danish Speedway Grand Prix was the fourth race of the 2011 Speedway Grand Prix season. It took place on 11 June at the Parken Stadium in Copenhagen, Denmark.

== Riders ==
The Speedway Grand Prix Commission nominated Mikkel B. Jensen as Wild Card, and Michael Jepsen Jensen and Kenneth Arendt Larsen as Track Reserves. The Draw was made on 10 June by Per Stig Møller, Culture Minister of Denmark and Minister for Ecclesiastical Affairs of Denmark in the Cabinet of Lars Løkke Rasmussen I.

Wild card Jensen became the youngest rider ever ride in the SGP event. The former youngest was Pole Maciej Janowski.

== Results ==
The Grand Prix was won by World Champion Tomasz Gollob, who beat Jason Crump, Chris Holder and Greg Hancock. Gollob became the World Championship leader.

=== Heat details ===
Placing	Draw	Rider	Total	1	2	3	4	5	6	7	8	9	10	11	12	13	14	15	16	17	18	19	20	Pts	Pos	21	22	23
1	14	(Poland) (1) Tomasz Gollob	20				2		0					3		3							3	11	2		3	3
2	11	(Australia) (3) Jason Crump	18			2				3		3					2						2	12	1	2		2
3	1	(Australia) (8) Chris Holder	14	2				3				2				1				2				10	5		2	1
4	10	(United States) (5) Greg Hancock	13			3			1						1			2		3				10	4	3		0
5	2	(Poland) (2) Jarosław Hampel	12	1					2				2				3				3			11	3		1
6	15	(Sweden) (11) Fredrik Lindgren	9				1			2			3						1	1				8	6	1
7	16	(United Kingdom) (6) Chris Harris	7				0				3	Fx						3			1			7	7	0
8	6	(Denmark) (10) Nicki Pedersen	7		1				3			Fx							3			Fx		7	8		0
9	8	(Russia) (13) Artem Laguta	7		3						2			2			0			0				7	9
10	13	(Sweden) (9) Andreas Jonsson	7				3	1							Fx		1					2		7	10
11	7	(Russia) (12) Emil Sayfutdinov	7		0					1					2	2					2			7	11
12	4	(Poland) (4) Rune Holta	6	0							1				3				2				0	6	12
13	5	(Denmark) (7) Kenneth Bjerre	6		2			2					1					0					1	6	13
14	3	(Sweden) (14) Antonio Lindbäck	5	3						0				0				1				1		5	14
15	12	(Poland) (15) Janusz Kołodziej	3			R					0		0			0						3		3	15
16	9	(Denmark) (16) Mikkel B. Jensen	2			1		0						1					0		0			2	16
17	17	(Denmark) (17) Michael Jepsen Jensen	-																					-	17
18	18	(Denmark) (18) Kenneth Arendt Larsen	-																					-	18
Placing	Draw	Rider	Total	1	2	3	4	5	6	7	8	9	10	11	12	13	14	15	16	17	18	19	20	Pts	Pos	21	22	23

e: retired or mechanical failure • m: exclusion for exceeding two minute time allowance • t: exclusion for touching the tapes • x: other exclusion • f: fell
ns: non-starter • nc: non-classify
Semi-finals: Heat 21: Riders placed 1st, 4th, 6th & 7th in the intermediate classification (after 20 heats)
Heat 22: Riders placed 2nd, 3rd, 5th & 8th in the intermediate classification (after 20 heats)
Big Final (heat 23): The first and second placed riders in each of the Semi-Finals

gate A – inside	gate B	gate C	gate D – outside

=== Heat after heat ===
1. (56,94) Lindbäck, Holder, Hampel, Holta
2. (56,09) Łaguta, Bjerre, Pedersen, Sayfutdinov
3. (56,43) Hancock, Crump, Jensen, Kołodziej (R)
4. (56,53) Jonsson, Gollob, Lindgren, Harris
5. (57,22) Holder, Bjerre, Jonsson, Jensen
6. (56,94) Pedersen, Hampel, Hancock, Gollob
7. (56,37) Crump, Lindgren, Sayfutdinov, Lindbäck
8. (57,09) Harris, Łaguta, Holta, Kołodziej
9. (57,19) Crump, Holder, Pedersen (Fx), Harris (Fx)
10. (56,97) Lindgren, Hampel, Bjerre, Kołodziej
11. (57,22) Gollob, Łaguta, Jensen, Lindbäck
12. (57,25) Holta, Sayfutdinov, Hancock, Jonsson (Fx)
13. (56,21) Gollob, Sayfutdinov, Holder, Kołodziej
14. (56,41) Hampel, Crump, Jonsson, Łaguta
15. (57,07) Harris, Hancock, Lindbäck, Bjerre
16. (56,81) Pedersen, Holta, Lindgren, Jensen
17. (57,32) Hancock, Holder, Lindgren, Łaguta
18. (57,57) Hampel, Sayfutdinov, Harris, Jensen
19. (57,65) Kołodziej, Jonsson, Lindbäck, Pedersen (Fx)
20. (57,37) Gollob, Crump, Bjerre, Holta
  Semi-Finals:
21. (56,87) Hancock, Crump, Lindgren, Harris
22. (56,28) Gollob, Holder, Hampel, Pedersen
  the Final:
23. (56,50) Gollob (6 points), Crump (4), Holder (2), Hancock (0)

== The intermediate classification ==
Qualifies for next season's Grand Prix series
Full-time Grand Prix rider
Wild card, track reserve or qualified reserve

Pos.	Rider	Points	EUR (Poland)	SWE (Sweden)	CZE (Czech Republic)	DEN (Denmark)	GBR (United Kingdom)	ITA (Italy)	SCA (Sweden)	POL (Poland)	NOR (Denmark)	CRO (Croatia)	PL2 (Poland)
1	(Poland) (1) Tomasz Gollob	61	18	6	17	20							
2	(United States) (5) Greg Hancock	60	14	10	23	13							
3	(Poland) (2) Jarosław Hampel	48	12	5	19	12							
4	(Australia) (3) Jason Crump	42	5	6	13	18							
5	(Australia) (8) Chris Holder	42	9	10	9	14							
6	(Denmark) (10) Nicki Pedersen	37	17	4	9	7							
7	(Sweden) (11) Fredrik Lindgren	35	11	6	9	9							
8	(Russia) (12) Emil Sayfutdinov	35	14	8	6	7							
9	(Denmark) (7) Kenneth Bjerre	27	10	2	9	6							
10	(Sweden) (9) Andreas Jonsson	26	5	6	8	7							
11	(Poland) (4) Rune Holta	23	9	1	7	6							
12	(United Kingdom) (6) Chris Harris	21	7	4	3	7							
13	(Sweden) (14) Antonio Lindbäck	21	1	9	6	5							
14	(Poland) (15) Janusz Kołodziej	21	8	9	1	3							
15	(Russia) (13) Artem Laguta	10	0	1	2	7							
16	(Sweden) (16) Thomas H. Jonasson	8	–	8	–	–							
17	(Poland) (16) Damian Baliński	4	4	–	–	–							
18	(Czech Republic) (16) Matěj Kůs	3	–	–	3	–							
19	(Denmark) (16) Mikkel B. Jensen	2	–	–	–	2							
20	(Sweden) (17) Simon Gustafsson	1	–	1	–	–							
21	(Sweden) (18) Dennis Andersson	0	–	0	–	–							
Rider(s) not classified
	(Poland) (17) Patryk Dudek	—	ns	–	–	–							
	(Poland) (18) Maciej Janowski	—	ns	–	–	–							
	(Czech Republic) (17) Lukáš Dryml	—	–	–	ns	–							
	(Czech Republic) (18) Zdeněk Simota	—	–	–	ns	–							
	(Denmark) (17) Michael Jepsen Jensen	—	–	–	–	ns							
	(Denmark) (18) Kenneth Arendt Larsen	—	–	–	–	ns							
Pos.	Rider	Points	EUR (Poland)	SWE (Sweden)	CZE (Czech Republic)	DEN (Denmark)	GBR (United Kingdom)	ITA (Italy)	SCA (Sweden)	POL (Poland)	NOR (Denmark)	CRO (Croatia)	PL2 (Poland)

== See also ==
- motorcycle speedway
