= 2011 Speedway Grand Prix =

17th season of the Speedway Grand Prix

Season details
- Dates: 30 April — 8 October
- Events: 11
- Cities: 11
- Countries: 7
- Riders: 15 permanents 1 wild card(s); 2 track reserves
- Heats: 239 (in 11 events)

Winners
- Champion: USA Greg Hancock
- Runner-up: SWE Andreas Jonsson
- 3rd place: POL Jarosław Hampel

The 2011 Speedway Grand Prix was the 66th edition of the official World Championship and the 17th season of the Speedway Grand Prix era, deciding the FIM Speedway World Championship. It was the eleventh series under the promotion of Benfield Sports International, an IMG company. The series began on 30 April in Leszno and finished on 8 October in Gorzów.

Forty-one-year-old American Greg Hancock won his second Speedway World Championship, 14 years after his first gold medal in 1997. The Swedish rider Andreas Jonsson won his first World Championship medal after finishing first in three events. Polish Jarosław Hampel won the bronze medal and made it his second medal in the Speedway Grand Prix era.

== Qualification ==
For the 2011 season there was 15 permanent riders, joined at each Grand Prix by one wild card and two track reserves.

=== 2010 Grand Prix ===
The top eight riders from the 2010 championship qualified as of right:

- (Poland) (1) Tomasz Gollob
- (Poland) (2) Jarosław Hampel
- (Australia) (3) Jason Crump
- (Poland) (4) Rune Holta
- (United States) (5) Greg Hancock
- (United Kingdom) (6) Chris Harris
- (Denmark) (7) Kenneth Bjerre
- (Australia) (8) Chris Holder

=== Grand Prix Challenge ===
The top eight riders from the 2010 championship were joined by three riders who qualified via the Grand Prix Challenge.

- (Russia) (13) Artem Laguta
- (Sweden) (14) Antonio Lindbäck
- (Sweden) (11) Fredrik Lindgren

=== Nominations ===
The final four riders were nominated by series promoters, Benfield Sports International, following the completion of the 2010 season.

- (Sweden) (9) Andreas Jonsson
- (Denmark) (10) Nicki Pedersen
- (Russia) (12) Emil Sayfutdinov
- (Poland) (15) Janusz Kołodziej

=== Qualified Substitutes ===
- (Sweden) (19) Magnus Zetterström
- (Sweden) (20) Thomas H. Jonasson
- (Denmark) (21) Niels Kristian Iversen
- (Ukraine) (22) Andriej Karpov
- (Russia) (23) Grigory Laguta
- (United Kingdom) (24) Simon Stead

== Calendar ==
Round	Date	City and venue	Winner	Runner-up	3rd placed	4th placed	Results
1	30 April	Leszno , Poland; Smoczyk Stadium	(Denmark) Nicki Pedersen	(Poland) Tomasz Gollob	(Russia) Emil Sayfutdinov	(Poland) Jarosław Hampel	results
2	14 May	(Sweden) Gothenburg , Sweden; Ullevi	(Australia) Chris Holder	(United States) Greg Hancock	(Sweden) Antonio Lindbäck	(Poland) Janusz Kołodziej	results
3	28 May	(Czech Republic) Prague , Czech Republic; Markéta Stadium	(United States) Greg Hancock	(Poland) Jarosław Hampel	(Poland) Tomasz Gollob	(Australia) Jason Crump	results
4	11 June	(Denmark) Copenhagen , Denmark; Parken Stadium	(Poland) Tomasz Gollob	(Australia) Jason Crump	(Australia) Chris Holder	(United States) Greg Hancock	results
5	25 June	(United Kingdom) Cardiff , Great Britain; Millennium Stadium	(United States) Greg Hancock	(Denmark) Nicki Pedersen	(Australia) Chris Holder	(Russia) Emil Sayfutdinov	results
6	30 July	(Italy) Terenzano , Italy; Pista Olimpia Terenzano	(Sweden) Andreas Jonsson	(United States) Greg Hancock	(Sweden) Antonio Lindbäck	(Denmark) Kenneth Bjerre	results
7	13 August	Målilla , Sweden; G&B Stadium	(Poland) Jarosław Hampel	(Sweden) Andreas Jonsson	(Denmark) Kenneth Bjerre	(Russia) Emil Sayfutdinov	results
8	27 August	(Poland) Toruń , Poland; MotoArena Toruń	(Sweden) Andreas Jonsson	(Poland) Jarosław Hampel	(Australia) Darcy Ward	(Sweden) Antonio Lindbäck	results
9	10 September	(Denmark) Vojens , Denmark; Speedway Center	(United States) Greg Hancock	(Australia) Jason Crump	(Sweden) Fredrik Lindgren	(Australia) Chris Holder	results
10	24 September	(Croatia) Goričan , Croatia; Stadium Milenium	(Sweden) Andreas Jonsson	(United Kingdom) Chris Harris	(Sweden) Fredrik Lindgren	(United States) Greg Hancock	results
11	8 October	Gorzów Wlkp. , Poland; Jancarz Stadium	(United States) Greg Hancock	(Denmark) Nicki Pedersen	(Russia) Emil Sayfutdinov	(Poland) Tomasz Gollob	results

== Classification ==
Qualifies for next season's Grand Prix series
Full-time Grand Prix rider
Wild card, track reserve or qualified reserve

Pos.	Rider	Points	EUR (Poland)	SWE (Sweden)	CZE (Czech Republic)	DEN (Denmark)	GBR (United Kingdom)	ITA (Italy)	SCA (Sweden)	POL (Poland)	NOR (Denmark)	CRO (Croatia)	PL2 (Poland)
Gold	(United States) (5) Greg Hancock	165	14	10	23	13	20	15	9	13	22	15	11
Silver	(Sweden) (9) Andreas Jonsson	125	5	6	8	7	10	17	19	20	8	18	7
Bronze	(Poland) (2) Jarosław Hampel	123	12	5	19	12	5	12	17	18	8	9	6
4	(Australia) (3) Jason Crump	110	5	6	13	18	8	6	16	7	17	8	6
5	(Poland) (1) Tomasz Gollob	106	18	6	17	20	7	5	3	12	5	5	8
6	(Russia) (12) Emil Sayfutdinov	106	14	8	6	7	13	11	13	7	9	10	8
7	(Denmark) (7) Kenneth Bjerre	101	10	2	9	6	11	12	16	6	13	12	4
8	(Australia) (8) Chris Holder	101	9	10	9	14	15	6	7	7	11	7	6
9	(Sweden) (11) Fredrik Lindgren	90	11	6	9	9	5	7	8	5	13	12	5
10	(Denmark) (10) Nicki Pedersen	89	17	4	9	7	16	3	3	6	10	4	10
11	(United Kingdom) (6) Chris Harris	74	7	4	3	7	6	6	10	0	5	19	7
12	(Sweden) (14) Antonio Lindbäck	72	1	9	6	5	3	17	7	12	6	3	3
13	(Poland) (4) Rune Holta	53	9	1	7	6	1	5	4	8	3	9	0
14	(Poland) (15) Janusz Kołodziej	50	8	9	1	3	7	10	1	–	2	4	5
15	(Russia) (13) Artem Laguta	28	0	1	2	7	–	–	1	1	9	4	3
16	(Australia) (16) Darcy Ward	22	–	–	–	–	–	–	–	15	–	–	7
17	(Sweden) (19) Magnus Zetterström	19	–	–	–	–	9	3	–	7	–	–	–
18	(Sweden) (16) Thomas H. Jonasson	17	–	8	–	–	–	–	9	–	–	–	–
19	(Slovenia) (16) Matej Žagar	14	–	–	–	–	–	9	–	–	–	5	–
20	(United Kingdom) (16) Scott Nicholls	5	–	–	–	–	5	–	–	–	–	–	–
21	(Poland) (16) Damian Baliński	4	4	–	–	–	–	–	–	–	–	–	–
22	(Czech Republic) (16) Matěj Kůs	3	–	–	3	–	–	–	–	–	–	–	–
23	(Denmark) (16) Bjarne Pedersen	3	–	–	–	–	–	–	–	–	3	–	–
24	(Denmark) (16) Mikkel B. Jensen	2	–	–	–	2	–	–	–	–	–	–	–
25	(United Kingdom) (17) Tai Woffinden	2	–	–	–	–	2	–	–	–	–	–	–
26	(Sweden) (17) Simon Gustafsson	1	–	1	–	–	–	–	ns	–	–	–	–
27	(Sweden) (18) Dennis Andersson	0	–	0	–	–	–	–	–	–	–	–	–
Rider(s) not classified
	(Poland) (17) Patryk Dudek	—	ns	–	–	–	–	–	–	–	–	–	–
	(Poland) (18) Maciej Janowski	—	ns	–	–	–	–	–	–	–	–	–	–
	(Czech Republic) (17) Lukáš Dryml	—	–	–	ns	–	–	–	–	–	–	–	–
	(Czech Republic) (18) Zdeněk Simota	—	–	–	ns	–	–	–	–	–	–	–	–
	(Denmark) (17) Michael Jepsen Jensen	—	–	–	–	ns	–	–	–	–	–	–	–
	(Denmark) (18) Kenni Larsen	—	–	–	–	ns	–	–	–	–	–	–	–
	(United Kingdom) (18) Ben Barker	—	–	–	–	–	ns	–	–	–	–	–	–
	(Italy) (17) Mattia Carpanese	—	–	–	–	–	–	ns	–	–	–	–	–
	(Italy) (18) Guglielmo Franchetti	—	–	–	–	–	–	ns	–	–	–	–	–
	(Sweden) (18) Linus Sundström	—	–	–	–	–	–	–	ns	–	–	–	–
	(Poland) (17) Piotr Pawlicki, Jr.	—	–	–	–	–	–	–	–	ns	–	–	–
	(Poland) (18) Emil Pulczyński	—	–	–	–	–	–	–	–	ns	–	–	–
	(Denmark) (17) Michael Jepsen Jensen	—	–	–	–	–	–	–	–	–	ns	–	–
	(Denmark) (18) Mikkel Michelsen	—	–	–	–	–	–	–	–	–	ns	–	–
	(Croatia) (17) Dino Kovačić	—	–	–	–	–	–	–	–	–	–	ns	–
	(Slovenia) (18) Matija Duh	—	–	–	–	–	–	–	–	–	–	ns	–
	(Poland) (17) Bartosz Zmarzlik	—	–	–	–	–	–	–	–	–	–	–	ns
	(Poland) (18) Kamil Pulczyński	—	–	–	–	–	–	–	–	–	–	–	ns
Pos.	Rider	Points	EUR (Poland)	SWE (Sweden)	CZE (Czech Republic)	DEN (Denmark)	GBR (United Kingdom)	ITA (Italy)	SCA (Sweden)	POL (Poland)	NOR (Denmark)	CRO (Croatia)	PL2 (Poland)

== See also ==
- 2011 Individual Speedway Junior World Championship
