= 2011 Speedway Grand Prix of Great Britain =

Speedway race in Cardiff, Wales

(United Kingdom) 2011 Speedway Grand Prix of Great Britain
- FIM Doodson British Speedway Grand Prix

Information
- Date: 25 June 2011
- City: (United Kingdom) (Wales) Cardiff
- Event: 5 of 11 (138)
- Referee: (Poland) Wojciech Grodzki
- Jury President: (Italy) Armando Castagna

Stadium details
- Stadium: Millennium Stadium
- Length: 277 m (303 yd)

SGP Results
- Attendance: 43,640
- Best Time: (Australia) Chris Holder; 55,3 secs (in Heat 22)
- (gold) Winner: (United States) Greg Hancock
- (silver) Runner-up: (Denmark) Nicki Pedersen
- (bronze) 3rd place: (Australia) Chris Holder

The 2011 Speedway Grand Prix of Great Britain, also known as the 2011 FIM Doodson British Speedway Grand Prix for sponsorship reasons, was the fifth race of the 2011 Speedway Grand Prix season. It took place on 25 June at the Millennium Stadium in Cardiff, Great Britain.

== Riders ==
The Speedway Grand Prix Commission nominated Scott Nicholls as Wild Card, and Tai Woffinden and Ben Barker both as Track Reserves. Because Artem Laguta did not have a valid visa, he could not enter into the United Kingdom. He was replaced by first Qualified Substitutes, Magnus Zetterström of Sweden. Another Russian rider, Emil Sayfutdinov, has Polish citizenship also. The Draw was made on 24 June by the Jury President, Armando Castagna.

(13) (Russia) Artem Laguta → (19) (Sweden) Magnus Zetterström

== Results ==
The Grand Prix was won by Greg Hancock who beat Nicki Pedersen, Chris Holder and Emil Sayfutdinov in the final. Hancock becoming World Championship leader.

=== Heat details ===
Placing	Draw	Rider	Total	1	2	3	4	5	6	7	8	9	10	11	12	13	14	15	16	17	18	19	20	Pts	Pos	21	22	23
1	8	(United States) (5) Greg Hancock	20		2						3			1			3			3				12	1	2		3
2	11	(Denmark) (10) Nicki Pedersen	16			3				2		3					2						T/-	10	5		2	2
3	14	(Australia) (8) Chris Holder	15				0		1					3		3							3	10	3		3	1
4	10	(Russia) (12) Emil Sayfutdinov	13			0			2						3			3		2				10	4	3		Fx
5	6	(Denmark) (7) Kenneth Bjerre	11		1				3			2							3			2		11	2		T
6	16	(Sweden) (9) Andreas Jonsson	10				2				2	1						1			3			9	6	1
7	3	(Sweden) (19) Magnus Zetterström	9	2						3				0				2				1		8	8		1
8	4	(Australia) (3) Jason Crump	8	3							0				2				2				1	8	7	0
9	9	(Poland) (15) Janusz Kołodziej	7			2		3						2					0		0			7	9
10	7	(Poland) (1) Tomasz Gollob	7		3					0					1	1					2			7	10
11	2	(United Kingdom) (6) Chris Harris	6	1					0				3				1				1			6	11
12	12	(Poland) (2) Jarosław Hampel	5			1					1		R			0						3		5	12
13	1	(United Kingdom) (16) Scott Nicholls	5	0				2				0				2				1				5	13
14	15	(Sweden) (11) Fredrik Lindgren	5				1			1			2						1	X				5	14
15	13	(Sweden) (14) Antonio Lindbäck	3				3	0							0		0					0		3	15
16	17	(United Kingdom) (17) Tai Woffinden	2																				2	2	16
17	5	(Poland) (4) Rune Holta	1		0			1					Fx					0					0	1	17
18	18	(United Kingdom) (18) Ben Barker	-																					-	18
Placing	Draw	Rider	Total	1	2	3	4	5	6	7	8	9	10	11	12	13	14	15	16	17	18	19	20	Pts	Pos	21	22	23

e: retired or mechanical failure • m: exclusion for exceeding two minute time allowance • t: exclusion for touching the tapes • x: other exclusion • f: fell
ns: non-starter • nc: non-classify
Semi-finals: Heat 21: Riders placed 1st, 4th, 6th & 7th in the intermediate classification (after 20 heats)
Heat 22: Riders placed 2nd, 3rd, 5th & 8th in the intermediate classification (after 20 heats)
Big Final (heat 23): The first and second placed riders in each of the Semi-Finals

gate A – inside	gate B	gate C	gate D – outside

=== Heat after heat ===
1. (56,2) Crump, Zetterström, Harris, Nicholls
2. (56,0) Gollob, Hancock, Bjerre, Holta
3. (56,1) Pedersen, Kołodziej, Hampel, Sayfutdinov
4. (56,7) Lindbäck, Jonsson, Lindgren, Holder
5. (56,3) Kołodziej, Nicholls, Holta, Lindbäck
6. (56,0) Bjerre, Sayfutdinov, Holder, Harris
7. (56,9) Zetterström, Pedersen, Lindgren, Gollob
8. (56,6) Hancock, Jonsson, Hampel, Crump
9. (56,2) Pedersen, Bjerre, Jonsson, Nicholls
10. (57,0) Harris, Lindgren, Holta (Fx), Hampel (X)
11. (56,1) Holder, Kołodziej, Hancock, Zetterström
12. (56,7) Sayfutdinov, Crump, Gollob, Lindbäck
13. (55,6) Holder, Nicholls, Gollob, Hampel
14. (56,3) Hancock, Pedersen, Harris, Lindbäck
15. (56,3) Sayfutdinov, Zetterström, Jonsson, Holta
16. (56,7) Bjerre, Crump, Lindgren, Kołodziej
17. (56,0) Hancock, Sayfutdinov, Nicholls, Lindgren (X)
18. (56,8) Jonsson, Gollob, Harris, Kołodziej
19. (56,0) Hampel, Bjerre, Zetterström, Lindbäck
20. (56,4) Holder, Woffinden, Crump, Holta (Pedersen - R)
  Semi-Finals:
21. (55,6) Sayfutdinov, Hancock, Jonsson, Crump
22. (55,3) Holder, Pedersen, Zetterström, Bjerre (R)
  the Final:
23. (55,8) Hancock, Pedersen, Holder, Sayfutdinov (Fx)

== The intermediate classification ==
Qualifies for next season's Grand Prix series
Full-time Grand Prix rider
Wild card, track reserve or qualified reserve

Pos.	Rider	Points	EUR (Poland)	SWE (Sweden)	CZE (Czech Republic)	DEN (Denmark)	GBR (United Kingdom)	ITA (Italy)	SCA (Sweden)	POL (Poland)	NOR (Denmark)	CRO (Croatia)	PL2 (Poland)
1	(United States) (5) Greg Hancock	80	14	10	23	13	20						
2	(Poland) (1) Tomasz Gollob	68	18	6	17	20	7						
3	(Australia) (8) Chris Holder	57	9	10	9	14	15						
4	(Poland) (2) Jarosław Hampel	53	12	5	19	12	5						
5	(Denmark) (10) Nicki Pedersen	53	17	4	9	7	16						
6	(Australia) (3) Jason Crump	50	5	6	13	18	8						
7	(Russia) (12) Emil Sayfutdinov	48	14	8	6	7	13						
8	(Sweden) (11) Fredrik Lindgren	40	11	6	9	9	5						
9	(Denmark) (7) Kenneth Bjerre	38	10	2	9	6	11						
10	(Sweden) (9) Andreas Jonsson	36	5	6	8	7	10						
11	(Poland) (15) Janusz Kołodziej	28	8	9	1	3	7						
12	(United Kingdom) (6) Chris Harris	27	7	4	3	7	6						
13	(Poland) (4) Rune Holta	24	9	1	7	6	1						
13	(Sweden) (14) Antonio Lindbäck	24	1	9	6	5	3						
15	(Russia) (13) Artem Laguta	10	0	1	2	7	–						
16	(Sweden) (19) Magnus Zetterström	9	–	–	–	–	9						
17	(Sweden) (16) Thomas H. Jonasson	8	–	8	–	–	–						
18	(United Kingdom) (16) Scott Nicholls	5	–	–	–	–	5						
19	(Poland) (16) Damian Baliński	4	4	–	–	–	–						
20	(Czech Republic) (16) Matěj Kůs	3	–	–	3	–	–						
21	(Denmark) (16) Mikkel B. Jensen	2	–	–	–	2	–						
22	(United Kingdom) (17) Tai Woffinden	2	–	–	–	–	2						
23	(Sweden) (17) Simon Gustafsson	1	–	1	–	–	–						
24	(Sweden) (18) Dennis Andersson	0	–	0	–	–	–						
Rider(s) not classified
	(Poland) (17) Patryk Dudek	—	ns	–	–	–	–						
	(Poland) (18) Maciej Janowski	—	ns	–	–	–	–						
	(Czech Republic) (17) Lukáš Dryml	—	–	–	ns	–	–						
	(Czech Republic) (18) Zdeněk Simota	—	–	–	ns	–	–						
	(Denmark) (17) Michael Jepsen Jensen	—	–	–	–	ns	–						
	(Denmark) (18) Kenneth Arendt Larsen	—	–	–	–	ns	–						
	(United Kingdom) (18) Ben Barker	—	–	–	–	–	ns						
Pos.	Rider	Points	EUR (Poland)	SWE (Sweden)	CZE (Czech Republic)	DEN (Denmark)	GBR (United Kingdom)	ITA (Italy)	SCA (Sweden)	POL (Poland)	NOR (Denmark)	CRO (Croatia)	PL2 (Poland)

== See also ==
- motorcycle speedway
