= 2011 Speedway Grand Prix of Italy =

- 2011 FIM Nice Italian Speedway Grand Prix

Information
- Date: 30 July 2011
- City: (Italy) Terenzano
- Event: 6 of 11 (139)
- Referee: (Germany) Frank Ziegler
- Jury President: (Sweden) Christer Bergstrom

Stadium details
- Stadium: Pista Olimpia Terenzano
- Length: 400 m (440 yd)

SGP Results
- Attendance: 3,000
- Best Time: (Poland) Jarosław Hampel; 72,25 secs (in Heat 6)
- (gold) Winner: (Sweden) Andreas Jonsson
- (silver) Runner-up: (United States) Greg Hancock
- (bronze) 3rd place: (Sweden) Antonio Lindback

The 2011 FIM Nice Italian Speedway Grand Prix was the sixth race of the 2011 Speedway Grand Prix season. It took place on 30 July at the Pista Olimpia Terenzano stadium in Terenzano, Italy.

== Riders ==
The Speedway Grand Prix Commission nominated Matej Žagar as Wild Card, and Mattia Carpanese and Guglielmo Franchetti both as Track Reserves. Injury Artem Laguta was replaced by first Qualified Substitutes, Magnus Zetterström. The Draw was made on 29 July at 13:00 CEST.

(13) (Russia) Artem Laguta → (19) (Sweden) Magnus Zetterström

== Results ==
The Grand Prix was won by Andreas Jonsson, who beat World Championship leader Greg Hancock, Antonio Lindbäck and Kenneth Bjerre in the final.

=== Heat details ===
Placing	Draw	Rider	Total	1	2	3	4	5	6	7	8	9	10	11	12	13	14	15	16	17	18	19	20	Pts	Pos	21	22	23
1	13	(Sweden) (9) Andreas Jonsson	17				3	2							1		2					1		9	7	2		3
2	7	(United States) (5) Greg Hancock	15		1					0					3	3					1			8	8		3	2
3	9	(Sweden) (14) Antonio Lindbäck	17			2		3						1					3		3			12	1	3		1
4	2	(Denmark) (7) Kenneth Bjerre	12	0					2				3				3				2			10	3		2	0
5	10	(Poland) (2) Jarosław Hampel	12			3			3						2			0		3				11	2		1
6	3	(Russia) (12) Emil Sayfutdinov	11	1						2				3				1				3		10	4	1
7	5	(Poland) (15) Janusz Kołodziej	10		3			1					2					2					2	10	5		0
8	4	(Slovenia) (16) Matej Žagar	9	3							3				0				2				1	9	6	0
9	14	(Sweden) (11) Fredrik Lindgren	7				2		0					R4		2							3	7	9
10	16	(Australia) (3) Jason Crump	6				0				0	3						3			0			6	10
11	11	(United Kingdom) (6) Chris Harris	6			1				3		1					1						0	6	11
12	8	(Australia) (8) Chris Holder	6		2						2			2			0			0				6	12
13	6	(Poland) (1) Tomasz Gollob	5		0				1			2							0			2		5	13
14	15	(Poland) (4) Rune Holta	5				1			1			0						1	2				5	14
15	1	(Sweden) (19) Magnus Zetterström	3	2				0				0				0				1				3	15
16	12	(Denmark) (10) Nicki Pedersen	3			0					1		1			1						0		3	16
17	17	(Italy) (17) Mattia Carpanese	-																					-	17
18	18	(Italy) (18) Guglielmo Franchetti	-																					-	18
Placing	Draw	Rider	Total	1	2	3	4	5	6	7	8	9	10	11	12	13	14	15	16	17	18	19	20	Pts	Pos	21	22	23

e: retired or mechanical failure • m: exclusion for exceeding two minute time allowance • t: exclusion for touching the tapes • x: other exclusion • f: fell
ns: non-starter • nc: non-classify
Semi-finals: Heat 21: Riders placed 1st, 4th, 6th & 7th in the intermediate classification (after 20 heats)
Heat 22: Riders placed 2nd, 3rd, 5th & 8th in the intermediate classification (after 20 heats)
Big Final (heat 23): The first and second placed riders in each of the Semi-Finals

gate A – inside	gate B	gate C	gate D – outside

=== Heat after heat ===
1. (74,56) Žagar, Zetterström, Sayfutdinov, Bjerre
2. (73,38) Kołodziej, Holder, Hancock, Gollob
3. (73,31) Hampel, Lindbäck, Harris, Pedersen
4. (73,31) Jonsson, Lindgren, Holta, Crump
5. (72,60) Lindbäck, Jonsson, Kołodziej, Zetterström
6. (72,25) Hampel, Bjerre, Gollob, Lindgren
7. (72,57) Harris, Sayfutdinov, Holta, Hancock
8. (74,06) Žagar, Holder, Pedersen, Crump
9. (72,81) Crump, Gollob, Harris, Zetterström
10. (73,00) Bjerre, Kołodziej, Pedersen, Holta
11. (73,41) Sayfutdinov, Holder, Lindbäck, Lindgren (R4)
12. (73,88) Hancock, Hampel, Jonsson, Žagar
13. (73,43) Hancock, Lindgren, Pedersen, Zetterström
14. (73,28) Bjerre, Jonsson, Harris, Holder
15. (74,00) Crump, Kołodziej, Sayfutdinov, Hampel
16. (74,66) Lindbäck, Žagar, Holta, Gollob
17. (74,53) Hampel, Holta, Zetterström, Holder
18. (74,75) Lindbäck, Bjerre, Hancock, Crump
19. (75,22) Sayfutdinov, Gollob, Jonsson, Pedersen
20. (75,12) Lindgren, Kołodziej, Žagar, Harris
  Semi-Finals:
21. (74,35) Lindbaeck, Jonsson, Sayfutdinov, Žagar
22. (74,81) Hancock, Bjerre, Hampel, Kołodziej
  the Final:
23. (75,44) Jonsson (6 points), Hancock (4), Lindbaeck (2), Bjerre (0)

== The intermediate classification ==
Qualifies for next season's Grand Prix series
Full-time Grand Prix rider
Wild card, track reserve or qualified reserve

Pos.	Rider	Points	EUR (Poland)	SWE (Sweden)	CZE (Czech Republic)	DEN (Denmark)	GBR (United Kingdom)	ITA (Italy)	SCA (Sweden)	POL (Poland)	NOR (Denmark)	CRO (Croatia)	PL2 (Poland)
1	(United States) (5) Greg Hancock	95	14	10	23	13	20	15					
2	(Poland) (1) Tomasz Gollob	73	18	6	17	20	7	5					
3	(Poland) (2) Jarosław Hampel	65	12	5	19	12	5	12					
4	(Australia) (8) Chris Holder	63	9	10	9	14	15	6					
5	(Russia) (12) Emil Sayfutdinov	59	14	8	6	7	13	11					
6	(Australia) (3) Jason Crump	56	5	6	13	18	8	6					
7	(Denmark) (10) Nicki Pedersen	56	17	4	9	7	16	3					
8	(Sweden) (9) Andreas Jonsson	53	5	6	8	7	10	17					
9	(Denmark) (7) Kenneth Bjerre	50	10	2	9	6	11	12					
10	(Sweden) (11) Fredrik Lindgren	47	11	6	9	9	5	7					
11	(Sweden) (14) Antonio Lindbäck	41	1	9	6	5	3	17					
12	(Poland) (15) Janusz Kołodziej	38	8	9	1	3	7	10					
13	(United Kingdom) (6) Chris Harris	33	7	4	3	7	6	6					
14	(Poland) (4) Rune Holta	29	9	1	7	6	1	5					
15	(Sweden) (19) Magnus Zetterström	12	–	–	–	–	9	3					
16	(Russia) (13) Artem Laguta	10	0	1	2	7	–	–					
17	(Slovenia) (16) Matej Žagar	9	–	–	–	–	–	9					
18	(Sweden) (16) Thomas H. Jonasson	8	–	8	–	–	–	–					
19	(United Kingdom) (16) Scott Nicholls	5	–	–	–	–	5	–					
20	(Poland) (16) Damian Baliński	4	4	–	–	–	–	–					
21	(Czech Republic) (16) Matěj Kůs	3	–	–	3	–	–	–					
22	(Denmark) (16) Mikkel B. Jensen	2	–	–	–	2	–	–					
23	(United Kingdom) (17) Tai Woffinden	2	–	–	–	–	2	–					
24	(Sweden) (17) Simon Gustafsson	1	–	1	–	–	–	–					
25	(Sweden) (18) Dennis Andersson	0	–	0	–	–	–	–					
Rider(s) not classified
	(Poland) (17) Patryk Dudek	—	ns	–	–	–	–	–					
	(Poland) (18) Maciej Janowski	—	ns	–	–	–	–	–					
	(Czech Republic) (17) Lukáš Dryml	—	–	–	ns	–	–	–					
	(Czech Republic) (18) Zdeněk Simota	—	–	–	ns	–	–	–					
	(Denmark) (17) Michael Jepsen Jensen	—	–	–	–	ns	–	–					
	(Denmark) (18) Kenneth Arendt Larsen	—	–	–	–	ns	–	–					
	(United Kingdom) (18) Ben Barker	—	–	–	–	–	ns	–					
	(Italy) (17) Mattia Carpanese	—	–	–	–	–	–	ns					
	(Italy) (18) Guglielmo Franchetti	—	–	–	–	–	–	ns					
Pos.	Rider	Points	EUR (Poland)	SWE (Sweden)	CZE (Czech Republic)	DEN (Denmark)	GBR (United Kingdom)	ITA (Italy)	SCA (Sweden)	POL (Poland)	NOR (Denmark)	CRO (Croatia)	PL2 (Poland)

== See also ==
- motorcycle speedway
