= 2011 Speedway Grand Prix of Nordic =

(Denmark) 2011 Speedway Grand Prix of Nordic
- 2011 FIM Dansk Metal Nordic Speedway Grand Prix

Information
- Date: 10 September 2011
- City: (Denmark) Vojens
- Event: 9 of 11 (142)
- Referee: (Germany) Frank Ziegler
- Jury President: (United Kingdom) Anthony Steele

Stadium details
- Stadium: Speedway Center
- Length: 300 m (330 yd)

SGP Results
- Attendance: 16,000
- Best Time: (Sweden) Andreas Jonsson; 58,89 secs (in Heat 6)
- (gold) Winner: (United States) Greg Hancock
- (silver) Runner-up: (Australia) Jason Crump
- (bronze) 3rd place: (Sweden) Fredrik Lindgren

The 2011 FIM Dansk Metal Nordic Speedway Grand Prix was the ninth race of the 2011 Speedway Grand Prix season. It took place on 10 September at the Speedway Center stadium in Vojens, Denmark.

== Riders ==
The Speedway Grand Prix Commission nominated Bjarne Pedersen as Wild Card, and Michael Jepsen Jensen and Mikkel Michelsen both as Track Reserves. The Draw was made on 9 September.

== Results ==
Grand Prix was won by Grag Hancock who beat Jason Crump, Fredrik Lindgren and Chris Harris in the final.

=== Heat details ===
Placing	Draw	Rider	Total	1	2	3	4	5	6	7	8	9	10	11	12	13	14	15	16	17	18	19	20	Pts	Pos	21	22	23
1	5	(United States) (5) Greg Hancock	22		3			3					1					3					3	13	1	3		3
2	16	(Australia) (3) Jason Crump	17				1				2	2						2			3			10	3		3	2
3	15	(Sweden) (11) Fredrik Lindgren	13				2			2			0						3	2				9	5		2	1
4	13	(Australia) (8) Chris Holder	11				3	2							1		2					1		9	6	2		0
5	11	(Denmark) (7) Kenneth Bjerre	13			3				1		3					3						2	12	2		1
6	7	(Denmark) (10) Nicki Pedersen	10		X					3					3	2					1			9	4	1
7	9	(Russia) (13) Artem Laguta	9			1		1						3					2		2			9	8		0
8	6	(Russia) (12) Emil Sayfutdinov	9		2				2			1							1			3		9	7	0
9	12	(Poland) (2) Jarosław Hampel	8			2					3		3			0						0		8	9
10	2	(Sweden) (9) Andreas Jonsson	8	2					3				2				1				0			8	10
11	4	(Sweden) (14) Antonio Lindbäck	6	3							1				2				0				0	6	11
12	10	(United Kingdom) (6) Chris Harris	5			0			1						0			1		3				5	12
13	1	(Poland) (1) Tomasz Gollob	5	1				0				0				3				1				5	13
14	8	(Denmark) (16) Bjarne Pedersen	3		1						0			2			0			0				3	14
15	3	(Poland) (4) Rune Holta	3	F						0				1				0				2		3	15
16	14	(Poland) (15) Janusz Kołodziej	2				0		0					0		1							1	2	16
17	17	(Denmark) (17) Michael Jepsen Jensen	-																					-	17
18	18	(Denmark) (18) Mikkel Michelsen	-																					-	18
Placing	Draw	Rider	Total	1	2	3	4	5	6	7	8	9	10	11	12	13	14	15	16	17	18	19	20	Pts	Pos	21	22	23

e: retired or mechanical failure • m: exclusion for exceeding two minute time allowance • t: exclusion for touching the tapes • x: other exclusion • f: fell
ns: non-starter • nc: non-classify
Semi-finals: Heat 21: Riders placed 1st, 4th, 6th & 7th in the intermediate classification (after 20 heats)
Heat 22: Riders placed 2nd, 3rd, 5th & 8th in the intermediate classification (after 20 heats)
Big Final (heat 23): The first and second placed riders in each of the Semi-Finals

gate A – inside	gate B	gate C	gate D – outside

=== Heat after heat ===
1. (59,54) Lindbäck, Jonsson, Gollob, Holta (F)
2. (59,23) Hancock, Sayfutdinov, B. Pedersen, N. Pedersen (X)
3. (59,39) Bjerre, Hampel, Łaguta, Harris
4. (59,91) Holder, Lindgren, Crump, Kołodziej
5. (60,72) Hancock, Holder, Łaguta, Gollob
6. (58,89) Jonsson, Sayfutdinov, Harris, Kołodziej
7. (60,28) N. Pedersen, Lindgren, Bjerre, Holta
8. (60,53) Hampel, Crump, Lindbäck, B. Pedersen
9. (60,16) Bjerre, Crump, Sayfutdinov, Gollob
10. (60,07) Hampel, Jonsson, Hancock, Lindgren
11. (60,59) Łaguta, B. Pedersen, Holta, Kołodziej
12. (60,88) N. Pedersen, Lindbäck, Holder, Harris
13. (60,92) Gollob, N. Pedersen, Kołodziej, Hampel
14. (60,84) Bjerre, Holder, Jonsson, B. Pedersen
15. (60,63) Hancock, Crump, Harris, Holta
16. (60,85) Lindgren, Łaguta, Sayfutdinov, Lindbäck
17. (61,07) Harris, Lindgren, Gollob, B. Pedersen
18. (61,17) Crump, Łaguta, N. Pedersen, Jonsson
19. (61,03) Sayfutdinov, Holta, Holder, Hampel
20. (60,91) Hancock, Bjerre, Kołodziej, Lindbäck
  Semi-finals:
21. (61,10) Hancock, Holder, N. Pedersen, Sayfutdinov
22. (61,13) Crump, Lindgren, Bjerre, Łaguta
  the Final:
23. (61,04) Hancock (6 points), Crump (4), Lindgren (2), Holder (0)

== The intermediate classification ==
Qualifies for next season's Grand Prix series
Full-time Grand Prix rider
Wild card, track reserve or qualified reserve

Pos.	Rider	Points	EUR (Poland)	SWE (Sweden)	CZE (Czech Republic)	DEN (Denmark)	GBR (United Kingdom)	ITA (Italy)	SCA (Sweden)	POL (Poland)	NOR (Denmark)	CRO (Croatia)	PL2 (Poland)
1	(United States) (5) Greg Hancock	139	14	10	23	13	20	15	9	13	22		
2	(Poland) (2) Jarosław Hampel	108	12	5	19	12	5	12	17	18	8		
3	(Sweden) (9) Andreas Jonsson	100	5	6	8	7	10	17	19	20	8		
4	(Australia) (3) Jason Crump	96	5	6	13	18	8	6	16	7	17		
5	(Poland) (1) Tomasz Gollob	93	18	6	17	20	7	5	3	12	5		
6	(Australia) (8) Chris Holder	88	9	10	9	14	15	6	7	7	11		
7	(Russia) (12) Emil Sayfutdinov	88	14	8	6	7	13	11	13	7	9		
8	(Denmark) (7) Kenneth Bjerre	85	10	2	9	6	11	12	16	6	13		
9	(Denmark) (10) Nicki Pedersen	75	17	4	9	7	16	3	3	6	10		
10	(Sweden) (11) Fredrik Lindgren	73	11	6	9	9	5	7	8	5	13		
11	(Sweden) (14) Antonio Lindbäck	66	1	9	6	5	3	17	7	12	6		
12	(United Kingdom) (6) Chris Harris	48	7	4	3	7	6	6	10	0	5		
13	(Poland) (4) Rune Holta	44	9	1	7	6	1	5	4	8	3		
14	(Poland) (15) Janusz Kołodziej	41	8	9	1	3	7	10	1	–	2		
15	(Russia) (13) Artem Laguta	21	0	1	2	7	–	–	1	1	9		
16	(Sweden) (19) Magnus Zetterström	19	–	–	–	–	9	3	–	7	–		
17	(Sweden) (16) Thomas H. Jonasson	17	–	8	–	–	–	–	9	–	–		
18	(Australia) (16) Darcy Ward	15	–	–	–	–	–	–	–	15	–		
19	(Slovenia) (16) Matej Žagar	9	–	–	–	–	–	9	–	–	–		
20	(United Kingdom) (16) Scott Nicholls	5	–	–	–	–	5	–	–	–	–		
21	(Poland) (16) Damian Baliński	4	4	–	–	–	–	–	–	–	–		
22	(Czech Republic) (16) Matěj Kůs	3	–	–	3	–	–	–	–	–	–		
23	(Denmark) (16) Bjarne Pedersen	3	–	–	–	–	–	–	–	–	3		
24	(Denmark) (16) Mikkel B. Jensen	2	–	–	–	2	–	–	–	–	–		
25	(United Kingdom) (17) Tai Woffinden	2	–	–	–	–	2	–	–	–	–		
26	(Sweden) (17) Simon Gustafsson	1	–	1	–	–	–	–	ns	–	–		
27	(Sweden) (18) Dennis Andersson	0	–	0	–	–	–	–	–	–	–		
Rider(s) not classified
	(Poland) (17) Patryk Dudek	—	ns	–	–	–	–	–	–	–	–		
	(Poland) (18) Maciej Janowski	—	ns	–	–	–	–	–	–	–	–		
	(Czech Republic) (17) Lukáš Dryml	—	–	–	ns	–	–	–	–	–	–		
	(Czech Republic) (18) Zdeněk Simota	—	–	–	ns	–	–	–	–	–	–		
	(Denmark) (17) Michael Jepsen Jensen	—	–	–	–	ns	–	–	–	–	ns		
	(Denmark) (18) Kenneth Arendt Larsen	—	–	–	–	ns	–	–	–	–	–		
	(United Kingdom) (18) Ben Barker	—	–	–	–	–	ns	–	–	–	–		
	(Italy) (17) Mattia Carpanese	—	–	–	–	–	–	ns	–	–	–		
	(Italy) (18) Guglielmo Franchetti	—	–	–	–	–	–	ns	–	–	–		
	(Sweden) (18) Linus Sundström	—	–	–	–	–	–	–	ns	–	–		
	(Poland) (17) Piotr Pawlicki, Jr.	—	–	–	–	–	–	–	–	ns	–		
	(Poland) (18) Emil Pulczyński	—	–	–	–	–	–	–	–	ns	–		
	(Denmark) (18) Mikkel Michelsen	—	–	–	–	–	–	–	–	–	ns		
Pos.	Rider	Points	EUR (Poland)	SWE (Sweden)	CZE (Czech Republic)	DEN (Denmark)	GBR (United Kingdom)	ITA (Italy)	SCA (Sweden)	POL (Poland)	NOR (Denmark)	CRO (Croatia)	PL2 (Poland)

== See also ==
- motorcycle speedway
