= 2011 Speedway Grand Prix of Czech Republic =

- 2011 FIM Mitas Czech Republic Speedway Grand Prix

Information
- Date: 28 May 2011
- City: (Czech Republic) Prague
- Event: 3 of 11 (136)
- Referee: (Germany) Frank Ziegler
- Jury President: (Finland) Ilkka Teromaa

Stadium details
- Stadium: Markéta Stadium
- Length: 353 m (386 yd)

SGP Results
- Attendance: 8,000
- Best Time: (United States) Greg Hancock; 65,03 secs (in Heat 4)
- (gold) Winner: (United States) Greg Hancock
- (silver) Runner-up: (Poland) Jarosław Hampel
- (bronze) 3rd place: (Poland) Tomasz Gollob

The 2011 FIM Mitas Czech Republic Speedway Grand Prix was the third race of the 2011 Speedway Grand Prix season. It took place on 28 May at the Markéta Stadium in Prague, Czech Republic.

== Riders ==
The Speedway Grand Prix Commission nominated Matěj Kůs as Wild Card, and Rafał Dobrucki and Lukáš Dryml both as Track Reserves. Dobrucki, seriously injured in the Polish Ekstraliga, will be replaced by Zdeněk Simota. The Draw was made on 27 May by Marie Kousalíková, Mayor of Prague 6 and Petr Svoboda, 2011 European Indoor 60 metres hurdles Champion.

Draw 17. (Poland) Rafał Dobrucki → (Czech Republic) Lukáš Dryml
Draw 18. (Czech Republic) Lukáš Dryml → (Czech Republic) Zdeněk Simota

== Results ==
The Grand Prix was won by Greg Hancock who beat Jarosław Hampel, current World Champion Tomasz Gollob and Jason Crump. Hancock becoming World Championship leader.

=== Heat details ===
Placing	Draw	Rider	Total	1	2	3	4	5	6	7	8	9	10	11	12	13	14	15	16	17	18	19	20	Pts	Pos	21	22	23
1	15	(United States) (5) Greg Hancock	23				3			2			3						3	3				14	1	3		3
2	13	(Poland) (2) Jarosław Hampel	19				2	3							3		3					2		13	2		2	2
3	8	(Poland) (1) Tomasz Gollob	17		3						3			3			2			1				12	3		3	1
4	11	(Australia) (3) Jason Crump	13			3				3		2					1						2	11	4	2		0
5	2	(Australia) (8) Chris Holder	9	3					3				1				0				2			9	5		Fx
6	9	(Denmark) (10) Nicki Pedersen	9			2		1						2					0		3			8	7	1
7	7	(Denmark) (7) Kenneth Bjerre	9		2					1					2	3					1			9	6	0
8	12	(Sweden) (11) Fredrik Lindgren	9			1					2		2			2						1		8	8		1
9	1	(Sweden) (9) Andreas Jonsson	8	2				2				1				1				2				8	9
10	3	(Poland) (4) Rune Holta	7	0						0				1				3				3		7	10
11	14	(Russia) (12) Emil Sayfutdinov	6				1		2					X		0							3	6	11
12	4	(Sweden) (14) Antonio Lindbäck	6	1							1				1				2				1	6	12
13	16	(Czech Republic) (16) Matěj Kůs	3				0				0	3						0			0			3	13
14	10	(United Kingdom) (6) Chris Harris	3			R			1						0			2		0				3	14
15	5	(Russia) (13) Artem Laguta	2		1			0					0					1					0	2	15
16	6	(Poland) (15) Janusz Kołodziej	1		0				0			0							1			0		1	16
17	17	(Czech Republic) (17) Lukáš Dryml	-																					-	17
18	18	(Czech Republic) (18) Zdeněk Simota	-																					-	18
Placing	Draw	Rider	Total	1	2	3	4	5	6	7	8	9	10	11	12	13	14	15	16	17	18	19	20	Pts	Pos	21	22	23

e: retired or mechanical failure • m: exclusion for exceeding two minute time allowance • t: exclusion for touching the tapes • x: other exclusion • f: fell
ns: non-starter • nc: non-classify
Semi-finals: Heat 21: Riders placed 1st, 4th, 6th & 7th in the intermediate classification (after 20 heats)
Heat 22: Riders placed 2nd, 3rd, 5th & 8th in the intermediate classification (after 20 heats)
Big Final (heat 23): The first and second placed riders in each of the Semi-Finals

gate A – inside	gate B	gate C	gate D – outside

=== Heat after heat ===
1. (66,03) Holder, Jonsson, Lindbaeck, Holta
2. (65,44) Gollob, Bjerre, Łaguta, Kołodziej
3. (65,23) Crump, Pedersen, Lindgren, Harris (R)
4. (65,03) Hancock, Hampel, Sajfutdinow, Kus
5. (65,09) Hampel, Jonsson, Pedersen, Łaguta
6. (65,66) Holder, Sajfutdinow, Harris, Kołodziej
7. (65,34) Crump, Hancock, Bjerre, Holta
8. (65,49) Gollob, Lindgren, Lindbaeck, Kus
9. (67,03) Kus, Crump, Jonsson, Kołodziej
10. (65,81) Hancock, Lindgren, Holder, Łaguta
11. (65,85) Gollob, Pedersen, Holta, Sajfutdinow (X)
12. (65,36) Hampel, Bjerre, Lindbaeck, Harris
13. (66,27) Bjerre, Lindgren, Jonsson, Sajfutdinow
14. (66,09) Hampel, Gollob, Crump, Holder
15. (66,47) Holta, Harris, Łaguta, Kus
16. (66,41) Hancock, Lindbaeck, Kołodziej, Pedersen
17. (66,44) Hancock, Jonsson, Gollob, Harris
18. (66,43) Pedersen, Holder, Bjerre, Kus
19. (66,07) Holta, Hampel, Lindgren, Kołodziej
20. (65,86) Sajfutdinow, Crump, Lindbaeck, Łaguta
  the Semi-Finals:
21. (66,07) Hancock, Crump, Pedersen, Bjerre
22. (66,33) Gollob, Hampel, Lindgren, Holder (Fx)
  the Final:
23. (66,13) Hancock (6 points), Hampel (4), Gollob (2), Crump (0)

== The intermediate classification ==
Qualifies for next season's Grand Prix series
Full-time Grand Prix rider
Wild card, track reserve or qualified reserve

Pos.	Rider	Points	EUR (Poland)	SWE (Sweden)	CZE (Czech Republic)	DEN (Denmark)	GBR (United Kingdom)	ITA (Italy)	SCA (Sweden)	POL (Poland)	NOR (Denmark)	CRO (Croatia)	PL2 (Poland)
1	(United States) (5) Greg Hancock	47	14	10	23								
2	(Poland) (1) Tomasz Gollob	41	18	6	17								
3	(Poland) (2) Jarosław Hampel	36	12	5	19								
4	(Denmark) (10) Nicki Pedersen	30	17	4	9								
5	(Australia) (8) Chris Holder	28	9	10	9								
6	(Russia) (12) Emil Sayfutdinov	28	14	8	6								
7	(Sweden) (11) Fredrik Lindgren	26	11	6	9								
8	(Australia) (3) Jason Crump	24	5	6	13								
9	(Denmark) (7) Kenneth Bjerre	21	10	2	9								
10	(Sweden) (9) Andreas Jonsson	19	5	6	8								
11	(Poland) (15) Janusz Kołodziej	18	8	9	1								
12	(Poland) (4) Rune Holta	17	9	1	7								
13	(Sweden) (14) Antonio Lindbäck	16	1	9	6								
14	(United Kingdom) (6) Chris Harris	14	7	4	3								
15	(Sweden) (16) Thomas H. Jonasson	8	–	8	–								
14	(Poland) (16) Damian Baliński	4	4	–	–								
16	(Russia) (13) Artem Laguta	3	0	1	2								
17	(Czech Republic) (16) Matěj Kůs	3	–	–	3								
18	(Sweden) (17) Simon Gustafsson	1	–	1	–								
19	(Sweden) (18) Dennis Andersson	0	–	0	–								
Rider(s) not classified
	(Poland) (17) Patryk Dudek	—	ns	–	–								
	(Poland) (18) Maciej Janowski	—	ns	–	–								
	(Czech Republic) (17) Lukáš Dryml	—	–	–	ns								
	(Czech Republic) (18) Zdeněk Simota	—	–	–	ns								
Pos.	Rider	Points	EUR (Poland)	SWE (Sweden)	CZE (Czech Republic)	DEN (Denmark)	GBR (United Kingdom)	ITA (Italy)	SCA (Sweden)	POL (Poland)	NOR (Denmark)	CRO (Croatia)	PL2 (Poland)

== See also ==
- motorcycle speedway
