= 2011 Speedway Grand Prix of Scandinavia =

(Sweden) 2011 Speedway Grand Prix of Scandinavia
- FIM Scandinavian Speedway Grand Prix

Information
- Date: 13 August 2011
- City: (Sweden) Målilla
- Event: 7 of 11 (140)
- Referee: (United Kingdom) Craig Ackroyd
- Jury President: (Finland) Ilkka Teromaa

Stadium details
- Stadium: G&B Stadium
- Length: 305 m (334 yd)

SGP Results
- Attendance: 12,732
- Best Time: (Poland) Jarosław Hampel; 55,70 secs (in Heat 3)
- (gold) Winner: (Poland) Jarosław Hampel
- (silver) Runner-up: (Sweden) Andreas Jonsson
- (bronze) 3rd place: (Denmark) Kenneth Bjerre

The FIM Scandinavian Speedway Grand Prix was the seventh race of the 2011 Speedway Grand Prix season. It took place on 13 August at the G&B Stadium in Målilla, Sweden.

== Riders ==
The Speedway Grand Prix Commission nominated Thomas H. Jonasson as Wild Card, and Simon Gustafsson and Linus Sundström both as Track Reserves. The Draw was made on 12 August.

== Results ==
The Grand Prix was won by Pole Jarosław Hampel who beat Andreas Jonsson, Kenneth Bjerre and Emil Sayfutdinov in the final.

== Heat details ==
Placing	Draw	Rider	Total	1	2	3	4	5	6	7	8	9	10	11	12	13	14	15	16	17	18	19	20	Pts	Pos	21	22	23
1	10	(Poland) (2) Jarosław Hampel	17			3			1						2			1		2				9	7	2		3
2	3	(Sweden) (9) Andreas Jonsson	19	3						2				3				2				3		13	2		2	2
3	6	(Denmark) (7) Kenneth Bjerre	16		2				3			3							3			X		11	3		3	1
4	14	(Russia) (12) Emil Sayfutdinov	13				3		2					2		3							X	10	4	3		0
5	5	(Australia) (3) Jason Crump	16		3			3					3					3					3	15	1	1
6	7	(United Kingdom) (6) Chris Harris	10		1					3					1	2					3			10	5		0
7	13	(Sweden) (16) Thomas H. Jonasson	9				Fx	1							3		3					2		9	6	0
8	15	(United States) (5) Greg Hancock	9				1			1			2						1	3				8	8		1
9	1	(Sweden) (11) Fredrik Lindgren	8	2				2				2				1				1				8	9
10	4	(Australia) (8) Chris Holder	7	1							3				0				2				1	7	10
11	11	(Sweden) (14) Antonio Lindbäck	7			2				0		1					2						2	7	11
12	16	(Poland) (4) Rune Holta	4				2				2	0						0			0			4	12
13	2	(Denmark) (10) Nicki Pedersen	3	0					0				1				0				2			3	13
14	8	(Poland) (1) Tomasz Gollob	3		0						1			1			1			R				3	14
15	9	(Russia) (13) Artem Laguta	1			0		0						0					0		1			1	15
16	12	(Poland) (15) Janusz Kołodziej	1			1					0		0			0						Fx		1	16
17	17	(Sweden) (17) Simon Gustafsson	-																					-	17
18	18	(Sweden) (18) Linus Sundström	-																					-	18
Placing	Draw	Rider	Total	1	2	3	4	5	6	7	8	9	10	11	12	13	14	15	16	17	18	19	20	Pts	Pos	21	22	23

e: retired or mechanical failure • m: exclusion for exceeding two minute time allowance • t: exclusion for touching the tapes • x: other exclusion • f: fell
ns: non-starter • nc: non-classify
Semi-finals: Heat 21: Riders placed 1st, 4th, 6th & 7th in the intermediate classification (after 20 heats)
Heat 22: Riders placed 2nd, 3rd, 5th & 8th in the intermediate classification (after 20 heats)
Big Final (heat 23): The first and second placed riders in each of the Semi-Finals

gate A – inside	gate B	gate C	gate D – outside

=== Heat after heat ===
1. (55,90) Jonsson, Lindgren, Holder, Pedersen
2. (56,17) Crump, Bjerre, Harris, Gollob
3. (55,70) Hampel, Lindbäck, Kołodziej, Łaguta
4. (56,10) Sayfutdinov, Holta, Hancock, Jonasson (Fx)
5. (55,96) Crump, Lindgren, Jonasson, Łaguta
6. (56,44) Bjerre, Sayfutdinov, Hampel, Pedersen
7. (56,73) Harris, Jonsson, Hancock, Lindbäck
8. (57,13) Holder, Holta, Gollob, Kołodziej
9. (57,19) Bjerre, Lindgren, Lindbäck, Holta
10. (57,68) Crump, Hancock, Pedersen, Kołodziej
11. (57,96) Jonsson, Sayfutdinov, Gollob, Łaguta
12. (57,74) Jonasson, Hampel, Harris, Holder
13. (57,71) Sayfutdinov, Harris, Lindgren, Kołodziej
14. (57,60) Jonasson, Lindbäck, Gollob, Pedersen
15. (58,65) Crump, Jonsson, Hampel, Holta
16. (57,79) Bjerre, Holder, Hancock, Łaguta
17. (57,59) Hancock, Hampel, Lindgren, Gollob (R)
18. (58,52) Harris, Pedersen, Łaguta, Holta
19. (58,82) Jonsson, Jonasson, Bjerre (X), Kołodziej (Fx)
20. (58,48) Crump, Lindbäck, Holder, Sayfutdinov (X)
  Semi-Finals:
21. (56,93) Sayfutdinov, Hampel, Crump, Jonasson
22. (58,36) Bjerre, Jonsson, Hancock, Harris
  the Final:
23. (57,00) Hampel (6 points), Jonsson (4), Bjerre (2), Sayfutdinov (0)

== The intermediate classification ==
Qualifies for next season's Grand Prix series
Full-time Grand Prix rider
Wild card, track reserve or qualified reserve

Pos.	Rider	Points	EUR (Poland)	SWE (Sweden)	CZE (Czech Republic)	DEN (Denmark)	GBR (United Kingdom)	ITA (Italy)	SCA (Sweden)	POL (Poland)	NOR (Denmark)	CRO (Croatia)	PL2 (Poland)
1	(United States) (5) Greg Hancock	104	14	10	23	13	20	15	9				
2	(Poland) (2) Jarosław Hampel	82	12	5	19	12	5	12	17				
3	(Poland) (1) Tomasz Gollob	76	18	6	17	20	7	5	3				
4	(Australia) (3) Jason Crump	72	5	6	13	18	8	6	16				
5	(Sweden) (9) Andreas Jonsson	72	5	6	8	7	10	17	19				
6	(Russia) (12) Emil Sayfutdinov	72	14	8	6	7	13	11	13				
7	(Australia) (8) Chris Holder	70	9	10	9	14	15	6	7				
8	(Denmark) (7) Kenneth Bjerre	66	10	2	9	6	11	12	16				
9	(Denmark) (10) Nicki Pedersen	59	17	4	9	7	16	3	3				
10	(Sweden) (11) Fredrik Lindgren	55	11	6	9	9	5	7	8				
11	(Sweden) (14) Antonio Lindbäck	48	1	9	6	5	3	17	7				
12	(United Kingdom) (6) Chris Harris	43	7	4	3	7	6	6	10				
13	(Poland) (15) Janusz Kołodziej	39	8	9	1	3	7	10	1				
14	(Poland) (4) Rune Holta	33	9	1	7	6	1	5	4				
15	(Sweden) (16) Thomas H. Jonasson	17	–	8	–	–	–	–	9				
16	(Sweden) (19) Magnus Zetterström	12	–	–	–	–	9	3	–				
17	(Russia) (13) Artem Laguta	11	0	1	2	7	–	–	1				
18	(Slovenia) (16) Matej Žagar	9	–	–	–	–	–	9	–				
19	(United Kingdom) (16) Scott Nicholls	5	–	–	–	–	5	–	–				
20	(Poland) (16) Damian Baliński	4	4	–	–	–	–	–	–				
21	(Czech Republic) (16) Matěj Kůs	3	–	–	3	–	–	–	–				
22	(Denmark) (16) Mikkel B. Jensen	2	–	–	–	2	–	–	–				
23	(United Kingdom) (17) Tai Woffinden	2	–	–	–	–	2	–	–				
24	(Sweden) (17) Simon Gustafsson	1	–	1	–	–	–	–	ns				
25	(Sweden) (18) Dennis Andersson	0	–	0	–	–	–	–	–				
Rider(s) not classified
	(Poland) (17) Patryk Dudek	—	ns	–	–	–	–	–	–				
	(Poland) (18) Maciej Janowski	—	ns	–	–	–	–	–	–				
	(Czech Republic) (17) Lukáš Dryml	—	–	–	ns	–	–	–	–				
	(Czech Republic) (18) Zdeněk Simota	—	–	–	ns	–	–	–	–				
	(Denmark) (17) Michael Jepsen Jensen	—	–	–	–	ns	–	–	–				
	(Denmark) (18) Kenneth Arendt Larsen	—	–	–	–	ns	–	–	–				
	(United Kingdom) (18) Ben Barker	—	–	–	–	–	ns	–	–				
	(Italy) (17) Mattia Carpanese	—	–	–	–	–	–	ns	–				
	(Italy) (18) Guglielmo Franchetti	—	–	–	–	–	–	ns	–				
	(Sweden) (18) Linus Sundström	—	–	–	–	–	–	–	ns				
Pos.	Rider	Points	EUR (Poland)	SWE (Sweden)	CZE (Czech Republic)	DEN (Denmark)	GBR (United Kingdom)	ITA (Italy)	SCA (Sweden)	POL (Poland)	NOR (Denmark)	CRO (Croatia)	PL2 (Poland)

== See also ==
- motorcycle speedway
