= 2011 Speedway Grand Prix of Poland =

- FIM Torun Speedway Grand Prix of Poland

Information
- Date: 27 August 2011
- City: (Poland) Toruń
- Event: 8 of 11 (141)
- Referee: (Sweden) Krister Gardell
- Jury President: (Italy) Armando Castagna

Stadium details
- Stadium: MotoArena Toruń
- Length: 325 m (355 yd)

SGP Results
- Attendance: 17,000
- Best Time: (United States) Greg Hancock; 60,75 secs (in Heat 20)
- (gold) Winner: (Sweden) Andreas Jonsson
- (silver) Runner-up: (Poland) Jarosław Hampel
- (bronze) 3rd place: (Australia) Darcy Ward

The 2011 Enea Toruń FIM Speedway Grand Prix of Poland was the eighth race of the 2011 Speedway Grand Prix season. It took place on April 27 at the MotoArena Toruń stadium in Toruń, Poland.

== Riders ==
The Speedway Grand Prix Commission nominated Darcy Ward as Wild Card, and Piotr Pawlicki, Jr. and Emil Pulczyński both as Track Reserves. Originally, Polish Motor Union has proposed Adrian Miedziński of Unibax Toruń as a Wild Card. Ward, 2009 and 2010 Under-21 World Champion, raced for Unibax Toruń between 2009 and 2010. Injury Pole Janusz Kołodziej was replaced by first Qualified Substitutes, Magnus Zetterström. The Draw was made on August 26 at 13:00 CEST.

(13) (Poland) Janusz Kołodziej → (19) (Sweden) Magnus Zetterström

== Results ==
Grand Prix was won by Andreas Jonsson who beat Jarosław Hampel, wild card Darcy Ward and Antonio Lindbäck in the final.

=== Heat details ===
Placing	Draw	Rider	Total	1	2	3	4	5	6	7	8	9	10	11	12	13	14	15	16	17	18	19	20	Pts	Pos	21	22	23
1	16	(Sweden) (9) Andreas Jonsson	20				2				3	3						1			3			12	1	2		3
2	14	(Poland) (2) Jarosław Hampel	18				3		3					3		2							0	11	3		3	2
3	7	(Australia) (16) Darcy Ward	15		1					1					3	3					2			10	6	3		1
4	11	(Sweden) (14) Antonio Lindbäck	12			0				3		2					3						2	10	5		2	0
5	4	(United States) (5) Greg Hancock	13	3							2				2				2				3	12	2		1
6	10	(Poland) (1) Tomasz Gollob	12			3			2						1			3		2				11	4	1
7	12	(Poland) (4) Rune Holta	8			2					1		2			1						2		8	7	0
8	5	(Sweden) (19) Magnus Zetterström	7		3			3					0					0					1	7	8		0
9	2	(Australia) (8) Chris Holder	7	2					0				3				2				0			7	9
10	9	(Australia) (3) Jason Crump	7			1		2						0					3		1			7	10
11	3	(Russia) (12) Emil Sayfutdinov	7	1						2				1				2				1		7	11
12	6	(Denmark) (10) Nicki Pedersen	6		0				1			1							1			3		6	12
13	8	(Denmark) (7) Kenneth Bjerre	6		2						0			2			1			1				6	13
14	15	(Sweden) (11) Fredrik Lindgren	5				1			0			1						0	3				5	14
15	1	(Russia) (13) Artem Laguta	1	0				1				0				0				X				1	15
16	13	(United Kingdom) (6) Chris Harris	0				0	0							0		0					0		0	16
17	17	(Poland) (17) Piotr Pawlicki, Jr.	-																					-	17
18	18	(Poland) (18) Emil Pulczyński	-																					-	18
Placing	Draw	Rider	Total	1	2	3	4	5	6	7	8	9	10	11	12	13	14	15	16	17	18	19	20	Pts	Pos	21	22	23

e: retired or mechanical failure • m: exclusion for exceeding two minute time allowance • t: exclusion for touching the tapes • x: other exclusion • f: fell
ns: non-starter • nc: non-classify
Semi-finals: Heat 21: Riders placed 1st, 4th, 6th & 7th in the intermediate classification (after 20 heats)
Heat 22: Riders placed 2nd, 3rd, 5th & 8th in the intermediate classification (after 20 heats)
Big Final (heat 23): The first and second placed riders in each of the Semi-Finals

gate A – inside	gate B	gate C	gate D – outside

=== Heat after heat ===
1. (6) Hancock, Holder, Sajfutdinow, Łaguta
2. (6) Zetterström, Bjerre, Ward, Pedersen
3. (6) Gollob, Holta, Crump, Lindbäck
4. (6) Hampel, Jonsson, Lindgren, Harris
5. (6) Zetterström, Crump, Łaguta, Harris
6. (6) Hampel, Gollob, Pedersen, Holder
7. (6) Lindbäck, Sajfutdinow, Ward, Lindgren
8. (6) Jonsson, Hancock, Holta, Bjerre
9. (6) Jonsson, Lindbäck, Pedersen, Łaguta
10. (6) Holder, Holta, Lindgren, Zetterström
11. (6) Hampel, Bjerre, Sajfutdinow, Crump
12. (6) Ward, Hancock, Gollob, Harris
13. (6) Ward, Hampel, Holta, Łaguta
14. (6) Lindbäck, Holder, Bjerre, Harris
15. (6) Gollob, Sajfutdinow, Jonsson, Zetterström
16. (6) Crump, Hancock, Pedersen, Lindgren
17. (6) Lindgren, Gollob, Bjerre, Łaguta (X)
18. (6) Jonsson, Ward, Crump, Holder
19. (6) Pedersen, Holta, Sajfutdinow, Harris
20. (6) Hancock, Lindbäck, Zetterström, Hampel
  Semi-finals:
21. (6) Ward, Jonsson, Gollob, Holta
22. (6) Hampel, Lindbäck, Hancock, Zetterström
  the Final:
23. (6) Jonsson (6 points), Hampel (4), Ward (2), Lindbäck (0)

== The intermediate classification ==
Qualifies for next season's Grand Prix series
Full-time Grand Prix rider
Wild card, track reserve or qualified reserve

Pos.	Rider	Points	EUR (Poland)	SWE (Sweden)	CZE (Czech Republic)	DEN (Denmark)	GBR (United Kingdom)	ITA (Italy)	SCA (Sweden)	POL (Poland)	NOR (Denmark)	CRO (Croatia)	PL2 (Poland)
1	(United States) (5) Greg Hancock	117	14	10	23	13	20	15	9	13			
2	(Poland) (2) Jarosław Hampel	100	12	5	19	12	5	12	17	18			
3	(Sweden) (9) Andreas Jonsson	92	5	6	8	7	10	17	19	20			
4	(Poland) (1) Tomasz Gollob	88	18	6	17	20	7	5	3	12			
5	(Australia) (3) Jason Crump	79	5	6	13	18	8	6	16	7			
6	(Russia) (12) Emil Sayfutdinov	79	14	8	6	7	13	11	13	7			
7	(Australia) (8) Chris Holder	77	9	10	9	14	15	6	7	7			
8	(Denmark) (7) Kenneth Bjerre	72	10	2	9	6	11	12	16	6			
9	(Denmark) (10) Nicki Pedersen	65	17	4	9	7	16	3	3	6			
10	(Sweden) (11) Fredrik Lindgren	60	11	6	9	9	5	7	8	5			
11	(Sweden) (14) Antonio Lindbäck	60	1	9	6	5	3	17	7	12			
12	(United Kingdom) (6) Chris Harris	43	7	4	3	7	6	6	10	0			
13	(Poland) (4) Rune Holta	41	9	1	7	6	1	5	4	8			
14	(Poland) (15) Janusz Kołodziej	39	8	9	1	3	7	10	1	–			
15	(Sweden) (19) Magnus Zetterström	19	–	–	–	–	9	3	–	7			
16	(Sweden) (16) Thomas H. Jonasson	17	–	8	–	–	–	–	9	–			
17	(Australia) (16) Darcy Ward	15	–	–	–	–	–	–	–	15			
18	(Russia) (13) Artem Laguta	12	0	1	2	7	–	–	1	1			
19	(Slovenia) (16) Matej Žagar	9	–	–	–	–	–	9	–	–			
20	(United Kingdom) (16) Scott Nicholls	5	–	–	–	–	5	–	–	–			
21	(Poland) (16) Damian Baliński	4	4	–	–	–	–	–	–	–			
22	(Czech Republic) (16) Matěj Kůs	3	–	–	3	–	–	–	–	–			
23	(Denmark) (16) Mikkel B. Jensen	2	–	–	–	2	–	–	–	–			
24	(United Kingdom) (17) Tai Woffinden	2	–	–	–	–	2	–	–	–			
25	(Sweden) (17) Simon Gustafsson	1	–	1	–	–	–	–	ns	–			
26	(Sweden) (18) Dennis Andersson	0	–	0	–	–	–	–	–	–			
Rider(s) not classified
	(Poland) (17) Patryk Dudek	—	ns	–	–	–	–	–	–	–			
	(Poland) (18) Maciej Janowski	—	ns	–	–	–	–	–	–	–			
	(Czech Republic) (17) Lukáš Dryml	—	–	–	ns	–	–	–	–	–			
	(Czech Republic) (18) Zdeněk Simota	—	–	–	ns	–	–	–	–	–			
	(Denmark) (17) Michael Jepsen Jensen	—	–	–	–	ns	–	–	–	–			
	(Denmark) (18) Kenneth Arendt Larsen	—	–	–	–	ns	–	–	–	–			
	(United Kingdom) (18) Ben Barker	—	–	–	–	–	ns	–	–	–			
	(Italy) (17) Mattia Carpanese	—	–	–	–	–	–	ns	–	–			
	(Italy) (18) Guglielmo Franchetti	—	–	–	–	–	–	ns	–	–			
	(Sweden) (18) Linus Sundström	—	–	–	–	–	–	–	ns	–			
	(Poland) (17) Piotr Pawlicki, Jr.	—	–	–	–	–	–	–	–	ns			
	(Poland) (18) Emil Pulczyński	—	–	–	–	–	–	–	–	ns			
Pos.	Rider	Points	EUR (Poland)	SWE (Sweden)	CZE (Czech Republic)	DEN (Denmark)	GBR (United Kingdom)	ITA (Italy)	SCA (Sweden)	POL (Poland)	NOR (Denmark)	CRO (Croatia)	PL2 (Poland)

== See also ==
- motorcycle speedway
