= 2011 Speedway Grand Prix of Poland II =

- FIM Gorzow Speedway Grand Prix of Poland

Information
- Date: 8 October 2011
- City: (Poland) Gorzów Wielkopolski
- Event: 11 of 11 (144)
- Referee: (Sweden) Krister Gardell

Stadium details
- Stadium: Edward Jancarz Stadium

SGP Results
- Attendance: 17,000
- Best Time: (Sweden) Andreas Jonsson; 60,98 secs (in Heat 5)
- (gold) Winner: (United States) Greg Hancock
- (silver) Runner-up: (Denmark) Nicki Pedersen
- (bronze) 3rd place: (Russia) Emil Sayfutdinov

The FIM Gorzow Speedway Grand Prix of Poland was the eleventh and final race of the 2011 Speedway Grand Prix season. It took place on October 8 at the Edward Jancarz Stadium in Gorzów Wielkopolski, Poland.

== Riders ==
The Speedway Grand Prix Commission nominated Darcy Ward as Wild Card, and Bartosz Zmarzlik and Kamil Pulczyński both as Track Reserves. The Draw was made on October 7.

== Results ==
It was second Grand Prix event (last time 2011 Swedish SGP) which was stopped before holding all heats (after Heat 16). According to "FIM Speedway World Championship Grand Prix Regulations (2011 edition)", points scored before Heat 16 is approved as an event result.

If a Grand Prix meeting is interrupted or suspended for any reason whatsoever,

the following rules will apply:

1. (...)
2. If the meeting is interrupted before heat 20 is accomplished and the remaining heats cannot be completed, then the race points scored at the completion of heat 16 will determine the result.
3. (...)
— Speedway Grand Prix Regulation, Rule 077.1.4.1, FIM (page 7 and 8)

Grand Prix was won by Greg Hancock who beat Nicki Pedersen, Emil Sayfutdinov and Tomasz Gollob.

=== Heat details ===
Placing	Draw	Rider	Total	1	2	3	4	5	6	7	8	9	10	11	12	13	14	15	16	17	18	19	20	Pts	Pos	21	22	23
1	8	(United States) (5) Greg Hancock	11		3						3			2			3							11	1
2	1	(Denmark) (10) Nicki Pedersen	10	3				2				3				2								10	2
3	15	(Russia) (12) Emil Sayfutdinov	8				0			2			3						3					8	3
4	10	(Poland) (1) Tomasz Gollob	8			1			2						3			2						8	4
5	12	(Australia) (16) Darcy Ward	7			3					1		0			3								7	5
6	3	(United Kingdom) (6) Chris Harris	7	1						3				3				X						7	6
7	9	(Sweden) (9) Andreas Jonsson	7			2		3						0					2					7	7
8	5	(Australia) (8) Chris Holder	6		2			0					1					3						6	8
9	16	(Poland) (2) Jarosław Hampel	6				3				2	0						1						6	9
10	14	(Australia) (3) Jason Crump	6				1		3					1		1								6	10
11	11	(Sweden) (11) Fredrik Lindgren	5			0				1		2					2							5	11
12	2	(Poland) (15) Janusz Kołodziej	5	2					0				2				1							5	12
13	13	(Denmark) (7) Kenneth Bjerre	4				2	1							1		0							4	13
14	7	(Russia) (13) Artem Laguta	3		1					0					2	0								3	14
15	6	(Sweden) (14) Antonio Lindbäck	3		0				1			1							1					3	15
16	4	(Poland) (4) Rune Holta	0	X							0				X				0					0	16
17	17	(Poland) (17) Bartosz Zmarzlik	-																					-	17
18	18	(Poland) (18) Kamil Pulczyński	-																					-	18
Placing	Draw	Rider	Total	1	2	3	4	5	6	7	8	9	10	11	12	13	14	15	16	17	18	19	20	Pts	Pos	21	22	23

e: retired or mechanical failure • m: exclusion for exceeding two minute time allowance • t: exclusion for touching the tapes • x: other exclusion • f: fell
ns: non-starter • nc: non-classify
Semi-finals: Heat 21: Riders placed 1st, 4th, 6th & 7th in the intermediate classification (after 20 heats)
Heat 22: Riders placed 2nd, 3rd, 5th & 8th in the intermediate classification (after 20 heats)
Big Final (heat 23): The first and second placed riders in each of the Semi-Finals

gate A – inside	gate B	gate C	gate D – outside

=== Heat after heat ===
1. (63,78) Pedersen, Kołodziej, Harris, Holta (X)
2. (62,70) Hancock, Holder, Łaguta, Lindbäck
3. (63,30) Ward, Jonsson, Gollob, Lindgren
4. (62,06) Hampel, Bjerre, Crump, Sayfutdinov
5. (60,98) Jonsson, Pedersen, Bjerre, Holder
6. (63,50) Crump, Gollob, Lindbäck, Kołodziej
7. (63,91) Harris, Sayfutdinov, Lindgren, Łaguta
8. (63,38) Hancock, Hampel, Ward, Holta
9. (63,59) Pedersen, Lindgren, Lindbäck, Hampel
10. (63,34) Sayfutdinov, Kołodziej, Holder, Ward
11. (64,19) Harris, Hancock, Crump, Jonsson
12. (64,43) Gollob, Łaguta, Bjerre, Holta (X)
13. (64,25) Ward, Pedersen, Crump, Łaguta
14. (63,81) Hancock, Lindgren, Kołodziej, Bjerre
15. (65,81) Holder, Gollob, Hampel, Harris (X)
16. (67,44) Sayfutdinov, Jonsson, Lindbäck, Holta

== The intermediate classification ==
Qualifies for next season's Grand Prix series
Full-time Grand Prix rider
Wild card, track reserve or qualified reserve

Pos.	Rider	Points	EUR (Poland)	SWE (Sweden)	CZE (Czech Republic)	DEN (Denmark)	GBR (United Kingdom)	ITA (Italy)	SCA (Sweden)	POL (Poland)	NOR (Denmark)	CRO (Croatia)	PL2 (Poland)
Gold	(United States) (5) Greg Hancock	165	14	10	23	13	20	15	9	13	22	15	11
Silver	(Sweden) (9) Andreas Jonsson	125	5	6	8	7	10	17	19	20	8	18	7
Bronze	(Poland) (2) Jarosław Hampel	123	12	5	19	12	5	12	17	18	8	9	6
4	(Australia) (3) Jason Crump	110	5	6	13	18	8	6	16	7	17	8	6
5	(Poland) (1) Tomasz Gollob	106	18	6	17	20	7	5	3	12	5	5	8
6	(Russia) (12) Emil Sayfutdinov	106	14	8	6	7	13	11	13	7	9	10	8
7	(Denmark) (7) Kenneth Bjerre	101	10	2	9	6	11	12	16	6	13	12	4
8	(Australia) (8) Chris Holder	101	9	10	9	14	15	6	7	7	11	7	6
9	(Sweden) (11) Fredrik Lindgren	90	11	6	9	9	5	7	8	5	13	12	5
10	(Denmark) (10) Nicki Pedersen	89	17	4	9	7	16	3	3	6	10	4	10
11	(United Kingdom) (6) Chris Harris	74	7	4	3	7	6	6	10	0	5	19	7
12	(Sweden) (14) Antonio Lindbäck	72	1	9	6	5	3	17	7	12	6	3	3
13	(Poland) (4) Rune Holta	53	9	1	7	6	1	5	4	8	3	9	0
14	(Poland) (15) Janusz Kołodziej	50	8	9	1	3	7	10	1	–	2	4	5
15	(Russia) (13) Artem Laguta	28	0	1	2	7	–	–	1	1	9	4	3
16	(Australia) (16) Darcy Ward	22	–	–	–	–	–	–	–	15	–	–	7
17	(Sweden) (19) Magnus Zetterström	19	–	–	–	–	9	3	–	7	–	–	–
18	(Sweden) (16) Thomas H. Jonasson	17	–	8	–	–	–	–	9	–	–	–	–
19	(Slovenia) (16) Matej Žagar	14	–	–	–	–	–	9	–	–	–	5	–
20	(United Kingdom) (16) Scott Nicholls	5	–	–	–	–	5	–	–	–	–	–	–
21	(Poland) (16) Damian Baliński	4	4	–	–	–	–	–	–	–	–	–	–
22	(Czech Republic) (16) Matěj Kůs	3	–	–	3	–	–	–	–	–	–	–	–
23	(Denmark) (16) Bjarne Pedersen	3	–	–	–	–	–	–	–	–	3	–	–
24	(Denmark) (16) Mikkel B. Jensen	2	–	–	–	2	–	–	–	–	–	–	–
25	(United Kingdom) (17) Tai Woffinden	2	–	–	–	–	2	–	–	–	–	–	–
26	(Sweden) (17) Simon Gustafsson	1	–	1	–	–	–	–	ns	–	–	–	–
27	(Sweden) (18) Dennis Andersson	0	–	0	–	–	–	–	–	–	–	–	–
Rider(s) not classified
	(Poland) (17) Patryk Dudek	—	ns	–	–	–	–	–	–	–	–	–	–
	(Poland) (18) Maciej Janowski	—	ns	–	–	–	–	–	–	–	–	–	–
	(Czech Republic) (17) Lukáš Dryml	—	–	–	ns	–	–	–	–	–	–	–	–
	(Czech Republic) (18) Zdeněk Simota	—	–	–	ns	–	–	–	–	–	–	–	–
	(Denmark) (17) Michael Jepsen Jensen	—	–	–	–	ns	–	–	–	–	–	–	–
	(Denmark) (18) Kenneth Arendt Larsen	—	–	–	–	ns	–	–	–	–	–	–	–
	(United Kingdom) (18) Ben Barker	—	–	–	–	–	ns	–	–	–	–	–	–
	(Italy) (17) Mattia Carpanese	—	–	–	–	–	–	ns	–	–	–	–	–
	(Italy) (18) Guglielmo Franchetti	—	–	–	–	–	–	ns	–	–	–	–	–
	(Sweden) (18) Linus Sundström	—	–	–	–	–	–	–	ns	–	–	–	–
	(Poland) (17) Piotr Pawlicki, Jr.	—	–	–	–	–	–	–	–	ns	–	–	–
	(Poland) (18) Emil Pulczyński	—	–	–	–	–	–	–	–	ns	–	–	–
	(Denmark) (17) Michael Jepsen Jensen	—	–	–	–	–	–	–	–	–	ns	–	–
	(Denmark) (18) Mikkel Michelsen	—	–	–	–	–	–	–	–	–	ns	–	–
	(Croatia) (17) Dino Kovačić	—	–	–	–	–	–	–	–	–	–	ns	–
	(Slovenia) (18) Matija Duh	—	–	–	–	–	–	–	–	–	–	ns	–
	(Poland) (17) Bartosz Zmarzlik	—	–	–	–	–	–	–	–	–	–	–	ns
	(Poland) (18) Kamil Pulczyński	—	–	–	–	–	–	–	–	–	–	–	ns
Pos.	Rider	Points	EUR (Poland)	SWE (Sweden)	CZE (Czech Republic)	DEN (Denmark)	GBR (United Kingdom)	ITA (Italy)	SCA (Sweden)	POL (Poland)	NOR (Denmark)	CRO (Croatia)	PL2 (Poland)

== See also ==
- motorcycle speedway
