= 2011 Speedway Grand Prix of Sweden =

- 2011 FIM Meridian Lifts Swedish Speedway Grand Prix

Information
- Date: 14 May 2011
- City: (Sweden) Gothenburg
- Event: 2 of 11 (135)
- Referee: (Poland) Wojciech Grodzki
- Jury President: (Denmark) Jörgen L Jensen

Stadium details
- Stadium: Ullevi
- Length: 400 m (440 yd)

SGP Results
- Attendance: 13,304
- Best Time: (Sweden) Antonio Lindbäck; 71,4 secs (in Heat 2)
- (gold) Winner: (Australia) Chris Holder
- (silver) Runner-up: (United States) Greg Hancock
- (bronze) 3rd place: (Sweden) Antonio Lindbäck

The 2011 FIM Meridian Lifts Swedish Speedway Grand Prix was the second race of the 2011 Speedway Grand Prix season. It took place on 14 May at the Ullevi stadium in Gothenburg, Sweden.

== Riders ==
The Speedway Grand Prix Commission nominated Thomas H. Jonasson as Wild Card, and Simon Gustafsson and Dennis Andersson both as Track Reserves. The Draw was made on 13 May by stadium manager.

== Results ==
It was first Grand Prix event which was stopped before holding all heats (after Heat 16). According to "FIM Speedway World Championship Grand Prix Regulations (2011 edition)", points scored before Heat 16 are approved as event results.

If a Grand Prix meeting is interrupted or suspended for any reason whatsoever,

the following rules will apply:

1. (...)
2. If the meeting is interrupted before heat 20 is accomplished and the remaining heats cannot be completed, then the race points scored at the completion of heat 16 will determine the result.
3. (...)
— Speedway Grand Prix Regulation, Rule 077.1.4.1, FIM (page 7 and 8)

Grand Prix was won by Chris Holder (10 points), who beat Greg Hancock (10), Antonio Lindbäck (9) and Janusz Kołodziej (9). Hancock and the defending World Champion Tomasz Gollob becoming Championship co-leader.

=== Heat details ===
Placing	Draw	Rider	Total	1	2	3	4	5	6	7	8	9	10	11	12	13	14	15	16	17	18	19	20	Pts	Pos	21	22	23
1	14	(Australia) (8) Chris Holder	10				2		3					3		2								10	1
2	9	(United States) (5) Greg Hancock	10			3		2						2					3					10	2
3	4	(Sweden) (14) Antonio Lindbäck	9	3							3				3				F					9	3
4	6	(Poland) (15) Janusz Kołodziej	9		2				2			3							2					9	4
5	2	(Russia) (12) Emil Sayfutdinov	8	1					1				3				3							8	5
6	11	(Sweden) (16) Thomas H. Jonasson	8			1				3		2					2							8	6
7	5	(Australia) (3) Jason Crump	6		3			3					F					-						6	7
8	3	(Sweden) (9) Andreas Jonsson	6	0						2				1				3						6	8
9	7	(Poland) (1) Tomasz Gollob	6		1					0					2	3								6	9
10	13	(Sweden) (11) Fredrik Lindgren	6				3	1							1		1							6	10
11	15	(Poland) (2) Jarosław Hampel	5				1			1			2						1					5	11
12	10	(Denmark) (10) Nicki Pedersen	4			2			0						R			2						4	12
13	16	(United Kingdom) (6) Chris Harris	4				0				2	1						1						4	13
14	1	(Denmark) (7) Kenneth Bjerre	2	2				F				0				M/-								2	14
15	8	(Poland) (4) Rune Holta	1		0						1			0			0							1	15
16	12	(Russia) (13) Artem Laguta	1			X					0		1			0								1	16
17	17	(Sweden) (17) Simon Gustafsson	1													1								1	17
18	18	(Sweden) (18) Dennis Andersson	0															0						0	18
Placing	Draw	Rider	Total	1	2	3	4	5	6	7	8	9	10	11	12	13	14	15	16	17	18	19	20	Pts	Pos	21	22	23

e: retired or mechanical failure • m: exclusion for exceeding two minute time allowance • t: exclusion for touching the tapes • x: other exclusion • f: fell
ns: non-starter • nc: non-classify
Semi-finals: Heat 21: Riders placed 1st, 4th, 6th & 7th in the intermediate classification (after 20 heats)
Heat 22: Riders placed 2nd, 3rd, 5th & 8th in the intermediate classification (after 20 heats)
Big Final (heat 23): The first and second placed riders in each of the Semi-Finals

gate A – inside	gate B	gate C	gate D – outside

=== Heat after heat ===
1. (71,4) Lindbäck, Bjerre, Sajfutdinow, Jonsson
2. (72,0) Crump, Kołodziej, Gollob, Holta
3. (71,5) Hancock, Pedersen, Jonasson, Laguta (X/2x)
4. (72,7) Lindgren, Holder, Hampel, Harris
5. (71,9) Crump, Hancock, Lindgren, Bjerre (F4)
6. (72,4) Holder, Kołodziej, Sajfutdinow, Pedersen
7. (73,0) Jonasson, Jonsson, Hampel, Gollob
8. (72,2) Lindbäck, Harris, Holta, Laguta
9. (74,0) Kołodziej, Jonasson, Harris, Bjerre
10. (72,4) Sajfutdinow, Hampel, Laguta, Crump (Fx)
11. (72,5) Holder, Hancock, Jonsson, Holta
12. (72,7) Lindbäck, Gollob, Lindgren, Pedersen (R4)
13. (73,7) Gollob, Holder, Gustafsson, Laguta (Bjerre - M)
14. (73,9) Sajfutdinow, Jonasson, Lindgren, Holta
15. (74,7) Jonsson, Pedersen, Harris, Andersson (Crump - ns)
16. (74,5) Hancock, Kołodziej, Hampel, Lindbäck (F3)

== The intermediate classification ==
Qualifies for next season's Grand Prix series
Full-time Grand Prix rider
Wild card, track reserve or qualified reserve

Pos.	Rider	Points	EUR (Poland)	SWE (Sweden)	CZE (Czech Republic)	DEN (Denmark)	GBR (United Kingdom)	ITA (Italy)	SCA (Sweden)	POL (Poland)	NOR (Denmark)	CRO (Croatia)	PL2 (Poland)
1	(Poland) (1) Tomasz Gollob	24	18	6									
2	(United States) (5) Greg Hancock	24	14	10									
3	(Russia) (12) Emil Sayfutdinov	22	14	8									
4	(Denmark) (10) Nicki Pedersen	21	17	4									
5	(Australia) (8) Chris Holder	19	9	10									
6	(Poland) (2) Jarosław Hampel	17	12	5									
7	(Sweden) (11) Fredrik Lindgren	17	11	6									
8	(Poland) (15) Janusz Kołodziej	17	8	9									
9	(Denmark) (7) Kenneth Bjerre	12	10	2									
10	(Australia) (3) Jason Crump	11	5	6									
11	(United Kingdom) (6) Chris Harris	11	7	4									
12	(Sweden) (9) Andreas Jonsson	11	5	6									
13	(Poland) (4) Rune Holta	10	9	1									
14	(Sweden) (14) Antonio Lindbäck	10	1	9									
15	(Sweden) (16) Thomas H. Jonasson	8	–	8									
14	(Poland) (16) Damian Baliński	4	4	–									
16	(Russia) (13) Artem Laguta	1	0	1									
17	(Sweden) (17) Simon Gustafsson	1	–	1									
18	(Sweden) (18) Dennis Andersson	0	–	0									
Rider(s) not classified
	(Poland) (17) Patryk Dudek	—	ns	–									
	(Poland) (18) Maciej Janowski	—	ns	–									
Pos.	Rider	Points	EUR (Poland)	SWE (Sweden)	CZE (Czech Republic)	DEN (Denmark)	GBR (United Kingdom)	ITA (Italy)	SCA (Sweden)	POL (Poland)	NOR (Denmark)	CRO (Croatia)	PL2 (Poland)

== See also ==
- motorcycle speedway
