= 2011 Speedway Grand Prix of Croatia =

- FIM Nice Croatian Speedway Grand Prix

Information
- Date: 24 September 2011
- City: (Croatia) Donji Kraljevec (Goričan)
- Event: 10 of 11 (143)
- Referee: (United Kingdom) Craig Ackroyd
- Jury President: (Finland) Ikka Teromaa

Stadium details
- Stadium: Stadium Milenium
- Length: 305 m (334 yd)

SGP Results
- Attendance: 6,000
- Best Time: (Denmark) Kenneth Bjerre; 59,84 secs (in Heat 8)
- (gold) Winner: (Sweden) Andreas Jonsson
- (silver) Runner-up: (United Kingdom) Chris Harris
- (bronze) 3rd place: (Sweden) Fredrik Lindgren

The 2011 FIM Nice Croatian Speedway World Championship Grand Prix was the tenth race of the 2011 Speedway Grand Prix season. It took place on September 24 at the Stadium Milenium in Donji Kraljevec, Croatia.

== Riders ==
The Speedway Grand Prix Commission nominated Matej Žagar as Wild Card, and Dino Kovačić and Matija Duh both as Track Reserves. The Draw was made on September 23.

== Results ==
Grand Prix was won by Andreas Jonsson who beat Chris Harris, Fredrik Lindgren and Greg Hancock in the final.

After the event, championship leader Greg Hancock has more than 24 points over second Andreas Jonsson and becoming 2011 World Champion. Hancock is the oldest World Champion in history, beating Ivan Mauger. Between first and last champion title was 14 years; former the longest period was 11 years (Mauger 1968–1979).

=== Heat details ===
| Placing | Draw | Rider | Total | 1 | 2 | 3 | 4 | 5 | 6 | 7 | 8 | 9 | 10 | 11 | 12 | 13 | 14 | 15 | 16 | 17 | 18 | 19 | 20 | Pts | Pos | 21 | 22 | 23 |
|---|---|---|---|---|---|---|---|---|---|---|---|---|---|---|---|---|---|---|---|---|---|---|---|---|---|---|---|---|
| 1 | 1 | (Sweden) (9) Andreas Jonsson | 18 | 3 | | | | 1 | | | | F | | | | 3 | | | | 2 | | | | 9 | 6 | 3 | | 3 |
| 2 | 13 | (United Kingdom) (6) Chris Harris | 19 | | | | 3 | 3 | | | | | | | 3 | | 2 | | | | | 2 | | 13 | 1 | 2 | | 2 |
| 3 | 14 | (Sweden) (11) Fredrik Lindgren | 12 | | | | 2 | | 1 | | | | | 3 | | 2 | | | | | | | 0 | 8 | 8 | | 2 | 1 |
| 4 | 11 | (United States) (5) Greg Hancock | 15 | | | 3 | | | | 2 | | 3 | | | | | 3 | | | | | | 1 | 12 | 2 | | 3 | 0 |
| 5 | 8 | (Denmark) (7) Kenneth Bjerre | 12 | | 2 | | | | | | 3 | | | 2 | | | 1 | | | 3 | | | | 11 | 3 | | 1 |
| 6 | 6 | (Russia) (12) Emil Sayfutdinov | 10 | | 3 | | | | 3 | | | 1 | | | | | | | 3 | | | 0 | | 10 | 4 | 0 |
| 7 | 5 | (Poland) (2) Jarosław Hampel | 9 | | 1 | | | 0 | | | | | 3 | | | | | 3 | | | | | 2 | 9 | 5 | | 0 |
| 8 | 4 | (Poland) (4) Rune Holta | 9 | 0 | | | | | | | 2 | | | | 1 | | | | 2 | | | | 3 | 8 | 7 | 1 |
| 9 | 16 | (Australia) (3) Jason Crump | 8 | | | | 1 | | | | 0 | 2 | | | | | | 2 | | | 3 | | | 8 | 9 |
| 10 | 9 | (Australia) (8) Chris Holder | 7 | | | 1 | | 2 | | | | | | 1 | | | | | 1 | | 2 | | | 7 | 10 |
| 11 | 15 | (Poland) (1) Tomasz Gollob | 5 | | | | 0 | | | 3 | | | 1 | | | | | | 0 | 1 | | | | 5 | 11 |
| 12 | 7 | (Slovenia) (16) Matej Žagar | 5 | | 0 | | | | | 1 | | | | | 2 | 1 | | | | | 1 | | | 5 | 12 |
| 13 | 12 | (Poland) (15) Janusz Kołodziej | 4 | | | 0 | | | | | 1 | | 0 | | | 0 | | | | | | 3 | | 4 | 13 |
| 14 | 10 | (Russia) (13) Artem Laguta | 4 | | | 2 | | | 2 | | | | | | 0 | | | 0 | | 0 | | | | 4 | 14 |
| 15 | 2 | (Denmark) (10) Nicki Pedersen | 4 | 2 | | | | | Fx | | | | 2 | | | | 0 | | | | 0 | | | 4 | 15 |
| 16 | 3 | (Sweden) (14) Antonio Lindbäck | 3 | 1 | | | | | | 0 | | | | 0 | | | | 1 | | | | 1 | | 3 | 16 |
| 17 | 17 | (Croatia) (17) Dino Kovačić | - | | | | | | | | | | | | | | | | | | | | | - | 17 |
| 18 | 18 | (Slovenia) (18) Matija Duh | - | | | | | | | | | | | | | | | | | | | | | - | 18 |
| Placing | Draw | Rider | Total | 1 | 2 | 3 | 4 | 5 | 6 | 7 | 8 | 9 | 10 | 11 | 12 | 13 | 14 | 15 | 16 | 17 | 18 | 19 | 20 | Pts | Pos | 21 | 22 | 23 |

e: retired or mechanical failure • m: exclusion for exceeding two minute time allowance • t: exclusion for touching the tapes • x: other exclusion • f: fell
ns: non-starter • nc: non-classify
Semi-finals: Heat 21: Riders placed 1st, 4th, 6th & 7th in the intermediate classification (after 20 heats)
Heat 22: Riders placed 2nd, 3rd, 5th & 8th in the intermediate classification (after 20 heats)
Big Final (heat 23): The first and second placed riders in each of the Semi-Finals

| gate A – inside | gate B | gate C | gate D – outside |

=== Heat after heat ===
1. (60,92) Jonsson, Pedersen, Lindbäck, Holta
2. (60,17) Sayfutdinov, Bjerre, Hampel, Žagar
3. (60,39) Hancock, Laguta, Holder, Kołodziej
4. (60,32) Harris, Lindgren, Crump, Gollob
5. (60,98) Harris, Holder, Jonsson, Hampel
6. (60,84) Sayfutdinov, Laguta, Lindgren, Pedersen (Fx)
7. (60,81) Gollob, Hancock, Žagar, Lindbäck
8. (59,84) Bjerre, Holta, Kołodziej, Crump
9. (60,65) Hancock, Crump, Sayfutdinov, Jonsson (F)
10. (60,03) Hampel, Pedersen, Gollob, Kołodzej
11. (60,34) Lindgren, Bjerre, Holder, Lindbäck
12. (60,98) Harris, Žagar, Holta, Laguta
13. (61,26) Jonsson, Lindgren, Žagar, Kołodziej
14. (61,15) Hancock, Harris, Bjerre, Pedersen
15. (60,25) Hampel, Crump, Lindbäck, Laguta
16. (60,98) Sayfutdinov, Holta, Holder, Gollob
17. (61,78) Bjerre, Jonsson, Gollob, Laguta
18. (61,81) Crump, Holder, Žagar, Pedersen
19. (62,02) Kołodziej, Harris, Lindbäck, Sayfutdinov
20. (61,42) Holta, Hampel, Hancock, Lindgren
  Semi-finals:
21. (61,09) Jonsson, Harris, Holta, Sayfutdinov
22. (61,68) Hancock, Lindgren, Bjerre, Hampel
  the Final:
23. (61,65) Jonsson (6 points), Harris (4), Lindgren (2), Hancock (0)

== The intermediate classification ==
Qualifies for next season's Grand Prix series
Full-time Grand Prix rider
Wild card, track reserve or qualified reserve

| Pos. | Rider | Points | EUR (Poland) | SWE (Sweden) | CZE (Czech Republic) | DEN (Denmark) | GBR (United Kingdom) | ITA (Italy) | SCA (Sweden) | POL (Poland) | NOR (Denmark) | CRO (Croatia) | PL2 (Poland) |
| Gold | (United States) (5) Greg Hancock | 154 | 14 | 10 | 23 | 13 | 20 | 15 | 9 | 13 | 22 | 15 | |
| 2 | (Sweden) (9) Andreas Jonsson | 118 | 5 | 6 | 8 | 7 | 10 | 17 | 19 | 20 | 8 | 18 | |
| 3 | (Poland) (2) Jarosław Hampel | 117 | 12 | 5 | 19 | 12 | 5 | 12 | 17 | 18 | 8 | 9 | |
| 4 | (Australia) (3) Jason Crump | 104 | 5 | 6 | 13 | 18 | 8 | 6 | 16 | 7 | 17 | 8 | |
| 5 | (Poland) (1) Tomasz Gollob | 98 | 18 | 6 | 17 | 20 | 7 | 5 | 3 | 12 | 5 | 5 | |
| 6 | (Russia) (12) Emil Sayfutdinov | 98 | 14 | 8 | 6 | 7 | 13 | 11 | 13 | 7 | 9 | 10 | |
| 7 | (Denmark) (7) Kenneth Bjerre | 97 | 10 | 2 | 9 | 6 | 11 | 12 | 16 | 6 | 13 | 12 | |
| 8 | (Australia) (8) Chris Holder | 95 | 9 | 10 | 9 | 14 | 15 | 6 | 7 | 7 | 11 | 7 | |
| 9 | (Sweden) (11) Fredrik Lindgren | 85 | 11 | 6 | 9 | 9 | 5 | 7 | 8 | 5 | 13 | 12 | |
| 10 | (Denmark) (10) Nicki Pedersen | 79 | 17 | 4 | 9 | 7 | 16 | 3 | 3 | 6 | 10 | 4 | |
| 11 | (Sweden) (14) Antonio Lindbäck | 69 | 1 | 9 | 6 | 5 | 3 | 17 | 7 | 12 | 6 | 3 | |
| 12 | (United Kingdom) (6) Chris Harris | 67 | 7 | 4 | 3 | 7 | 6 | 6 | 10 | 0 | 5 | 19 | |
| 13 | (Poland) (4) Rune Holta | 53 | 9 | 1 | 7 | 6 | 1 | 5 | 4 | 8 | 3 | 9 | |
| 14 | (Poland) (15) Janusz Kołodziej | 45 | 8 | 9 | 1 | 3 | 7 | 10 | 1 | – | 2 | 4 | |
| 15 | (Russia) (13) Artem Laguta | 25 | 0 | 1 | 2 | 7 | – | – | 1 | 1 | 9 | 4 | |
| 16 | (Sweden) (19) Magnus Zetterström | 19 | – | – | – | – | 9 | 3 | – | 7 | – | – | |
| 17 | (Sweden) (16) Thomas H. Jonasson | 17 | – | 8 | – | – | – | – | 9 | – | – | – | |
| 18 | (Australia) (16) Darcy Ward | 15 | – | – | – | – | – | – | – | 15 | – | – | |
| 19 | (Slovenia) (16) Matej Žagar | 14 | – | – | – | – | – | 9 | – | – | – | 5 | |
| 20 | (United Kingdom) (16) Scott Nicholls | 5 | – | – | – | – | 5 | – | – | – | – | – | |
| 21 | (Poland) (16) Damian Baliński | 4 | 4 | – | – | – | – | – | – | – | – | – | |
| 22 | (Czech Republic) (16) Matěj Kůs | 3 | – | – | 3 | – | – | – | – | – | – | – | |
| 23 | (Denmark) (16) Bjarne Pedersen | 3 | – | – | – | – | – | – | – | – | 3 | – | |
| 24 | (Denmark) (16) Mikkel B. Jensen | 2 | – | – | – | 2 | – | – | – | – | – | – | |
| 25 | (United Kingdom) (17) Tai Woffinden | 2 | – | – | – | – | 2 | – | – | – | – | – | |
| 26 | (Sweden) (17) Simon Gustafsson | 1 | – | 1 | – | – | – | – | ns | – | – | – | |
| 27 | (Sweden) (18) Dennis Andersson | 0 | – | 0 | – | – | – | – | – | – | – | – | |
Rider(s) not classified
| | (Poland) (17) Patryk Dudek | — | ns | – | – | – | – | – | – | – | – | – | |
| | (Poland) (18) Maciej Janowski | — | ns | – | – | – | – | – | – | – | – | – | |
| | (Czech Republic) (17) Lukáš Dryml | — | – | – | ns | – | – | – | – | – | – | – | |
| | (Czech Republic) (18) Zdeněk Simota | — | – | – | ns | – | – | – | – | – | – | – | |
| | (Denmark) (17) Michael Jepsen Jensen | — | – | – | – | ns | – | – | – | – | – | – | |
| | (Denmark) (18) Kenneth Arendt Larsen | — | – | – | – | ns | – | – | – | – | – | – | |
| | (United Kingdom) (18) Ben Barker | — | – | – | – | – | ns | – | – | – | – | – | |
| | (Italy) (17) Mattia Carpanese | — | – | – | – | – | – | ns | – | – | – | – | |
| | (Italy) (18) Guglielmo Franchetti | — | – | – | – | – | – | ns | – | – | – | – | |
| | (Sweden) (18) Linus Sundström | — | – | – | – | – | – | – | ns | – | – | – | |
| | (Poland) (17) Piotr Pawlicki, Jr. | — | – | – | – | – | – | – | – | ns | – | – | |
| | (Poland) (18) Emil Pulczyński | — | – | – | – | – | – | – | – | ns | – | – | |
| | (Denmark) (17) Michael Jepsen Jensen | — | – | – | – | – | – | – | – | – | ns | – | |
| | (Denmark) (18) Mikkel Michelsen | — | – | – | – | – | – | – | – | – | ns | – | |
| | (Croatia) (17) Dino Kovačić | — | – | – | – | – | – | – | – | – | – | ns | |
| | (Slovenia) (18) Matija Duh | — | – | – | – | – | – | – | – | – | – | ns | |
| Pos. | Rider | Points | EUR (Poland) | SWE (Sweden) | CZE (Czech Republic) | DEN (Denmark) | GBR (United Kingdom) | ITA (Italy) | SCA (Sweden) | POL (Poland) | NOR (Denmark) | CRO (Croatia) | PL2 (Poland) |

== See also ==
- motorcycle speedway
