= 2011 Speedway Grand Prix of Europe =

Grand Prix

(Poland) 2011 Speedway Grand Prix of Europe
- FIM Fogo European Speedway Grand Prix

Information
- Date: 30 April 2011
- City: (Poland) Leszno
- Event: 1 of 11 (134)
- Referee: (United Kingdom) Craig Ackroyd
- Jury President: (Sweden) Christer Bergstrom

Stadium details
- Stadium: Alfred Smoczyk Stadium
- Length: 330 m (360 yd)

SGP Results
- Attendance: 15,000
- Best Time: (Russia) Emil Sayfutdinov; 60,91 secs (in Heat 3)
- (gold) Winner: (Denmark) Nicki Pedersen
- (silver) Runner-up: (Poland) Tomasz Gollob
- (bronze) 3rd place: (Russia) Emil Sayfutdinov

The 2011 FIM Fogo European Speedway Grand Prix was the first race of the 2011 Speedway Grand Prix season. It took place on 30 April at the Alfred Smoczyk Stadium in Leszno, Poland.

It was fourth SGP event held in Leszno. Grand Prix was won by Dane Nicki Pedersen who beat defending World Champion Pole Tomasz Gollob, Russian Emil Sayfutdinov and Vice-Champion Jarosław Hampel from Poland. Gollob, scoring 18 points, becoming Championship leader.

== Riders ==
The Speedway Grand Prix Commission nominated Damian Baliński as Wild Card, and Patryk Dudek and Maciej Janowski both as Track Reserves. The Draw was made on 29 April by Tomasz Malepszy, President (=Mayor) of Leszno. Hampel, Kołodziej and Baliński are ridding for Unia Leszno in the 2011 Speedway Ekstraliga.

== Heat details ==
Placing	Draw	Rider	Total	1	2	3	4	5	6	7	8	9	10	11	12	13	14	15	16	17	18	19	20	Pts	Pos	21	22	23
1	6	(Denmark) (10) Nicki Pedersen	17		1				2			3							2			1		9	8		2	3
2	2	(Poland) (1) Tomasz Gollob	18	3					Fx				3				2				3			11	2		3	2
3	10	(Russia) (12) Emil Sayfutdinov	14			3			3						2			1		1				10	4	2		1
4	11	(Poland) (2) Jarosław Hampel	12			1				1		1					3						3	9	6	3		0
5	9	(United States) (5) Greg Hancock	14			2		3						3					3		2			13	1	1
6	3	(Sweden) (11) Fredrik Lindgren	11	1						3				2				2				3		11	3		Fx
7	12	(Denmark) (7) Kenneth Bjerre	10			Fx					3		1			3						2		9	5		1
8	8	(Poland) (4) Rune Holta	9		2						2			1			1			3				9	7	0
9	1	(Australia) (8) Chris Holder	9	2				1				2				2				2				9	9
10	5	(Poland) (15) Janusz Kołodziej	8		3			0					2					3					Fx	8	10
11	4	(United Kingdom) (6) Chris Harris	7	0							1				3				1				2	7	11
12	13	(Australia) (3) Jason Crump	5				3	2							0		0					0		5	12
13	7	(Sweden) (9) Andreas Jonsson	5		0					2					1	1					1			5	13
14	14	(Poland) (16) Damian Baliński	4				2		1					0		Fx							1	4	14
15	15	(Sweden) (14) Antonio Lindbäck	1				1			0			0						0	0				1	15
16	16	(Russia) (13) Artem Laguta	0				0				0	0						0			0			0	16
17	17	(Poland) (17) Patryk Dudek	-																					-	17
18	18	(Poland) (18) Maciej Janowski	-																					-	18
Placing	Draw	Rider	Total	1	2	3	4	5	6	7	8	9	10	11	12	13	14	15	16	17	18	19	20	Pts	Pos	21	22	23

e: retired or mechanical failure • m: exclusion for exceeding two minute time allowance • t: exclusion for touching the tapes • x: other exclusion • f: fell
ns: non-starter • nc: non-classify
Semi-finals: Heat 21: Riders placed 1st, 4th, 6th & 7th in the intermediate classification (after 20 heats)
Heat 22: Riders placed 2nd, 3rd, 5th & 8th in the intermediate classification (after 20 heats)
Big Final (heat 23): The first and second placed riders in each of the Semi-Finals

gate A – inside	gate B	gate C	gate D – outside

=== Heat after heat ===
1. (61,65) Gollob, Holder, Lindgren, Harris
2. (61,50 or 61,60) Kołodziej, Holta, Pedersen, Jonsson
3. (60,91) Sayfutdinov, Hancock, Hampel, Bjerre (Fx)
4. (61,45) Crump, Baliński, Lindbäck, Laguta
5. (61,03) Hancock, Crump, Holder, Kołodziej
6. (61,44) Sayfutdinov, Pedersen, Baliński, Gollob (Fx)
7. (61,09) Lindgren, Jonsson, Hampel, Lindbäck
8. (61,91) Bjerre, Holta, Harris, Laguta
9. (61,65) Pedersen, Holder, Hampel, Laguta
10. (61,85) Gollob, Kołodziej, Bjerre, Lindbäck
11. (61,88) Hancock, Lindgren, Holta, Baliński
12. (62,49) Harris, Sayfutdinov, Jonsson, Crump
13. (62,51) Bjerre, Holder, Jonsson, Baliński (Fx)
14. (61,87) Hampel, Gollob, Holta, Crump
15. (62,42) Kołodziej, Lindgren, Sayfutdinov, Laguta
16. (62,43) Hancock, Pedersen, Harris, Lindbäck
17. (62,55) Holta, Holder, Sayfutdinov, Lindbäck
18. (62,23) Gollob, Hancock, Jonsson, Laguta
19. (63,16) Lindgren, Bjerre, Pedersen, Crump
20. (63,27) Hampel, Harris, Baliński, Kołodziej (Fx)
  Semi-Finals:
21. (62,78) Hampel, Sayfutdinov, Hancock, Holta
22. (62,58) Gollob, Pedersen, Bjerre, Lindgren (Fx)
  the Final:
23. (63,07) Pedersen, Gollob, Sayfutdinov, Hampel

== The intermediate classification ==
Qualifies for next season's Grand Prix series
Full-time Grand Prix rider
Wild card, track reserve or qualified reserve

Pos.	Rider	Points	EUR (Poland)	SWE (Sweden)	CZE (Czech Republic)	DEN (Denmark)	GBR (United Kingdom)	ITA (Italy)	SCA (Sweden)	POL (Poland)	NOR (Denmark)	CRO (Croatia)	PL2 (Poland)
1	(Poland) (1) Tomasz Gollob	18	18										
2	(Denmark) (10) Nicki Pedersen	17	17										
3	(United States) (5) Greg Hancock	14	14										
4	(Russia) (12) Emil Sayfutdinov	14	14										
5	(Poland) (2) Jarosław Hampel	12	12										
6	(Sweden) (11) Fredrik Lindgren	11	11										
7	(Denmark) (7) Kenneth Bjerre	10	10										
8	(Poland) (4) Rune Holta	9	9										
9	(Australia) (8) Chris Holder	9	9										
10	(Poland) (15) Janusz Kołodziej	8	8										
11	(United Kingdom) (6) Chris Harris	7	7										
12	(Australia) (3) Jason Crump	5	5										
13	(Sweden) (9) Andreas Jonsson	5	5										
14	(Poland) (16) Damian Baliński	4	4										
15	(Sweden) (14) Antonio Lindbäck	1	1										
16	(Russia) (13) Artem Laguta	0	0										
Rider(s) not classified
	(Poland) (17) Patryk Dudek	—	ns										
	(Poland) (18) Maciej Janowski	—	ns										
Pos.	Rider	Points	EUR (Poland)	SWE (Sweden)	CZE (Czech Republic)	DEN (Denmark)	GBR (United Kingdom)	ITA (Italy)	SCA (Sweden)	POL (Poland)	NOR (Denmark)	CRO (Croatia)	PL2 (Poland)

== See also ==
- motorcycle speedway
