= 2010 Individual Junior Ice Racing European Championship =

2010 Individual Under-25 Ice Racing European Championship

Seasons
- ← 2009 2011 →

The 2010 Individual Junior Ice Racing European Championship was the second annual UEM Individual Junior Ice Racing European Championship, but first time for under 25 rider. The final was held in Kamensk-Uralsky, Russia on 30 and 31 January 2010, and was won by Sergey Karachintsev.

== The Final ==
- January 30–31, 2010
- RUS Kamensk-Uralsky, Sverdlovsk Oblast
- “Metallurg” stadium (Length: 280 m)
- Referee: (France) T. Bouin
- Jury President: (Ukraine) S. Lyatosinsky
- References

Pos.	Rider	Total	Day One		Day Two	
Pos.	Rider	Total	Points	Details	Points	Details
1	(Russia) (1) Sergey Karachintsev	28	14	(3,2,3,3,3)	14	(3,3,3,3,2)
2	(Russia) (2) Andrey Gavrilkin	25	13	(1,3,3,3,3)	12	(2,3,3,2,2)
3	(Russia) (4) Maxim Korchemaha	24+3	9	(2,3,1,3,Fx)	15	(3,3,3,3,3)
4	(Russia) (13) Aleksander Rodin	24+2	12	(3,3,3,2,1)	12	(1,3,2,3,3)
5	(Russia) (5) Dmitri Koltakov	21	11	(3,1,2,2,3)	10	(3,1,Fx,3,3)
6	(Russia) (7) Maxim Karpukhin	16	9	(2,3,0,2,2)	7	(2,2,F,2,1)
7	(Russia) (8) Nikita Alekseev	16	9	(1,2,3,1,2)	7	(2,2,Fx,1,2)
8	(Ukraine) (3) Nikolay Kaminskyy	15	8	(0,0,2,3,3)	7	(3,2,2,Fx,F)
9	(Russia) (6) Anton Zmaga	15	7	(R,2,2,1,2)	8	(1,1,1,2,3)
10	(Germany) (14) Florian Fürst	10	4	(R,1,0,1,2)	6	(0,0,3,2,1)
11	(Russia) (10) Christoph Kirchner	8	4	(1,0,2,1,0)	4	(0,2,2,0,0)
12	(Russia) (15) Daniel Belonogov	8	6	(1,1,1,2,1)	2	(0,1,F,N,1)
13	(Russia) (12) Eugene Kosov	7	3	(2,1,0,0,0)	4	(1,0,0,1,2)
14	(Russia) (16) Aleksander Kochetov	7	3	(2,0,0,0,1)	4	(2,0,1,1,0)
15	(Russia) (11) Dmitry Tikhonov	6	6	(3,2,1,0,R)	—	(-,-,-,-,-)
16	(Russia) (18) Vitaly Belousov	5	—	—	5	(1,1,1,1,1)
17	(Russia) (9) Maxim Koltakov	5	1	(0,0,1,0,0)	—	(-,-,-,-,-)
18	(Russia) (17) Rustam Akumbaev	0	—	—	0	(0,0,0,0,0)

Two Swedish place (#1 and #9) and two Finnish place (#8 and #12) was replaced by Russian rider. One Dutch place (#10) was replaced by German rider.
At the day two, Tikhonov (#11) was replaced by Akumbaev (#17), and Koltakov (#9) was replaced by Belousov (#18).

== See also ==
- 2010 Individual Ice Racing World Championship
- 2010 Individual Ice Racing European Championship
- Ice speedway
