= 2011 Individual Ice Racing World Championship finals =

World ice racing tournament

The 2011 Individual Ice Racing World Championship were the final meetings took place from February 5 to March 27, 2011, and determined the world champion for the 2011 Individual Ice Racing World Championship. There were four final meetings (all two-day) with seventeen permanent riders and one wild card. The permanent riders were determined in three qualifying rounds.

== Heat details ==
=== Final One - Krasnogorsk ===
- 5–6 February 2011
- (Russia) Krasnogorsk, Moscow Oblast
- City stadium "Zorkey" (Length: 440 m)
- Referee: (Poland) Wojciech Grodzki
- Jury President: (Czech Republic) Milan Spinka
- References

==== Day One ====
Placing	Draw	Rider Name	Total GP Pts	Qualifying Round																						Finals			
Placing	Draw	Rider Name	Total GP Pts	1	2	3	4	5	6	7	8	9	10	11	12	13	14	15	16	17	18	19	20	Pts	Pos	D	C	B	A
1	10	(Russia) Nikolay Krasnikov	25			3			3						3			3		3				15	1				3
2	12	(Russia) Igor Kononov	20			2					3		3			3						0		11	4				2
3	13	(Russia) Dmitri Khomitsevitch	18				3	3							2		3					3		14	2				1
4	15	(Russia) Daniil Ivanov	16				2			3			2						3	2				12	3				0
5	16	(Russia) Vitali Khomitsevitch	14				1				1	3						2			3			10	6			3	
6	8	(Russia) Dmitry Bulankin	13		3						2			3			2			1				11	5			2	
7	4	(Russia) Ivan Ivanov	12	3							F				1				1				3	8	7			1	
8	7	(Germany) Günther Bauer	11		2					2					0	2					1			7	8			0	
9	1	(Russia) Sergey Karachintsev	10	2				2				2				1				0				7	9		3		
10	9	(Sweden) Stefan Svensson	9			0		1						2					2		2			7	10		2		
11	6	(Austria) Harald Simon	8		1				2			1							T			1		5	12		1		
12	11	(Austria) Franz Zorn	7			1				1		0					1						2	5	11		0		
13	3	(Sweden) Peter Koij	6	F						0				0				1				2		3	13	3			
14	5	(Germany) Stefan Pletschacher	5		0			0					R					0					1	1	16	2			
15	2	(Poland) Grzegorz Knapp	4	1					0				1				0				0			2	15	1			
16	14	(Netherlands) Johnny Tuinstra	3				0		1					1		0							0	2	14	0			
17	17	(Finland) Mats Järf	0																F					0	17				
	18	(Czech Republic) Antonín Klatovský	–																					–					
Placing	Draw	Rider Name	Total GP Pts	1	2	3	4	5	6	7	8	9	10	11	12	13	14	15	16	17	18	19	20	Pts	Pos	D	C	B	A
Placing	Draw	Rider Name	Total GP Pts	Qualifying Round																						Finals			

M - exclusion for exceeding two minute time allowance • T - exclusion for touching the tapes • X - other exclusion • E - retired or mechanical failure • F - fell
# - jacket number, if different as draw number

gate A – inside Red	gate B Blue	gate C White	gate D – outside Yellow-Black

==== Day Two ====
(2) Knapp, ranked 15th ←→ (17) Järf
(14) Tuinstra, ranked 16th ←→ (18) Klatovský

Placing	Draw	Rider Name	Total GP Pts	Qualifying Round																						Finals			
Placing	Draw	Rider Name	Total GP Pts	1	2	3	4	5	6	7	8	9	10	11	12	13	14	15	16	17	18	19	20	Pts	Pos	D	C	B	A
1	10	(Russia) Nikolay Krasnikov	25	3							3				3				3	3				15	1				3
2	12	(Russia) Igor Kononov	20		2					3					2	3					3			13	3				2
3	15	(Russia) Daniil Ivanov	18		1						2			3			3						3	12	4				1
4	16	(Russia) Vitali Khomitsevitch	16		3				3			3							2			2		13	2				0
5	13	(Russia) Dmitri Khomitsevitch	14			3					Fx		3			2						3		11	5			3	
6	4	(Russia) Ivan Ivanov	13		0			3					2					2		2				9	6			2	
7	8	(Russia) Dmitry Bulankin	12	1						1				2				3				1		8	7			1	
8	1	(Russia) Sergey Karachintsev	11			2				2		2					2			0				8	8			0	
9	9	(Sweden) Stefan Svensson	10				2	2							1		M/-					0		5	11		3		
10	14	(Czech Republic) Antonín Klatovský	9			1		1						0					1		2			5	12		2		
11	7	(Germany) Günther Bauer	8				3		1					1		1				1				7	9		1		
12	6	(Austria) Harald Simon	7	2					2				1				0				1			6	10		0		
13	11	(Austria) Franz Zorn	6				1				1	1						1			0			4	13	3			
14	3	(Sweden) Peter Koij	5	0				0				0				0							2	2	14	2			
15	17	(Poland) Grzegorz Knapp	4														1							1	16	1			
16	5	(Germany) Stefan Pletschacher	3				0			0			0						0				1	1	15	0			
17	2	(Finland) Mats Järf	0			0			0						0			0					0	0	17				
	18	(Netherlands) Johnny Tuinstra	–																					–					
Placing	Draw	Rider Name	Total GP Pts	1	2	3	4	5	6	7	8	9	10	11	12	13	14	15	16	17	18	19	20	Pts	Pos	D	C	B	A
Placing	Draw	Rider Name	Total GP Pts	Qualifying Round																						Finals			

M - exclusion for exceeding two minute time allowance • T - exclusion for touching the tapes • X - other exclusion • E - retired or mechanical failure • F - fell
# - jacket number, if different as draw number

gate A – inside Red	gate B Blue	gate C White	gate D – outside Yellow-Black

=== Final Two - Tolyatti ===
- 12–13 February 2011
- (Russia) Tolyatti, Samara Oblast
- Anatoly Stepanov Stadium (Length: 260 m)
- Referee: (Germany) F.Ziegler
- Jury President: (France) C.Bouin
- References

==== Day Three ====
- Pletschacher, ranked 16th ←→ (17) Knapp
- Järf, ranked 18th ←→ (18) Tuinstra

Placing	Draw	Rider Name	Total GP Pts	Qualifying Round																						Finals			
Placing	Draw	Rider Name	Total GP Pts	1	2	3	4	5	6	7	8	9	10	11	12	13	14	15	16	17	18	19	20	Pts	Pos	D	C	B	A
1	2	(Russia) Daniil Ivanov	25	3					3				3				3				3			15	1				3
2	8	(Russia) Dmitri Khomitsevitch	20		2						2			3			2			3				12	4				2
3	13	(Russia) Nikolay Krasnikov	18				3	3							3		Fx					3		12	3				1
4	16	(Russia) Igor Kononov	16				2				3	3						3			2			13	2				0
5	7	(Russia) Dmitry Bulankin	14		3					3					1	3					1			11	5			3	
6	3	(Russia) Sergey Karachintsev	13	2						2				2				2				2		10	7			2	
7	10	(Russia) Ivan Ivanov	12			3			2						0			1		2				8	8			1	
8	4	(Russia) Vitali Khomitsevitch	11	1							1				2				3				3	10	6			0	
9	14	(Sweden) Stefan Svensson	10				0		1					1		2							2	6	9		3		
10	6	(Czech Republic) Antonín Klatovský	9		1				0			2							1			1		5	11		2		
11	12	(Austria) Franz Zorn	8			2					0		1			1						0		4	12		1		
12	15	(Austria) Harald Simon	7				1			1			2						2	Fx				6	10		N		
13	5	(Poland) Grzegorz Knapp	6		0			2					F					0					0	2	14	3			
14	1	(Sweden) Peter Koij	5	0				1				0				0				1				2	15	2			
15	9	(Netherlands) Johnny Tuinstra	4			0		0						0					0		0			0	16	1			
16	11	(Germany) Günther Bauer	3			1				0		1					1						1	4	13	0			
	17	(Germany) Stefan Pletschacher	–																					–					
	18	(Finland) Mats Järf	–																					–					
Placing	Draw	Rider Name	Total GP Pts	1	2	3	4	5	6	7	8	9	10	11	12	13	14	15	16	17	18	19	20	Pts	Pos	D	C	B	A
Placing	Draw	Rider Name	Total GP Pts	Qualifying Round																						Finals			

M - exclusion for exceeding two minute time allowance • T - exclusion for touching the tapes • X - other exclusion • E - retired or mechanical failure • F - fell
# - jacket number, if different as draw number

gate A – inside Red	gate B Blue	gate C White	gate D – outside Yellow-Black

==== Day Four ====
- Knapp, ranked 15th ←→ (17) Pletschacher
- Tuinstra, ranked 17th ←→ (18) Järf

Placing	Draw	Rider Name	Total GP Pts	Qualifying Round																						Finals			
Placing	Draw	Rider Name	Total GP Pts	1	2	3	4	5	6	7	8	9	10	11	12	13	14	15	16	17	18	19	20	Pts	Pos	D	C	B	A
1	8	(Russia) Dmitri Khomitsevitch	25	3						3				3				3				3		15	1				
2	13	(Russia) Nikolay Krasnikov	20			3					3		3			3						2		14	2				
3	16	(Russia) Igor Kononov	18		3				3			3							3			Fx		12	3				
4	2	(Russia) Daniil Ivanov	16			2			2						3			2					3	12	4				
5	4	(Russia) Vitali Khomitsevitch	14		2			3					2					Fx		3				10	5				
6	3	(Russia) Sergey Karachintsev	13	2				2				2				2							2	10	6				
7	6	(Czech Republic) Antonín Klatovský	12	X					1				1				3				3			8	7				
8	7	(Russia) Dmitry Bulankin	11				3		X					2		Fx				2				7	8				
9	14	(Sweden) Stefan Svensson	10			1		1						1					2		2			7	9				
10	10	(Russia) Ivan Ivanov	9	1							2				2				1	1				7	10				
11	11	(Germany) Günther Bauer	8				2				1	1						1			1			6	11				
12	12	(Austria) Franz Zorn	7		0					2					1	1					0			4	12				
13	15	(Austria) Harald Simon	6		1						0			M/-			2						X	3	13				
14	5	(Germany) Stefan Pletschacher	5				1			1			0						0				1	3	14				
15	9	(Finland) Mats Järf	4				0	0							0		1					1		2	15				
16	1	(Sweden) Peter Koij	3			0				0		0					0			0				0	16				
17	17	(Poland) Grzegorz Knapp	0											0										0	17				
	18	(Netherlands) Johnny Tuinstra	–																					–					
Placing	Draw	Rider Name	Total GP Pts	1	2	3	4	5	6	7	8	9	10	11	12	13	14	15	16	17	18	19	20	Pts	Pos	D	C	B	A
Placing	Draw	Rider Name	Total GP Pts	Qualifying Round																						Finals			

M - exclusion for exceeding two minute time allowance • T - exclusion for touching the tapes • X - other exclusion • E - retired or mechanical failure • F - fell
# - jacket number, if different as draw number

gate A – inside Red	gate B Blue	gate C White	gate D – outside Yellow-Black

=== Final Three - Assen ===
- 12–13 March 2011
- (Netherlands) Assen, Drenthe
- De Bonte Wever stadium (Length: 370 m)
- Referee: (Germany) Frank Ziegler
- Jury President: (Poland) Andrzej Grodzki
- References
- Change:

Draw 4. (Netherlands) Johnny Tuinstra → René Stellingwerf

==== Day Five ====
- Pletschacher, ranked 16th ←→ (17) Knapp
- Järf, ranked 18th ←→ (18) Tuinstra

Placing	Draw	Rider Name	Total GP Pts	Qualifying Round																						Finals			
Placing	Draw	Rider Name	Total GP Pts	1	2	3	4	5	6	7	8	9	10	11	12	13	14	15	16	17	18	19	20	Pts	Pos	D	C	B	A
1	2	(Russia) Igor Kononov	25	3					3				2				3				3			14	2				3
2	15	(Russia) Nikolay Krasnikov	20				3			3			3						3	2				14	1				2
3	16	(Russia) Daniil Ivanov	18				2				3	3						3			1			12	3				1
4	7	(Russia) Dmitri Khomitsevitch	16		3					2					2	3					2			12	4				0
5	1	(Russia) Dmitry Bulankin	14	2				3				2				2				3				12	5			3	
6	10	(Austria) Harald Simon	13			1			2						3			2		1				9	7			2	
7	5	(Russia) Ivan Ivanov	12		2			0					1					1					3	7	8			1	
8	9	(Russia) Vitali Khomitsevitch	11			3		2						3					2		0			10	6			Fx	
9	6	(Poland) Grzegorz Knapp	10		1				0			1							1			2		5	12		3		
10	8	(Sweden) Stefan Svensson	9		X						2			2			1			0				5	11		2		
11	12	(Germany) Günther Bauer	8			2					1		0			0						3		6	9		1		
12	14	(Austria) Franz Zorn	7				1		1					1		1							2	6	10		0		
13	3	(Czech Republic) Antonín Klatovský	6	1						1				0				0				1		3	14	3			
14	13	(Russia) Sergey Karachintsev	5				0	1							F		2					0		3	13	2			
16	11	(Sweden) Peter Koij	3			0				0		0					0						0	0	16	1			
15	4	(Netherlands) René Stellingwerf	4	0							0				1				0				1	2	15	Fx			
	17	(Germany) Stefan Pletschacher	–																					–					
	18	(Finland) Mats Järf	–																					–					
Placing	Draw	Rider Name	Total GP Pts	1	2	3	4	5	6	7	8	9	10	11	12	13	14	15	16	17	18	19	20	Pts	Pos	D	C	B	A
Placing	Draw	Rider Name	Total GP Pts	Qualifying Round																						Finals			

M - exclusion for exceeding two minute time allowance • T - exclusion for touching the tapes • X - other exclusion • E - retired or mechanical failure • F - fell
# - jacket number, if different as draw number

gate A – inside Red	gate B Blue	gate C White	gate D – outside Yellow-Black

==== Day Six ====
- Koij, ranked 15th ←→ (17) Pletschacher
- Tuinstra, ranked 17th ←→ (18) Järf

Placing	Draw	Rider Name	Total GP Pts	Qualifying Round																						Finals			
Placing	Draw	Rider Name	Total GP Pts	1	2	3	4	5	6	7	8	9	10	11	12	13	14	15	16	17	18	19	20	Pts	Pos	D	C	B	A
1	16	(Russia) Daniil Ivanov	25		3				2			3							3			3		14	1				3
2	7	(Russia) Dmitri Khomitsevitch	20				3		1					2		3				3				12	3				2
3	15	(Russia) Nikolay Krasnikov	18		2						3			3			2						3	13	2				1
4	9	(Russia) Vitali Khomitsevitch	16				2	3							3		3					1		12	4				0
5	2	(Russia) Igor Kononov	14			3			3						Fx			3					F	9	6			3	
6	14	(Austria) Franz Zorn	13			2		2						1					2		3			10	5			2	
7	5	(Russia) Ivan Ivanov	12				1			2			3						1				2	9	7			1	
8	13	(Russia) Sergey Karachintsev	11			1					2		2			2						2		9	8			0	
9	1	(Russia) Dmitry Bulankin	10			0				3		2					1			1				7	10		3		
10	10	(Austria) Harald Simon	9	3							1				1				0	2				7	9		2		
11	12	(Germany) Günther Bauer	8		1					1					2	1					2			7	11		1		
12	8	(Sweden) Stefan Svensson	7	2						0				0				2				Fx		4	12		0		
13	4	(Poland) Grzegorz Knapp	6		0			1					1					1		0				3	14	3			
14	11	(Finland) Mats Järf	5				0				0	0						0			1			1	15	2			
15	3	(Czech Republic) Antonín Klatovský	4	1				0				1				0							1	3	13	1			
16	6	(Germany) Stefan Pletschacher	3	0					0				0				0				R			0	16	0			
	17	(Sweden) Peter Koij	–																					–					
	18	(Netherlands) René Stellingwerf	–																					–					
Placing	Draw	Rider Name	Total GP Pts	1	2	3	4	5	6	7	8	9	10	11	12	13	14	15	16	17	18	19	20	Pts	Pos	D	C	B	A
Placing	Draw	Rider Name	Total GP Pts	Qualifying Round																						Finals			

M - exclusion for exceeding two minute time allowance • T - exclusion for touching the tapes • X - other exclusion • E - retired or mechanical failure • F - fell
# - jacket number, if different as draw number

gate A – inside Red	gate B Blue	gate C White	gate D – outside Yellow-Black

=== Final Four - Inzell ===
- 26–27 March 2011
- (Germany) Inzell, Bavaria
- Eisstadion Inzell (Ludwig-Schwabl-Stadion) (Length: 400 m)
- Referee: (Sweden) Krister Gardell
- Jury President: (Denmark) Jörgen L. Jensen
- References
- Change:

Draw 4. (Finland) Mats Järf → Jan Klatovský

==== Day Seven ====
- Pletschacher, ranked 16th ←→ (17) Koij
- Järf, ranked 17th ←→ (18) Stellingwerf

Placing	Draw	Rider Name	Total GP Pts	Qualifying Round																						Finals			
Placing	Draw	Rider Name	Total GP Pts	1	2	3	4	5	6	7	8	9	10	11	12	13	14	15	16	17	18	19	20	Pts	Pos	D	C	B	A
	1	(Russia) Dmitri Khomitsevitch	–																					–					
	2	(Sweden) Peter Koij	–																					–					
	3	(Russia) Sergey Karachintsev	–																					–					
	4	(Russia) Daniil Ivanov	–																					–					
	5	(Russia) Dmitry Bulankin	–																					–					
	6	(Russia) Igor Kononov	–																					–					
	7	(Poland) Grzegorz Knapp	–																					–					
	8	(Germany) Max Niedermaier	–																					–					
	9	(Austria) Harald Simon	–																					–					
	10	(Czech Republic) Antonin Klatovsky	–																					–					
	11	(Russia) Ivan Ivanov	–																					–					
	12	(Sweden) Stefan Svensson	–																					–					
	13	(Russia) Nikolay Krasnikov	–																					–					
	14	(Germany) Günther Bauer	–																					–					
	15	(Russia) Vitali Khomitsevitch	–																					–					
	16	(Austria) Franz Zorn	–																					–					
	17	(Germany) Stefan Pletschacher	–																					–					
	18	(Czech Republic) Jan Klatovský	–																					–					
Placing	Draw	Rider Name	Total GP Pts	1	2	3	4	5	6	7	8	9	10	11	12	13	14	15	16	17	18	19	20	Pts	Pos	D	C	B	A
Placing	Draw	Rider Name	Total GP Pts	Qualifying Round																						Finals			

M - exclusion for exceeding two minute time allowance • T - exclusion for touching the tapes • X - other exclusion • E - retired or mechanical failure • F - fell
# - jacket number, if different as draw number

gate A – inside Red	gate B Blue	gate C White	gate D – outside Yellow-Black

==== Day Eight ====
Placing	Draw	Rider Name	Total GP Pts	Qualifying Round																						Finals			
Placing	Draw	Rider Name	Total GP Pts	1	2	3	4	5	6	7	8	9	10	11	12	13	14	15	16	17	18	19	20	Pts	Pos	D	C	B	A
	1	(Russia) Dmitri Khomitsevitch	–																					–					
	2	(Sweden) Peter Koij	–																					–					
	3	(Russia) Sergey Karachintsev	–																					–					
	4	(Russia) Daniil Ivanov	–																					–					
	5	(Russia) Dmitry Bulankin	–																					–					
	6	(Russia) Igor Kononov	–																					–					
	7	(Poland) Grzegorz Knapp	–																					–					
	8	(Germany) Max Niedermaier	–																					–					
	9	(Austria) Harald Simon	–																					–					
	10	(Czech Republic) Antonin Klatovsky	–																					–					
	11	(Russia) Ivan Ivanov	–																					–					
	12	(Sweden) Stefan Svensson	–																					–					
	13	(Russia) Nikolay Krasnikov	–																					–					
	14	(Germany) Günther Bauer	–																					–					
	15	(Russia) Vitali Khomitsevitch	–																					–					
	16	(Austria) Franz Zorn	–																					–					
	17	(Germany) Stefan Pletschacher	–																					–					
	18	(Czech Republic) Jan Klatovsky	–																					–					
Placing	Draw	Rider Name	Total GP Pts	1	2	3	4	5	6	7	8	9	10	11	12	13	14	15	16	17	18	19	20	Pts	Pos	D	C	B	A
Placing	Draw	Rider Name	Total GP Pts	Qualifying Round																						Finals			

M - exclusion for exceeding two minute time allowance • T - exclusion for touching the tapes • X - other exclusion • E - retired or mechanical failure • F - fell
# - jacket number, if different as draw number

gate A – inside Red	gate B Blue	gate C White	gate D – outside Yellow-Black

== See also ==
- 2011 Team Ice Racing World Championship
- 2011 Speedway Grand Prix Qualification
