= 2011 Individual Ice Racing European Championship =

Seasons
- ← 2010 2012 →

The 2011 Individual Ice Racing European Championship is the 2011 version of UEM Individual Ice Racing European Championship season. The final will be host in Tolyatti, Samara Oblast, Russia on 30 January 2011.

== Qualifications ==
=== Semi-final ===
- RUS Tolyatti, Samara Oblast
- 29 January 2011
- Anatoly Stepanov Stadium (Length: 260 m)
- Referee and Jury President: TBA
- References

== The Final ==
- RUS Tolyatti, Samara Oblast
- 30 January 2011
- Anatoly Stepanov Stadium (Length: 260 m)
- Referee and Jury President: TBA
- References

== See also ==
- 2011 Individual Ice Racing World Championship
- Ice speedway
