= 2011 Individual Ice Racing World Championship qualification =

This page describes the qualifying procedure for the 2011 Individual Ice Racing World Championship finals.

The 2011 Individual Ice Racing World Championship events will take place from January to March 2011. The champion will be determined in eight final meetings. A seventeen permanent riders will be determined in three Qualifying Rounds hosted in January.

== Qualification system ==
In three Qualifying Rounds will started 48 riders from 13 nationan federation and to Final series will qualify top 5 from each meetings and 6th placed riders from QR1 and QR2 as a track reserve during a Final One (Day 1).

Qualifying Rounds	(Czech Republic)	(United Kingdom)	(Germany)	(Switzerland)	(France)	(Ukraine)	(Netherlands)	(Russia)	(Norway)	(Austria)	(Poland)	(Finland)	(Sweden)
QR1 (Austria) Sankt Johann	2		2	1			1	3	1	3		1	2
QR2 (Poland) Sanok	1		1		1	2		3		1	3	2	2
QR3 (Austria) Saalfelden	2	1	2	1			2	2		2		2	2

== Heat details ==
=== Qualifying Round One ===
- (Austria) Sankt Johann im Pongau, Salzburg
- 15 January 2011
- Speedwaystadion (Length: 380 m)
- Referee: (United Kingdom) Craig Ackroyd
- Jury President: (Sweden) Christer Bergström
- References

Placing	Rider	Total	1	2	3	4	5	6	7	8	9	10	11	12	13	14	15	16	17	18	19	20	Pts	Pos	21
1	(Russia) (16) Sergey Karachintsev	14				2				3	3						3			3			14	Q1	
2	(Austria) (6) Franz Zorn	14		3				3			2							3			3		14	Q2	
3	(Russia) (10) Ivan Ivanov	12			3			2						3			1		3				12	Q3	
4	(Russia) (3) Dmitri Bulankin	11	2						3				3				2				1		11	Q4	
5	(Germany) (14) Stefan Pletschacher	10				3		1					2		2							2	10	Q5	
6	(Finland) (13) Mats Jarf	9				0	2							1		3					3		9	Q6	3
7	(Netherlands) (4) Johnny Tuinstra	9	1							2				2				1				3	9	7	2
8	(Czech Republic) (9) Jan Klatovsky	9			2		3						F					2		2			9	8	
9	(Sweden) (12) Per-Olof Serenius	8			1					1		3			3						0		8	9	
10	(Austria) (8) Martin Leitner	7		2						0			1			2			2				7	10	
11	(Sweden) (7) Fredrick Johansson	5		1					2					0	1					1			5	11	
12	(Germany) (1) Max Niedermayer	4	3				R				1				R				R				4	12	
13	(Czech Republic) (2) Andrej Divis	3	0					0				2				1				0			3	13	
14	(Switzerland) (11) Rene Dunki	2			0				1		0					Fx						1	2	14	
15	(Austria) (17) Johann Bruckner	2										1							1				2	15	
16	(Norway) (5) Jo Saetre	1		0			1					0					0					0	1	16	
17	(Austria) (15) Charlie Ebner	1				1			Fx			-						-	-				1	17	
18	(Austria) (18) Thomas Rathgeb	0																0					0	18	
Placing	Rider	Total	1	2	3	4	5	6	7	8	9	10	11	12	13	14	15	16	17	18	19	20	Pts	Pos	21

m - exclusion for exceeding two minute time allowance • t - exclusion for touching the tapes • x - other exclusion • e - retired or mechanical failure • f - fell • ns - non-starter • nc - non-classify

gate A - inside	gate B	gate C	gate D - outside

=== Qualifying Round Two ===
- (Poland) Sanok, Subcarpathian Voivodeship
- 21 January 2011
- Stadion "Błonie" (Length: 364 m)
- Referee: (United Kingdom) Mick Bates
- Jury President: (Germany) Wolfgang Glas
- References
- Change:

Draw 2. (Ukraine) Oleg Dosaev → Reserve 17.

Placing	Rider	Total	1	2	3	4	5	6	7	8	9	10	11	12	13	14	15	16	17	18	19	20	Pts	Pos	21
1	(Russia) (9) Nikolay Krasnikov	15			3		3						3					3		3			15	Q1	
2	(Russia) (14) Daniil Ivanov	14				3		3					2		3							3	14	Q2	
3	(Sweden) (1) Stefan Svensson	13	3				2				3				2				3				13	Q3	
4	(Russia) (4) Igor Kononov	12	2							3				3				2				2	12	Q4	
5	(Poland) (15) Grzegorz Knapp	11				2			3			3						1	2				11	Q5	
6	(Czech Republic) (12) Antonín Klatovský, Jr.	8			2					2		R			1						3		8	7	3
7	(Germany) (6) Florian Fürst	8		3				2			2							0			1		8	6	2
8	(Austria) (5) Martin Posch	7		Fx			1					2					3					1	7	8	
9	(Sweden) (11) Tommy Flyktman	6			1				1		1					3						0	6	9	
10	(Netherlands) (3) Sven Holstein	6	1						2				1				Fx				2		6	10	
11	(Poland) (8) Mirosław Daniszewski	5		2						R			R			2			1				5	11	
12	(Finland) (13) Henri Malinen	4				1	0							2		1					0		4	12	
13	(Czech Republic) (2) Radek Hutla	4	0					1				1				0				2			4	13	
14	(Austria) (16) Josef Kreuzberger	4				0				1	0						2			1			4	14	
15	(Finland) (7) Jouni Seppänen	2		1					0					1	0					0			2	15	
16	(France) (10) Claude Gadeyne	1			0			0						0			1		0				1	16	
	(Czech Republic) (17) Petr Klauz	0																					0		
Placing	Rider	Total	1	2	3	4	5	6	7	8	9	10	11	12	13	14	15	16	17	18	19	20	Pts	Pos	21

m - exclusion for exceeding two minute time allowance • t - exclusion for touching the tapes • x - other exclusion • e - retired or mechanical failure • f - fell • ns - non-starter • nc - non-classify

gate A - inside	gate B	gate C	gate D - outside

=== Qualifying Round Three ===
- (Austria) Saalfelden, Salzburg
- 22 January 2011
- Eis-Oval Lenzing Saalfelden (Length: 367 m)
- Referee: (Sweden) Krister Gardell
- Jury President: (Czech Republic) Petr Ondrasik
- References
- Change:

Draw #4 (Finland) Antti Aakko → Teppo Toivola

co-organized by the Dutch federation

Placing	Rider	Total	1	2	3	4	5	6	7	8	9	10	11	12	13	14	15	16	17	18	19	20	Pts	Pos	21
1	(Russia) (5) Dmitry Khomitsevich	15		3			3					3					3					3	15	Q1	
2	(Russia) (12) Vitaly Khomitsevich	13			3					2		2			3						3		13	3	3
3	(Austria) (6) Harald Simon	13		2				3			3							3			2		13	4	2
4	(Germany) (8) Günther Bauer	13		1						3			3			3			3				13	2	1
5	(Sweden) (9) Peter Koij	11			2		2						2					2		3			11	Q5	
6	(Sweden) (3) Per-Anders Lindström	10	3						3				1				2				1		10	6	
7	(Austria) (14) Mario Schwaiger	9				3		2					0		2							2	9	7	
8	(Czech Republic) (1) Jan Pecina	8	2				1				2				1				2				8	8	
9	(Germany) (16) Christof Kirchner	7				2				1	1						1			2			7	9	
10	(Finland) (4) Teppo Toivola	6	1							0				3				1				1	6	10	
11	(Netherlands) (7) Simon Reitsma	5		0					2					2	0					1			5	11	
12	(Netherlands) (17) Gerrit-Oege Schukken	2	0													2		0		0			2	12	
13	(Finland) (13) Jussi Nyronen	2				0	0							1		1					0		2	13	
14	(Switzerland) (10) Dirk Fricke	2			1			0						0			0		1				2	14	
15	(Czech Republic) (15) Lukáš Volejník	2				1			1			F						-	0				2	15	
16	(Netherlands) (2) René Stellingwerf	2	-					1				1				-				-			2	16	
17	(United Kingdom) (11) Mark Uzzell	0			0				0		0					0						0	0	17	
	(Netherlands) (18) René Verhoef	0																					0		
Placing	Rider	Total	1	2	3	4	5	6	7	8	9	10	11	12	13	14	15	16	17	18	19	20	Pts	Pos	21

m - exclusion for exceeding two minute time allowance • t - exclusion for touching the tapes • x - other exclusion • e - retired or mechanical failure • f - fell • ns - non-starter • nc - non-classify

gate A - inside	gate B	gate C	gate D - outside

== See also ==
- 2011 Team Ice Racing World Championship
- 2011 Speedway Grand Prix Qualification
