= 2010 Individual Ice Racing European Championship =

Seasons
- ← 2009 2011 →

The 2010 Individual Ice Racing European Championship is the 2010 version of UEM Individual Ice Racing European Championship season. The final will be host in Ufa, Russia on 24 January 2010. The champion title was won by Russian rider Andrey Shishegov who in semi final started as track reserve and ride in three heat only. Silver medal was won by Sergej Karachintsev, Russian also. Third placed was won by Austrian rider Harald Simon who beat Semi Final winner Jounir Bazeev after Run-Off.

== Qualifications ==
=== Semi-final ===
- January 23, 2010
- RUS Ufa
- City stadium “Stroitel” (Length: 340 m.)
- Referee and Jury President: (Germany) Frank Ziegler
- References

Pos.	Rider	Points	Details
1	(Russia) (9) Junir Bazeev	14	(3,2,3,3,3)
2	(Russia) (13) Mikhail Bogdanov	11	(3,3,M/-,2,3)
3	(Czech Republic) (8) Antonín Klatovský, Jr.	10+3	(2,3,2,Fx,3)
4	(Russia) (6) Ilya Drozdov	10+2	(3,3,2,M/-,2)
5	(Russia) (18) Andrey Shishegov	9	(3,3,3)
6	(Ukraine) (1) Nikolay Kaminskyy	9	(3,0,1,3,2)
7	(Netherlands) (5) Sven Holstein	9	(1,M/-,3,3,2)
8	(Germany) (4) Florian Fürst	8	(2,2,2,1,1)
9	(Austria) (12) Martin Leitner	8	(2,1,2,2,1)
10	(Russia) (17) Roman Akimienko	6+3	(1,3,2)
11	(Czech Republic) (7) Andrej Diviš	6+2	(0,3,0,1,2)
12	(Finland) (15) Jussi Nyronen	6+1	(2,2,1,0,1)
13	(Sweden) (10) Ulf Ledström	5	(1,2,1,1,0)
14	(Sweden) (3) Fredrik Johansson	3	(R,X,1,2,0)
15	(Norway) (14) Jo Sætre	2	(1,1,0,0,0)
16	(France) (2) Claude Gadeyne	2	(1,X,0,X,1)
17	(Switzerland) (11) Heinz Göldi	1	(0,1,T/-,M/-,M/-)
18	(Poland) (16) Michał Widera	0	(X,R,0,0,0)

(13) (United Kingdom) British place replaced by Reserve No 18 Bogdanov
(16) (Poland) Grzegorz Knapp replaced by Pole Widera
(17) (Russia) Maxim Zacharow windraw
Nominated new track reserves:

No 17 ride in Heats 5 (Holstein), 12 (Bogdanov), 16 (Drozdov)
No 18 ride in Heats 9 (Goldi), 14 (Goldi), 20 (Goldi)

== The Final ==
- January 24, 2010
- RUS Ufa
- City stadium “Stroitel” (Length: 340 m.)
- Referee: (Germany) Frank Ziegler
- Jury President: (Poland) Andrzej Grodzki
- References

Pos.	Rider	Points	Details
1	(Russia) (15) Andrey Shishegov	15	(3,3,3,3,3)
2	(Russia) (8) Sergey Karachintsev	13	(2,3,3,3,2)
3	(Austria) (10) Harald Simon	12+3	(3,3,3,2,1)
4	(Russia) (5) Junir Bazeev	12+R	(3,3,2,1,3)
5	(Russia) (6) Ilya Drozdov	10	(1,2,3,2,2)
6	(Russia) (12) Mikhail Bogdanov	8	(R,1,1,3,3)
7	(Czech Republic) (4) Antonín Klatovský, Jr.	8	(3,2,1,1,1)
8	(Ukraine) (11) Nikolay Kaminskyy	8	(2,1,1,2,2)
9	(Germany) (16) Florian Fürst	7	(1,0,0,3,3)
10	(Russia) (7) Danil Golosheikin	7	(0,2,2,2,1)
11	(Czech Republic) (1) Jan Klatovský	7	(2,2,2,1,0)
12	(Netherlands) (14) René Stellingwerf	5	(2,1,2,R,0)
13	(Netherlands) (2) Sven Holstein	3	(1,0,0,R,2)
14	(Austria) (17) Martin Leitner	2	(0,0,1,0,1)
15	(Sweden) (9) Hans Olov Olsen	2	(1,1,0,0,0)
16	(Germany) (13) Christoph Kirchner	1	(R,0,X,1,X)
—	(Russia) (17) Roman Akimienko		
—	(Czech Republic) (18) Andrej Diviš		

(3) (Finland) Kai Lehtinen replaced by track reserve

== See also ==
- 2010 Individual Ice Racing World Championship
- 2010 Individual Junior Ice Racing European Championship
- Ice speedway
