= 2017 Team Ice Racing World Championship =

Ice speedway event

Ice Speedway of Nations
- Location: Inzell, Germany
- Start date: 11 March 2017
- End date: 12 March 2017

The 2017 Team Ice Racing World Championship was the 39th edition of the Team World Championship. The final was held on 11/12 March, 2017, in Inzell, Germany.

Russia won their 15th consecutive title and 23rd title overall.

== Final Classification ==
Pos	Riders	Pts
1	(Russia) Igor Kononov 22, Dmitry Khomitsevich 16, Dmitry Koltakov 22	60
2	(Austria) Franz Zorn 29, Josef Kreuzberger 0, Charly Ebner Jr. 16	45
3	(Germany) Johann Weber 1, Max Niedermaier 12, Günther Bauer 28	41
4	(Sweden) Niklas Svensson 20, Stefan Svensson 7, Ove Ledström 12	39
5	(Czech Republic) Jan Klatovsky 16, Lukas Hutla 5, Andrej Divis 4	25
6	(Finland) Antti Aakko 8, Mats Järf 6, Tomi Tani 11	25
7	(Switzerland) Ronny Haring 6, Simon Gartmann 7, Thomas Cavigelli 1	14

== See also ==
- 2017 Individual Ice Racing World Championship
- 2017 Speedway World Cup in classic speedway
- 2017 Speedway Grand Prix in classic speedway
