= Individual Ice Speedway European Championship =

Annual motorcycle competition

Tournament information
- Sport: Ice Speedway
- Established: 1999
- Administrator: Fédération Internationale de Motocyclisme (FIM)

The Individual Ice Speedway European Championship is the European Championship for Ice speedway.

== History ==
In 2022, the leading Russian riders were banned following the Fédération Internationale de Motocyclisme restrictions imposed on Russian and Belarusian motorcycle riders, teams, officials, and competitions as a result of the 2022 Russian invasion of Ukraine.

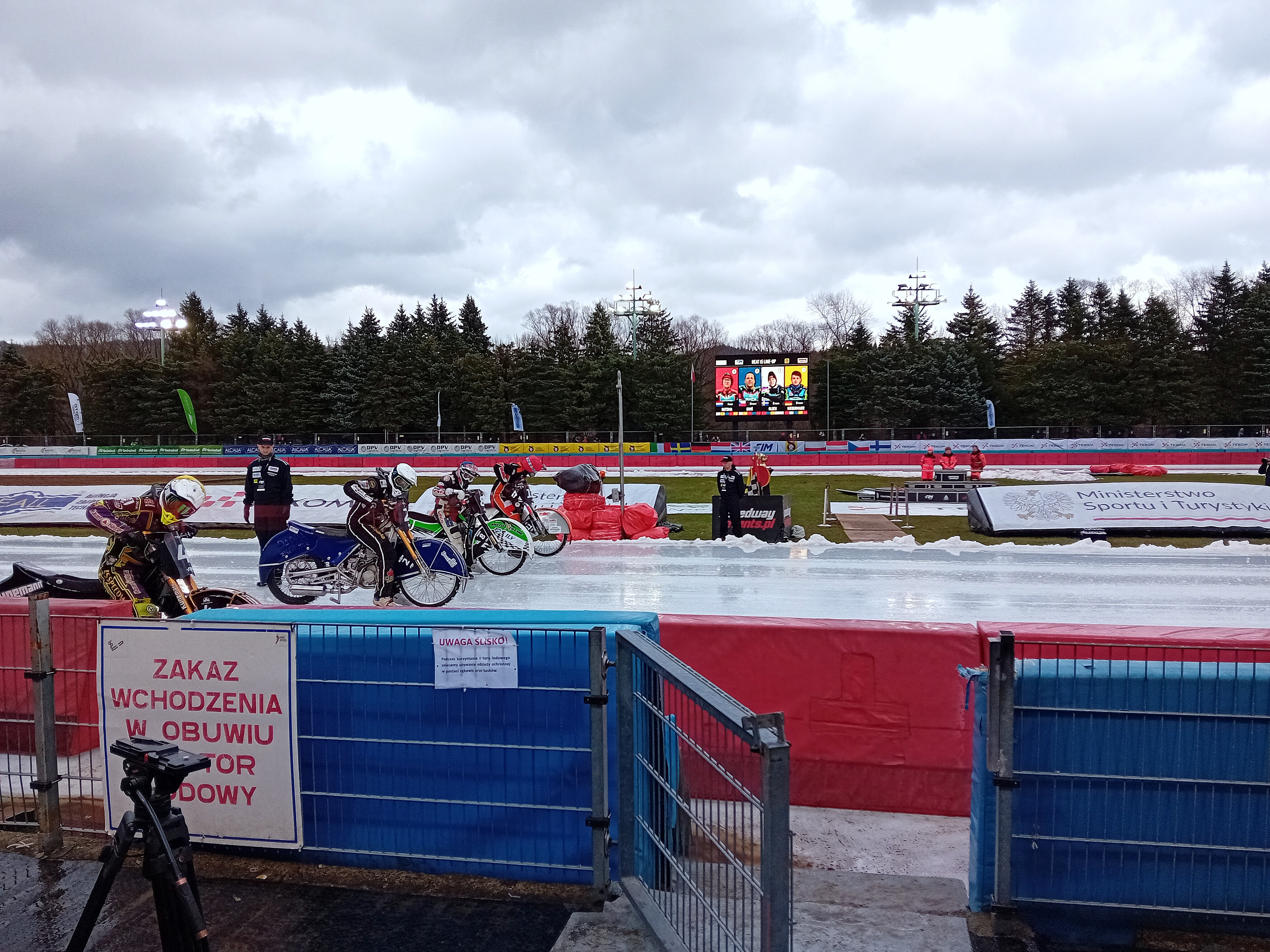
The 2024 final in Sanok, Poland

== Winner from 1999 to 2006 ==
Year	Winner
1999	(Russia) Yuri Polikarpov
2000	(Russia) Yuri Polikarpov
2001	(Russia) Vladimir Fadeev
2002	(Russia) Maxim Sachorow
2003	(Russia) Dmitry Bulankin
2004	(Russia) Dmitry Bulankin
2005	(Russia) Maxim Sachorow
2006	(Russia) Dmitry Bulankin

== Medalists since 2007 ==
Year	Venue	Winner	Runner Up	Third
2007	(Russia) Uchaly	(Russia) Dmitry Khomitsevich	(Russia) Igor Kononov	(Russia) Sergej Baltashev
2008	(Poland) Sanok	(Austria) Franz Zorn	(Russia) Roman Akimienko	(Finland) Antti Aakko
2009	(Russia) Lukhovitsy	(Russia) Dmitry Bulankin	(Russia) Igor Kononov	(Russia) Michail Bogdanovw
2010	(Russia) Ufa	(Russia) Andrey Shishegov	(Russia) Sergey Karachintsev	(Austria) Harald Simon
2011	(Russia) Tolyatti	(Russia) Yunir Baseev	(Russia) Sergey Makarov	(Russia) Edward Rats
2012	(Netherlands) Assen	(Russia) Vasily Kosov	(Austria) Harald Simon	(Russia) Artem Novikov
2013	(Russia) Ufa	(Russia) Igor Saidullin	(Russia) Nikolay Krasnikov	(Austria) Harald Simon
2014	(Russia) Kamensk-Uralsky	(Russia) Vasily Nesytyh	(Russia) Yegor Myshkovets	(Russia) Mikhail Dimitrishin
2015	(Russia) Lukhovitsy	(Russia) Sergey Karachintsev	(Russia) Nikita Toloknov	(Russia) Sergey Makarov
2016	(Russia) Ufa	(Russia) Nikolay Krasnikov	(Russia) Dmitry Solyannikov	(Austria) Harald Simon
2017	(Russia) Ufa	(Russia) Nikolay Krasnikov	(Russia) Eduard Krysov	(Russia) Dmitrii Solyannikov
2018	(Russia) Vyatskiye Polyany	(Russia) Igor Kononov	(Russia) Eduard Krysov	(Russia) Nikita Bogdanov
2019	(Russia) Ufa	(Russia) Sergey Makarov	(Russia) Ivan Chichkov	(Germany) Luca Bauer
2020	(Poland) T Mazowiecki	(Russia) Dmitrii Solyannikov	(Russia) Konstantin Kolenkin	(Russia) Nikita Toloknov
2021	(Poland) T Mazowiecki	(Russia) Nikita Bogdanov	(Sweden) Ove Ledström	(Germany) Luca Bauer
2022	(Poland) T Mazowiecki (Poland) Sanok	(Austria) Harald Simon	(Germany) Luca Bauer	(Sweden) Jimmy Olsen
2023	(Poland) Sanok	(Austria) Franz Zorn	(Germany) Luca Bauer	(Sweden) Jimmy Olsen
2024	(Poland) Sanok	(Austria) Franz Zorn	(Sweden) Jimmy Olsen	(Germany) Max Niedermaier
2025	(Poland) Sanok	(Czech Republic) Lukáš Hutla	(Germany) Luca Bauer	(Finland) Max Koivula
2026	(Finland) Varkaus	(Finland) Heikki Huusko	(Czech Republic) Lukáš Hutla	(Finland) Max Koivula

== See also ==
- Ice speedway
- Ice racing
