= 2010 Individual Ice Racing World Championship =

Seasons
- ← 2009 2011 →

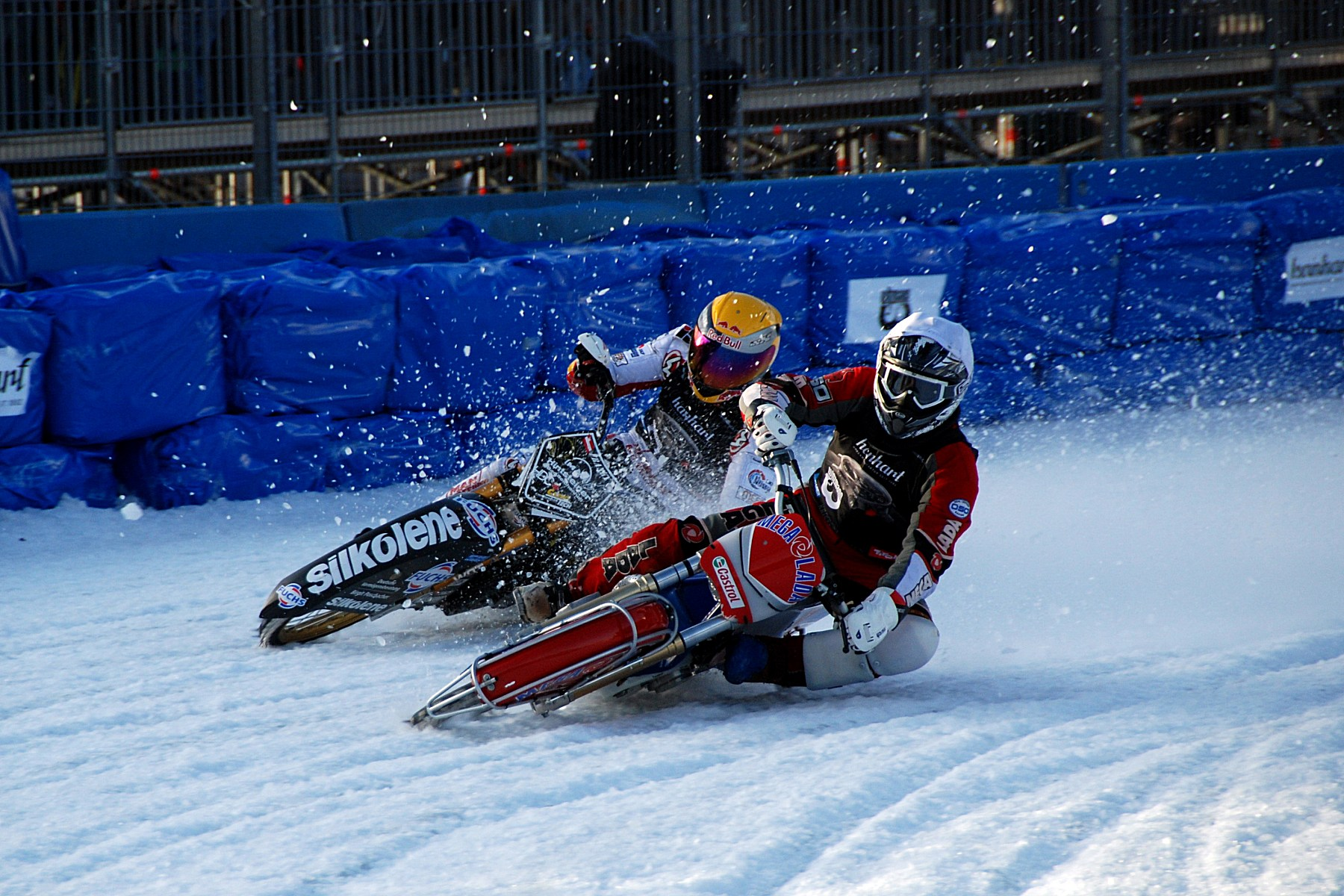
Final of the 2010 FIM Individual Ice Racing World Championship in Innsbruck

The 2010 FIM Individual Ice Racing World Championship was the 2010 version of FIM Individual Ice Racing World Championship season. The world champion was determined in nine finals in five cities between 6 February and 21 March 2010. The championship title was won by the defending champion Nikolay Krasnikov, who won seven of nine events. It was his sixth world champion title. The silver medal was won by Daniil Ivanov, who won the other two events. Dmitry Khomitsevich was third. The top five placing riders were from Russia. The first not-Russian rider was Franz Zorn from Austria.

== Qualifications ==
=== Qualifying Round One ===
- January 10, 2010
- AUT Saalfelden
- Eis-Oval Lenzing Saalfelden (Length: 367 m)
- Referee: (United Kingdom) Anthony Steele
- Jury President: (Finland) Ilkka Teromaa
- References

Pos.	Rider	Points	Details
1	(Russia) (13) Vitaly Khomitsevich	13+3	(3,3,3,1,3)
2	(Germany) (11) Günther Bauer	13+2	(3,3,2,2,3)
3	(Finland) (6) Antti Aakko	13+1	(3,2,3,3,2)
4	(Russia) (2) Dmitry Khomitsevich	12	(Fx,3,3,3,3)
5	(Sweden) (4) Per-Anders Lindström	10+3	(3,3,2,2,Fx)
6	(Austria) (5) Harald Simon	10+2	(2,2,2,3,1)
7	(Netherlands) (14) Sven Holstein	10+1	(2,0,3,3,2)
8	(Austria) (10) Mario Schwaiger	8	(1,1,1,2,3)
9	(Czech Republic) (15) Jan Pecina	6	(1,2,1,0,2)
10	(Germany) (16) Christoph Kirchner	6	(0,2,1,1,2)
11	(Sweden) (9) Peter Koij	6	(2,Fx,2,1,1)
12	(Netherlands) (1) René Verhoef	4	(2,1,0,1,R)
13	(Norway) (8) Jo Sætre	3	(0,1,1,0,1)
14	(Germany) (18) Johann Weber	2	(2)
15	(Czech Republic) (3) Lukáš Volejník	2	(1,Fx,0,0,1)
16	(Ukraine) (7) Oleg Dosaev	2	(1,1,-,-,-)
17	(Norway) (12) Ketil Skarponord	0	(0,0,0,0,0)
18	(Sweden) (17) Robert Henderson	0	(0,0)

=== Qualifying Round Three ===
- January 16, 2010
- AUT Sankt Johann im Pongau
- Speedwaystadion (Length: 380 m)
- Referee: (Russia) Andrey Savin
- Jury President: (Germany) Wolfgang Glas
- References

Pos.	Rider	Points	Details
1	(Russia) (16) Pavel Chayka	14+3	(3,2,3,3,3)
2	(Russia) (13) Igor Kononov	14+N	(2,3,3,3,3)
3	(Austria) (4) Franz Zorn	13	(3,3,1,3,3)
4	(Ukraine) (2) Nikolay Kaminskyy	11	(1,3,3,2,2)
5	(Czech Republic) (1) Jan Klatovský	10+3	(2,X,2,3,3)
6	(Sweden) (9) Per-Olof Serenius	10+2	(3,2,2,2,1)
7	(Germany) (3) Florian Fürst	10+1	(0,3,2,3,2)
8	(Russia) (10) Dmitry Bulankin	9	(2,2,2,1,2)
9	(Germany) (5) Stefan Pletschacher	7	(3,R,2,0,2)
10	(Sweden) (7) Hans-Olov Olsén	6	(2,2,0,2,0)
11	(Austria) (17) Karl Ebner	5	(1,1,1,1,1)
12	(Finland) (8) Kai Lehtinen	3	(1,1,0,1,0)
13	(Finland) (14) Mats Järf	3	(-,1,1,X,1)
14	(Switzerland) (6) Simon Gartmann	2	(0,0,1,0,1)
15	(France) (12) Claude Gadeyne	1	(1,0,0,0,0)
16	(Austria) (18) Johann Bruckner	1	(1)
17	(United Kingdom) (11) Mark Uzzell	0	(0,X,0,0,0)
18	(Austria) (15) Martin Posch	0	(X,-,-,-,-)

=== Qualifying Round Two ===
- January 16, 2010
- POL Sanok
- Stadion "Błonie" (Length: 400m)
- Referee: (Germany) Frank Ziegler
- Jury President: (Hungary) Janos Nadasdi
- References

Pos.	Rider	Points	Details
1	(Russia) (5) Ivan Ivanov	14+3	(3,3,3,2,3)
2	(Russia) (10) Nikolay Krasnikov	14+2	(3,3,3,3,2)
3	(Russia) (15) Daniil Ivanov	14+1	(3,3,2,3,3)
4	(Sweden) (8) Stefan Svensson	12	(2,3,3,3,1)
5	(Czech Republic) (4) Antonín Klatovský, Jr.	10+3	(3,2,2,2,1)
6	(Poland) (14) Grzegorz Knapp	10+2	(2,1,2,3,2)
7	(Netherlands) (2) René Stellingwerf	10+1	(2,2,1,2,3)
8	(Germany) (13) Max Niedermaier	8	(1,2,1,1,3)
9	(Austria) (9) Martin Leitner	6	(T/-,2,1,1,2)
10	(Finland) (7) Henri Malinen	6	(1,1,0,2,2)
11	(Sweden) (11) Fredrik Johansson	5	(2,F,3,0,Fx)
12	(Austria) (3) Josef Kreuzberger	4	(1,1,0,1,1)
13	(Czech Republic) (16) Andrej Diviš	3	(0,1,2,F,R)
14	(Switzerland) (1) Heinz Göldi	2	(1,0,1,0,0)
15	(Poland) (6) Michał Widera	1	(0,T/-,0,0,1)
16	(Finland) (12) Jouni Seppänen	0	(0,0,0,1,F)
17	(Poland) (17) Mirosław Daniszewski	0	(0)
18	(Poland) (18) Piotr Hejnowski	0	(0)

(6) Marcin Sekula → Michał Widera
(17) Tomasz Kopik → Mirosław Daniszewski

== Riders ==
After each Final, the two reserve riders become scheduled riders in the next Final, even if they have taken part in the Final where they are reserve riders. Therefore, the two lowest point scoring riders (not being the two reserve riders from that Final) on the Intermediate FIM Ice Racing World Championship Classification will become reserve riders in the next Final. The best placed rider will be the first reserve rider with draw number seventeen, and the second rider will be the second reserve with draw number eighteen.

== Grand Prix ==
=== Final One ===
- February 6–7, 2010
- RUS Tolyatti, Samara Oblast
- ”STROITEL” Stadium (Length: 260 m)
- Referee: (Poland) Wojciech Grodzki
- Jury President: (Sweden) C. Bergstrøm
- References

Pos.	Rider	GP Pts.	Details	Pts.	Pos.	Final heat
1	(Russia) (13) Nikolay Krasnikov	25	(3,3,3,3,3)	15	1	3
2	(Russia) (14) Daniil Ivanov	20	(2,1,3,3,3)	12	2	2
3	(Russia) (9) Dmitry Khomitsevich	18	(3,1,2,3,3)	12	3	1
4	(Austria) (5) Franz Zorn	16	(3,0,3,2,2)	10	4	0
5	(Sweden) (2) Stefan Svensson	14	(2,3,1,2,2)	10	6	3
6	(Finland) (10) Antti Aakko	13	(1,2,2,0,3)	8	8	2
7	(Russia) (1) Igor Kononov	12	(3,2,3,2,Fx)	10	5	1
8	(Russia) (16) Ivan Ivanov	11	(1,3,Fx,3,1)	8	7	0
9	(Russia) (8) Pavel Chayka	10	(1,1,1,2,2)	7	11	3
10	(Germany) (7) Günther Bauer	9	(2,2,0,X,0)	4	12	2
11	(Russia) (4) Vitaly Khomitsevich	8	(1,2,1,2,1)	7	10	1
12	(Ukraine) (11) Nikolay Kaminskyy	7	(2,3,2,0,0)	7	9	0
13	(Czech Republic) (3) Antonín Klatovský, Jr.	6	(0,1,0,1,2)	4	13	3
14	(Czech Republic) (15) Jan Klatovský	5	(0,0,0,1,1)	2	15	2
15	(Sweden) (12) Per-Anders Lindström	4	(0,Fx,1,1,1)	3	14	1
16	(Netherlands) (6) Sven Holstein	3	(R,1,0,0,0)	1	16	0
17	(Poland) (17) Grzegorz Knapp	—	—	—	—	—
18	(Austria) (18) Harald Simon	—	—	—	—	—

Pos.	Rider	GP Pts.	Details	Pts.	Pos.	Final heat
1	(Russia) (13) Nikolay Krasnikov	25	(3,3,3,3,3)	15	1	3
2	(Russia) (14) Daniil Ivanov	20	(1,3,2,3,3)	12	3	2
3	(Russia) (1) Igor Kononov	18	(2,3,3,3,3)	14	2	1
4	(Russia) (9) Dmitry Khomitsevich	16	(3,2,3,2,2)	12	4	0
5	(Russia) (4) Vitaly Khomitsevich	14	(3,1,2,3,2)	11	5	3
6	(Finland) (10) Antti Aakko	13	(2,2,2,2,0)	8	7	2
7	(Sweden) (2) Stefan Svensson	12	(0,3,0,2,3)	8	6	1
8	(Ukraine) (11) Nikolay Kaminskyy	11	(2,1,2,1,1)	8	8	X
9	(Russia) (8) Pavel Chayka	10	(1,1,3,X,X)	5	11	3
10	(Germany) (7) Günther Bauer	9	(1,2,1,1,1)	6	9	2
11	(Poland) (12) Grzegorz Knapp	8	(2,0,1,2,0)	5	12	1
12	(Austria) (6) Harald Simon	7	(3,Fx,1,X,1)	5	10	0
13	(Austria) (5) Franz Zorn	6	(R,2,0,1,2)	5	13	3
14	(Czech Republic) (3) Antonín Klatovský, Jr.	5	(0,0,1,0,1)	2	14	2
15	(Czech Republic) (15) Jan Klatovský	4	(1,0,0,1,0)	2	15	1
16	(Russia) (16) Ivan Ivanov	3	(0,1,0,R,1)	2	16	0
17	(Sweden) (17) Per-Anders Lindström	—	—	—	—	—
18	(Netherlands) (18) Sven Holstein	—	—	—	—	—

=== Final Two ===
- February 13–14, 2010
- RUS Saransk, Republic of Mordovia
- ”Svetotechnika” Stadium (Length: 360 m)
- Referee: (United Kingdom) Anthony Steele
- Jury President: (Poland) Andrzej Grodzki
- References

Pos.	Rider	GP Pts.	Details	Pts.	Pos.	Final heat
1	(Russia) (5) Daniil Ivanov	25	(2,2,3,3,2)	12	3	3
2	(Russia) (15) Igor Kononov	20	(3,3,2,2,2)	12	4	2
3	(Russia) (14) Dmitry Khomitsevich	18	(1,3,2,3,3)	12	2	1
4	(Russia) (8) Nikolay Krasnikov	16	(3,3,3,3,3)	15	1	Fx
5	(Russia) (4) Vitaly Khomitsevich	14	(3,2,2,3,1)	11	5	3
6	(Austria) (7) Franz Zorn	13	(1,2,1,2,2)	8	7	2
7	(Germany) (10) Günther Bauer	12	(3,2,0,1,1)	7	8	1
8	(Ukraine) (13) Nikolay Kaminskyy	11	(2,3,3,2,Fx)	10	6	Fx
9	(Russia) (3) Pavel Chayka	10	(1,0,1,2,3)	7	11	3
10	(Sweden) (11) Stefan Svensson	9	(2,1,3,1,0)	7	9	2
11	(Finland) (2) Antti Aakko	8	(2,1,1,0,3)	7	10	1
12	(Russia) (6) Ivan Ivanov	7	(0,0,2,1,2,)	5	12	0
13	(Netherlands) (16) Sven Holstein	6	(0,0,1,0,0)	1	15	3
14	(Sweden) (9) Per-Anders Lindström	5	(1,1,R,0,1)	3	14	2
15	(Czech Republic) (1) Jan Klatovský	4	(0,0,0,0,0)	0	16	1
16	(Czech Republic) (12) Antonín Klatovský, Jr.	3	(0,1,0,1,1)	3	13	0
17	(Poland) (17) Grzegorz Knapp	—	—	—	—	—
18	(Austria) (18) Harald Simon	—	—	—	—	—

Pos.	Rider	GP Pts.	Details	Pts.	Pos.	Final heat
1	(Russia) (8) Nikolay Krasnikov	25	(3,3,3,2,3)	14	1	3
2	(Russia) (4) Vitaly Khomitsevich	20	(2,1,3,3,3)	12	3	2
3	(Russia) (5) Daniil Ivanov	18	(3,2,2,3,2)	12	4	1
4	(Russia) (15) Igor Kononov	16	(3,3,1,3,3)	13	2	0
5	(Russia) (14) Dmitry Khomitsevich	14	(3,2,2,2,3)	12	5	3
6	(Russia) (3) Pavel Chayka	13	(0,3,3,3,1)	10	6	2
7	(Germany) (10) Günther Bauer	12	(1,1,3,1,1)	7	8	1
8	(Austria) (7) Franz Zorn	11	(2,3,0,0,2)	7	7	R
9	(Sweden) (11) Stefan Svensson	10	(0,0,2,1,2)	5	11	3
10	(Austria) (9) Harald Simon	9	(1,0,1,2,2)	6	10	2
11	(Finland) (2) Antti Aakko	8	(1,2,2,0,0)	5	12	1
12	(Ukraine) (13) Nikolay Kaminskyy	7	(2,2,1,2,Fx)	7	9	0
13	(Poland) (16) Grzegorz Knapp	6	(1,0,1,0,1)	3	14	3
14	(Czech Republic) (1) Jan Klatovský	5	(0,0,0,1,0)	1	16	2
15	(Czech Republic) (12) Antonín Klatovský, Jr.	4	(0,1,0,1,1)	3	15	1
16	(Russia) (6) Ivan Ivanov	3	(2,1,0,Fx,-)	3	13	N
17	(Netherlands) (17) Sven Holstein	0	(0)	0	17	—
18	(Sweden) (18) Per-Anders Lindström	—	—	—	—	—

=== Final Three (only one event) ===
- February 21, 2010
- AUT Innsbruck, Tyrol
- Olympiaworld (Length: 400 m)
- Referee: (Sweden) Krister Gardell
- Jury President: (Hungary) Janos Nadasi
- References

This meeting was scheduled to take place on February 20 and 21. However, the meeting was delayed because of poor track conditions. The first day's program (heat 1 to 20 and four final heats) was held on Sunday.

Pos.	Rider	GP Pts.	Details	Pts.	Pos.	Final heat
1	(Russia) (7) Nikolay Krasnikov	25	(3,3,3,3,3)	15	1	3
2	(Russia) (3) Dmitry Khomitsevich	20	(3,1,3,3,3)	13	2	2
3	(Russia) (15) Daniil Ivanov	18	(3,2,3,1,3)	12	3	1
4	(Austria) (4) Franz Zorn	16	(2,2,2,3,2)	11	4	0
5	(Russia) (11) Vitaly Khomitsevich	14	(1,0,3,3,3)	10	5	3
6	(Russia) (12) Igor Kononov	13	(3,3,2,2,Fx)	10	6	2
7	(Russia) (9) Pavel Chayka	12	(2,3,1,2,2)	10	7	1
8	(Germany) (14) Günther Bauer	11	(2,3,2,X,0)	7	8	0
9	(Finland) (5) Antti Aakko	10	(1,1,0,2,1)	5	11	3
10	(Russia) (2) Ivan Ivanov	9	(1,2,1,1,1)	6	10	2
11	(Netherlands) (6) Sven Holstein	8	(0,1,1,0,2)	4	12	1
12	(Sweden) (8) Stefan Svensson	7	(2,0,0,2,2)	6	9	X
13	(Ukraine) (16) Nikolay Kaminskyy	6	(1,1,2,Fx,0)	4	13	3
14	(Czech Republic) (10) Antonín Klatovský, Jr.	5	(0,0,1,1,1)	3	15	2
15	(Austria) (17) Harald Simon	4	(2,1)	3	14	1
16	(Czech Republic) (13) Jan Klatovský	3	(Fx,0,F,0,1)	1	16	Fx
17	(Poland) (18) Grzegorz Knapp	0	(0,0)	0	17	—
18	(Sweden) (1) Per-Anders Lindström	0	(Fx,-,-,-,-)	0	18	—

Rider #17 – in heats 5 and 13
Rider #18 – in heats 9 and 17

=== Final Four ===
- March 13–14, 2010
- NED Assen, Drenthe
- De Bonte Wever (Length: 370 m)
- Referee: (Poland) Wojciech Grodzki
- Jury President: (Sweden) Christer Bergström
- References

Pos.	Rider	GP Pts.	Details	Pts.	Pos.	Final heat
1	(Russia) (8) Nikolay Krasnikov	25	(3,3,3,2,3)	14	2	3
2	(Russia) (13) Daniil Ivanov	20	(3,3,3,3,3)	15	1	2
3	(Russia) (2) Igor Kononov	18	(3,3,2,1,3)	12	3	1
4	(Russia) (12) Dmitry Khomitsevich	16	(3,2,3,3,Fx)	11	4	0
5	(Russia) (4) Vitaly Khomitsevich	14	(2,1,2,3,3)	11	5	3
6	(Finland) (10) Antti Aakko	13	(2,2,0,2,2)	8	7	2
7	(Austria) (3) Franz Zorn	12	(1,3,2,3,2)	11	6	1
8	(Russia) (15) Ivan Ivanov	11	(2,2,0,2,1)	7	8	0
9	(Sweden) (7) Stefan Svensson	10	(Fx,1,1,2,2)	6	10	3
10	(Ukraine) (11) Nikolay Kaminskyy	9	(0,0,3,F,1)	4	12	2
11	(Poland) (5) Grzegorz Knapp	8	(1,2,1,1,2)	7	9	1
12	(Germany) (6) Günther Bauer	7	(2,1,1,0,1)	5	11	0
13	(Russia) (16) Pavel Chayka	6	(1,0,2,0,1)	4	13	3
14	(Austria) (9) Harald Simon	5	(1,Fx,1,1,0)	3	14	2
15	(Czech Republic) (1) Antonín Klatovský, Jr.	4	(0,1,0,1,0)	2	15	1
16	(Netherlands) (14) Sven Holstein	3	(0,0,0,0,0)	0	16	0
17	(Czech Republic) (17) Jan Klatovský	—	—	—	—	—
18	(Sweden) (18) Per-Anders Lindström	—	—	—	—	—

Pos.	Rider	GP Pts.	Details	Pts.	Pos.	Final heat
1	(Russia) (8) Nikolay Krasnikov	25	(2,3,3,3,3)	14	1	3
2	(Russia) (13) Daniil Ivanov	20	(2,3,3,3,2)	13	2	2
3	(Russia) (2) Igor Kononov	18	(3,3,2,2,3)	13	3	1
4	(Austria) (3) Franz Zorn	16	(3,3,3,2,2)	13	4	R
5	(Russia) (12) Dmitry Khomitsevich	14	(3,2,3,1,3)	12	5	3
6	(Sweden) (7) Stefan Svensson	13	(2,1,2,0,2)	7	8	2
7	(Germany) (6) Günther Bauer	12	(0,2,1,3,2)	8	7	1
8	(Russia) (4) Vitaly Khomitsevich	11	(2,2,2,F,3)	9	6	0
9	(Czech Republic) (1) Antonín Klatovský, Jr.	10	(1,0,1,1,1)	4	12	3
10	(Ukraine) (11) Nikolay Kaminskyy	9	(3,0,F,1,1)	5	11	2
11	(Finland) (10) Antti Aakko	8	(1,1,1,3,Fx)	6	10	1
12	(Russia) (15) Ivan Ivanov	7	(1,2,1,2,1)	7	9	0
13	(Russia) (16) Pavel Chayka	6	(0,0,2,R,1)	3	14	3
14	(Austria) (17) Harald Simon	5	(1,1)	2	15	2
15	(Czech Republic) (9) Jan Klatovský	4	(1,0,0,0,0)	1	16	1
16	(Netherlands) (14) Sven Holstein	3	(0,1,0,2,Fx)	3	13	F
17	(Poland) (18) Grzegorz Knapp	0	(0,0)	0	17	—
18	(Sweden) (5) Per-Anders Lindström	0	(Fx,-,-,-,-)	0	18	—

Rider #17 – in heats 27 and 36
Rider #18 – in heats 30 and 40

=== Final Five ===
- March 20–21, 2010
- GER Wilmersdorf, Berlin
- Horst-Dohm-Eisstadion (Length: 386m)
- Referee: (Hungary) Istvan Darago
- Jury President: (Denmark) Jörgen Jensen
- References
- Changes:

(Netherlands) Sven Holstein → (Netherlands) René Stellingwerf

Pos.	Rider	GP Pts.	Details	Pts.	Pos.	Final heat
1	(Russia) (3) Nikolay Krasnikov	25	(3,3,2,3,3)	14	1	3
2	(Russia) (16) Dmitry Khomitsevich	20	(3,2,3,2,2)	12	4	2
3	(Russia) (9) Daniil Ivanov	18	(3,3,3,3,1)	13	2	1
4	(Austria) (4) Franz Zorn	16	(2,3,3,2,2)	12	3	0
5	(Russia) (14) Igor Kononov	14	(2,3,0,2,3)	10	5	3
6	(Sweden) (7) Stefan Svensson	13	(2,X,2,1,3)	8	8	2
7	(Finland) (12) Antti Aakko	12	(1,0,3,3,2)	9	7	1
8	(Russia) (11) Vitaly Khomitsevich	11	(2,2,2,3,1)	10	6	0
9	(Germany) (2) Günther Bauer	10	(1,2,1,2,0)	6	6	3
10	(Austria) (15) Harald Simon	9	(1,1,2,1,1)	6	10	2
11	(Poland) (10) Grzegorz Knapp	8	(0,0,1,1,3)	5	11	1
12	(Russia) (8) Ivan Ivanov	7	(3,1,1,u/-,-)	5	12	N
13	(Czech Republic) (1) Antonín Klatovský, Jr.	6	(0,2,0,0,2)	4	13	3
14	(Ukraine) (6) Nikolay Kaminskyy	5	(1,1,1,0,1)	4	14	2
15	(Czech Republic) (5) Jan Klatovský	4	(0,0,0,0,0)	0	16	1
16	(Sweden) (17) Per-Anders Lindström	3	(1,F,R)	1	15	0
17	(Netherlands) (18) René Stellingwerf	0	(Fx,Fx,0)	0	17	—
18	(Russia) (13) Pavel Chayka	0	(Fx,-,-,-,-)	0	18	—

Pos.	Rider	GP Pts.	Details	Pts.	Pos.	Final heat
1	(Russia) (9) Daniil Ivanov	25	(3,3,3,3,2)	14	1	3
2	(Russia) (3) Nikolay Krasnikov	20	(3,1,2,3,3)	12	4	2
3	(Russia) (14) Igor Kononov	18	(3,2,3,3,2)	13	2	1
4	(Russia) (16) Dmitry Khomitsevich	16	(2,3,3,2,3)	13	3	0
5	(Russia) (11) Vitaly Khomitsevich	14	(1,3,1,3,3)	11	6	3
6	(Austria) (4) Franz Zorn	13	(3,0,3,2,3)	11	5	2
7	(Sweden) (7) Stefan Svensson	12	(2,2,2,2,2)	10	7	1
8	(Germany) (2) Günther Bauer	11	(2,1,2,1,2)	8	8	0
9	(Ukraine) (6) Nikolay Kaminskyy	10	(1,0,2,2,1)	6	9	3
10	(Finland) (12) Antti Aakko	9	(0,3,1,1,0)	5	11	2
11	(Austria) (15) Harald Simon	8	(1,2,1,1,1)	6	10	1
12	(Netherlands) (5) René Stellingwerf	7	(0,2,0,1,0)	3	12	0
13	(Poland) (13) Grzegorz Knapp	6	(T/-,1,1,0,1)	3	13	3
14	(Czech Republic) (17) Jan Klatovský	5	(1,1,0,0,0)	2	15	2
15	(Russia) (8) Ivan Ivanov	3.5	(2,-,-,-,-)	2	14	N
16	(Sweden) (10) Per-Anders Lindström	3.5	(0,0,Fx,-,-,)	0	16	N
17	(Czech Republic) (1) Antonín Klatovský, Jr.	0	(0,-,-,-,-)	0	17	—

(Russia) (13) Pavel Chayka replaced by 1st track reserve, Knapp

== Classification ==
In case of one or more ties on the Intermediate Classification of the Championship, the following will apply:

1. Best place in the last Final run.

In case of riders involved in a tie on the Final Overall Classification at the end of the Championship, the following will apply:

1. Run-off for 1st, 2nd and 3rd place.
2. Best place in the last Final meeting.

Pos.	Rider	Points	(Russia)	(Russia)	(Russia)	(Russia)	(Austria)	(Austria)	(Netherlands)	(Netherlands)	(Germany)	(Germany)
Gold	(Russia) Nikolay Krasnikov	211	25	25	16	25	25	–	25	25	25	20
Silver	(Russia) Daniil Ivanov	184	20	20	25	18	18	–	20	20	18	25
Bronze	(Russia) Dmitry Khomitsevich	152	18	16	18	14	20	–	16	14	20	16
4	(Russia) Igor Kononov	147	12	18	20	16	13	–	18	18	14	18
5	(Russia) Vitaly Khomitsevich	120	8	14	14	20	14	–	14	11	11	14
6	(Austria) Franz Zorn	119	16	6	13	11	16	–	12	16	16	13
7	(Sweden) Stefan Svensson	100	14	12	9	10	7	–	10	13	13	12
8	(Finland) Antti Aakko	94	13	13	8	8	10	–	13	8	12	9
9	(Germany) Günther Bauer	93	9	9	12	12	11	–	7	12	10	11
10	(Ukraine) Nikolay Kaminskyy	75	7	11	11	7	6	–	9	9	5	10
11	(Russia) Pavel Chayka	67	10	10	10	13	12	–	6	6	0	–
12	(Russia) Ivan Ivanov	61.5	11	3	7	3	9	–	11	7	7	3.5
13	(Austria) Harald Simon	47	ns	7	ns	9	4	–	5	5	9	8
14	(Czech Republic) Antonín Klatovský, Jr.	43	6	5	3	4	5	–	4	10	6	0
15	(Poland) Grzegorz Knapp	36	ns	8	ns	6	0	–	8	0	8	6
16	(Czech Republic) Jan Klatovský	34	5	4	4	5	3	–	ns	4	4	5
17	(Netherlands) Sven Holstein	23	3	ns	6	0	8	–	3	3	–	–
18	(Sweden) Per-Anders Lindström	15.5	4	ns	5	ns	0	–	ns	0	3	3.5
19	(Netherlands) René Stellingwerf	7	–	–	–	–	–	–	–	–	0	7

== See also ==
- 2010 Team Ice Racing World Championship
- 2010 Speedway Grand Prix in classic speedway
