= Anatoly Stepanov Stadium =

Stadium in Tolyatti, Russia

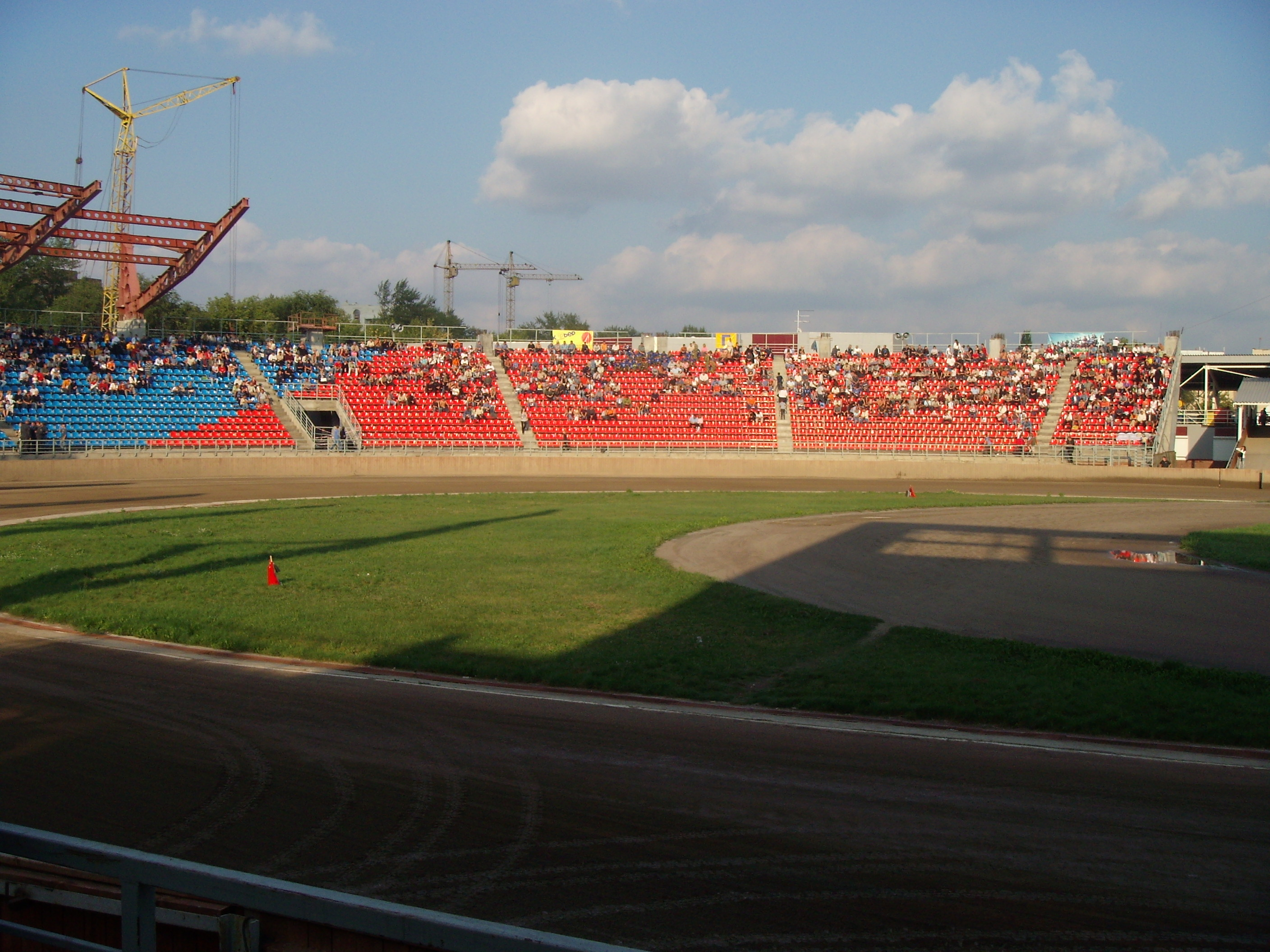
- Speedway track
- Location: Ulitsa Rodiny, 40, Tolyatti, Samara Oblast, Russia 445020
- Coordinates: 53°30′00″N 49°23′26″E
- Capacity: 15,000
- Owner: Mega-Lada Togliatti
- Opened: 1963; 62 years ago
- Former names: Stroitel Stadium
- Major events: Motorcycle speedway Ice speedway
- Length: 353 m (0.219 mi)

The Anatoly Stepanov Stadium, (Note: Russian: Спортивно-технический комплекс имени Анатолия Степанова, romanized: Sportivno-tekhnicheskiy kompleks imeni Anatoliya Stepanova, lit. 'Sports and Technical Complex Anatoly Stepanov'.) formerly the Stroitel Stadium, (Note: стадион Строитель, stadion Stroitel'.) is a 15,000-capacity motorcycle speedway and ice speedway in Tolyatti, Russia. It is the home track of the Russian speedway team called the Mega-Lada Togliatti.

== History ==
The stadium opened in 1963.

In 2019, the stadium hosted the 2019 Speedway of Nations (the World Cup of speedway). In 2021, the stadium hosted the Speedway World Championship round known as the Speedway Grand Prix of Russia in 2021 and was due to be a regular venue until the 2022 Russian invasion of Ukraine. The speedway track has a circumference of 353 metres.

Since 2022, the stadium has been restricted to domestic use following the Fédération Internationale de Motocyclisme ban on Russian motorcycle riders, teams, officials, and competitions, as a result of the invasion of Ukraine.

== Name ==
The stadium is named after the deputy of the Duma of Samara Oblast and president of the sports club Mega-Lada Anatoly Alexeyevich Stepanov, who was murdered in 2009.

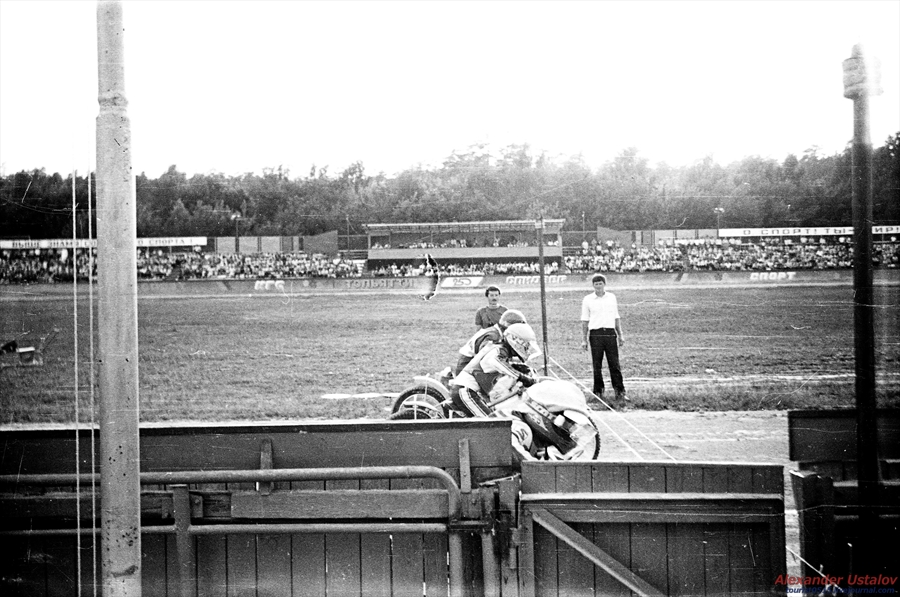
Riders preparing for race in 1986

== Mega-Lada Togliatti ==
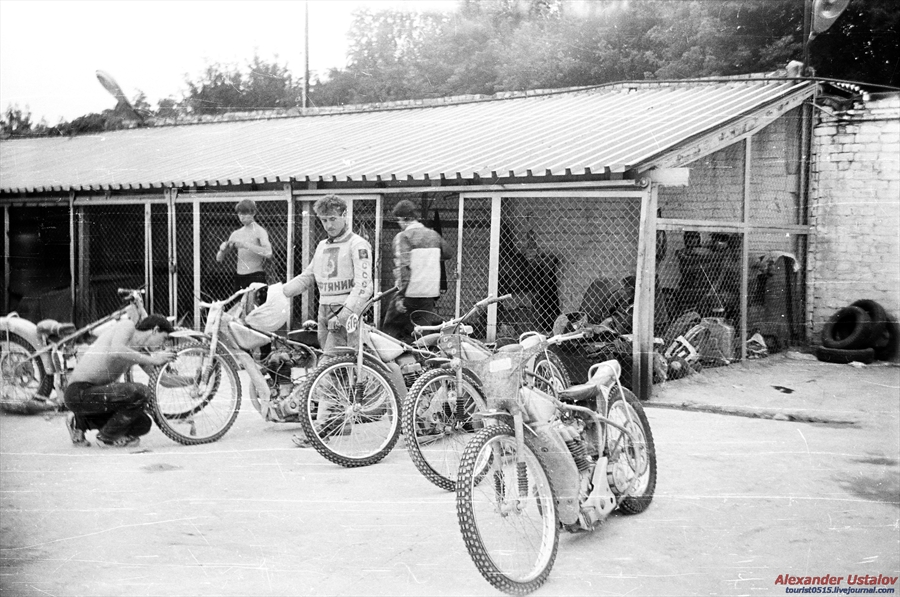
The speedway pits at the stadium in 1986

The speedway team Mega-Lada Togliatti competed in the European Speedway Club Champions' Cup from 1999 and from 2002 until 2008. They won the event a record four times. They also hold the record number of wins for the Russian Team Speedway Championship.

== See also ==
- Speedway Grand Prix of Russia
