= Igor Kononov =

Russian ice speedway world champion (born 1987)

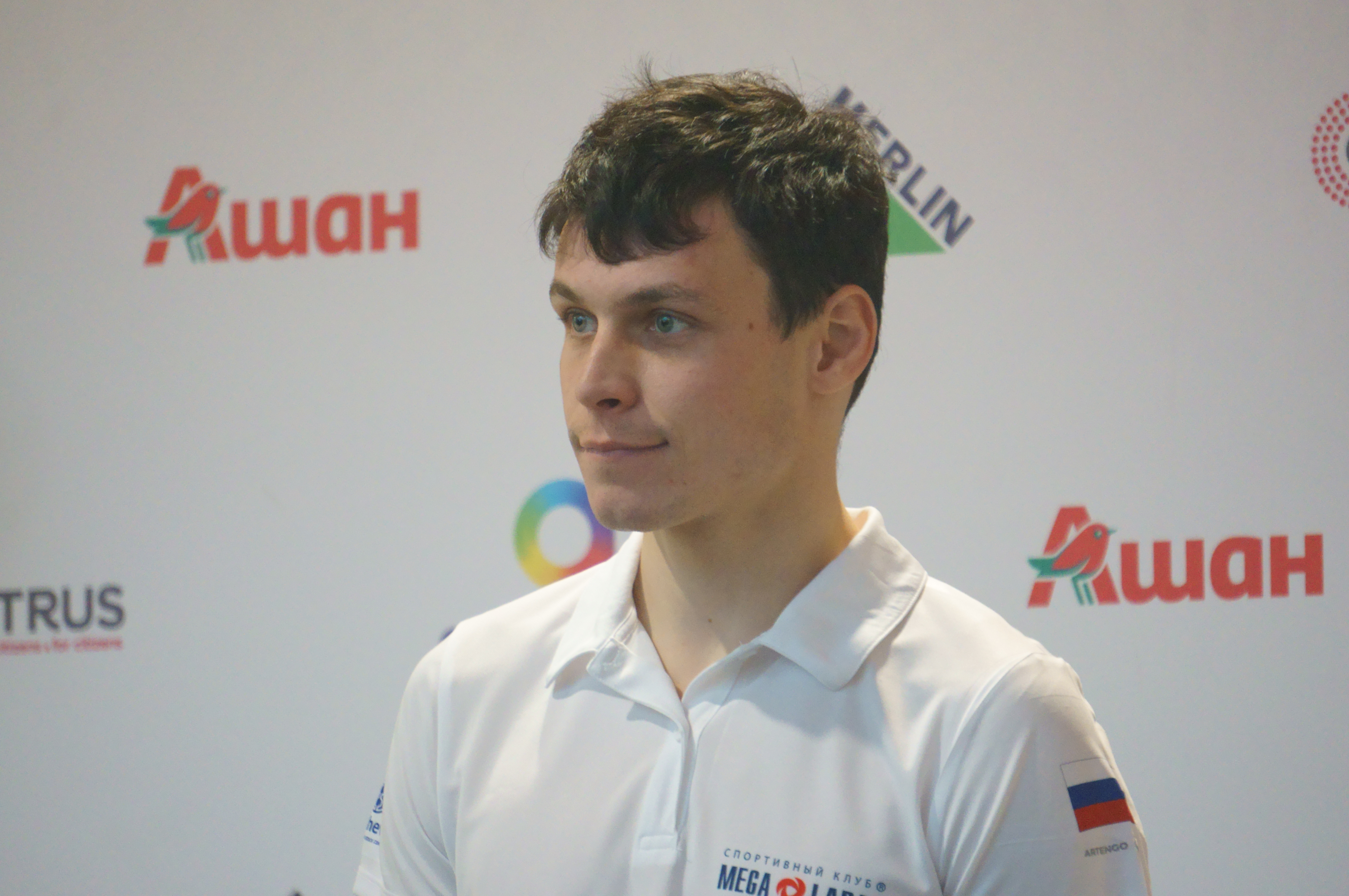
- Portrait of Igor Kononov
- Born: April 26, 1987 (age 39); Russia
- Nationality: Russian

Career history

Russia
- 2005, 2008, 2010, 2014: Salavat
- 2006–2007, 2011–2012, 2018–2019: Oktyabrsky
- 2020: Togliatti

Individual honours

Team honours
- 2017, 2020: World Team Champion

Igor Alexandrovich Kononov is a Russian ice speedway world champion.

== Career ==
On three occasions, Kononov has finished runner-up in the Individual Ice Speedway World Championship title in 2011, 2017 and 2021. During the 2021 Championship, he was in the lead on the last lap of the race-off with Dinar Valeev. but hit a rut approaching the last two bends, which allowed Valeev to overtake and claim the title for himself.

Kononov is a two-time team world champion after winning the Team Ice Racing World Championship title with Russia in 2017 and 2020.
