= Bydgoszcz =

City in Kuyavian-Pomeranian, Poland

- City county
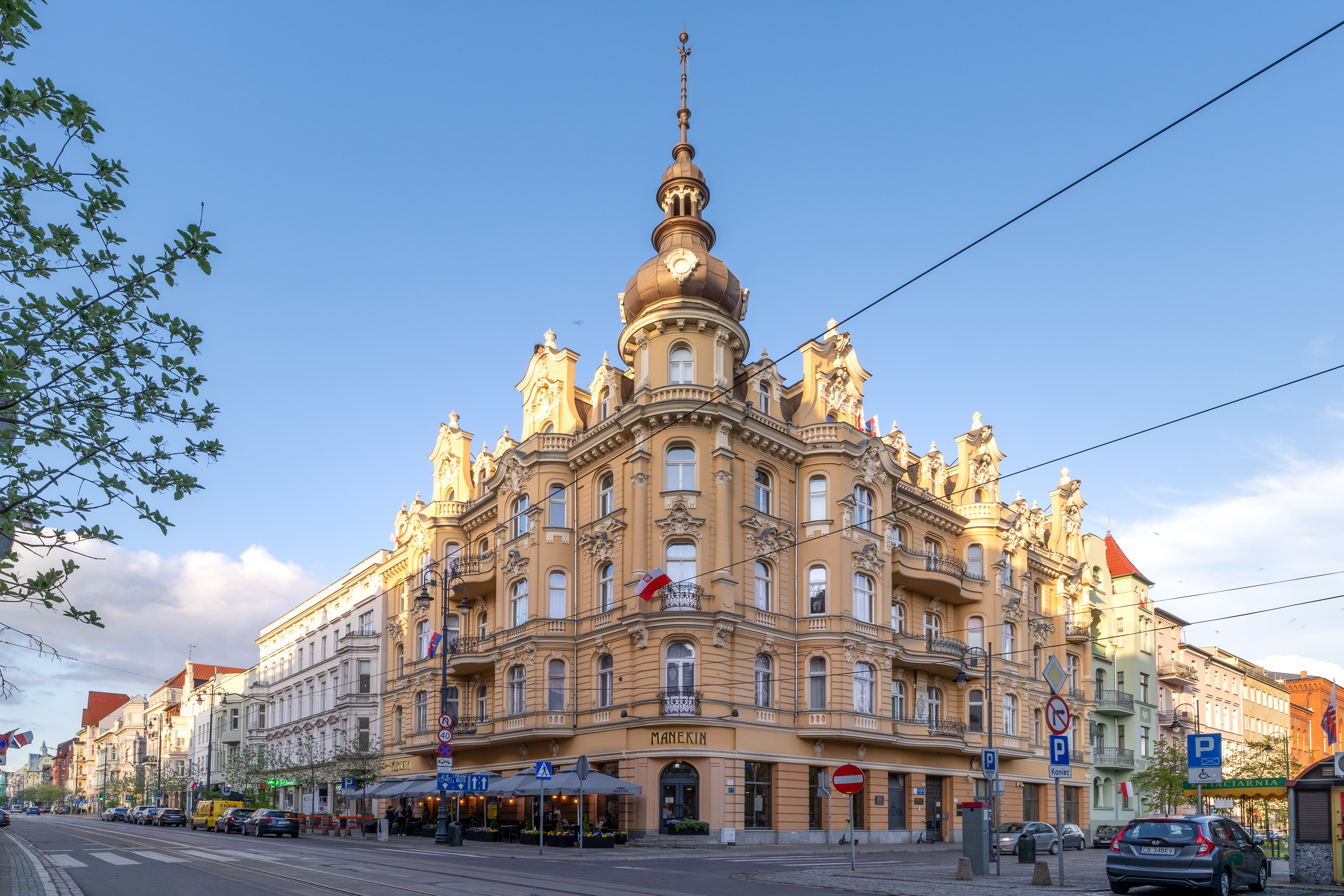
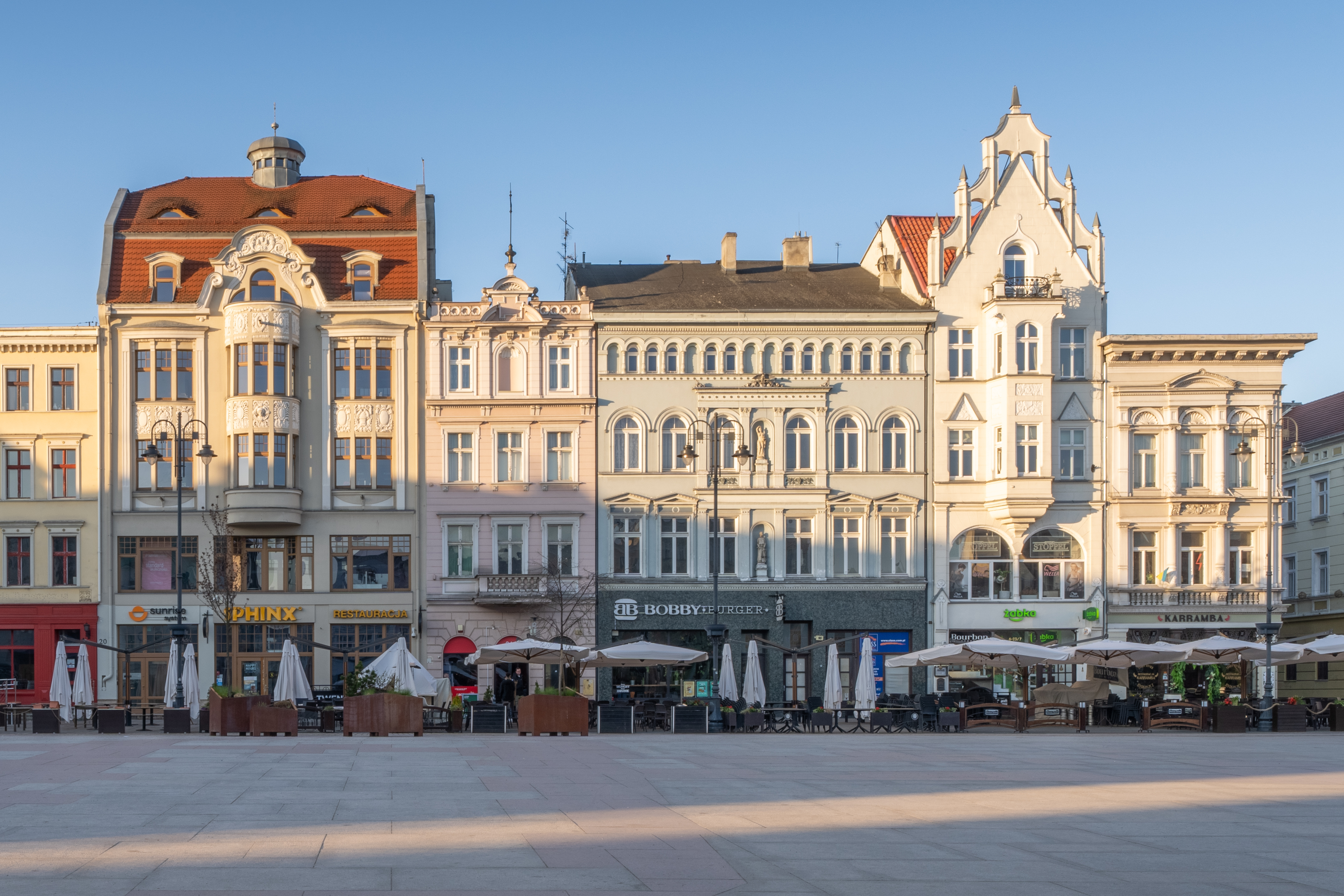
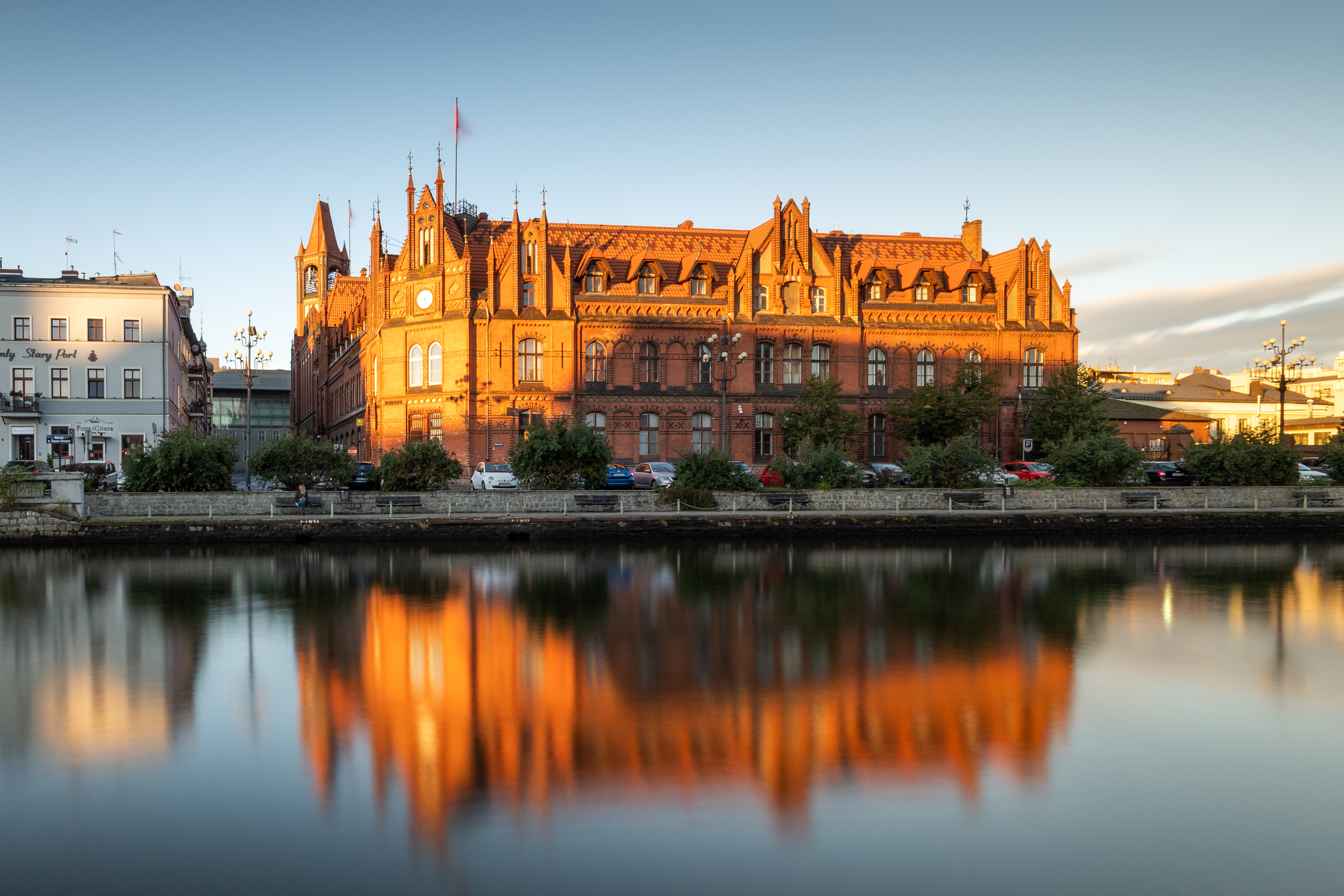
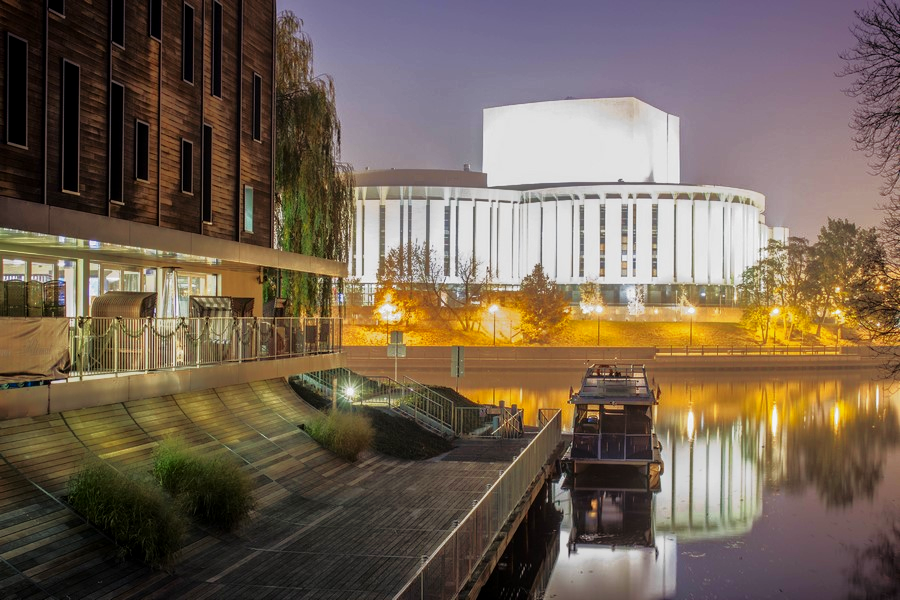
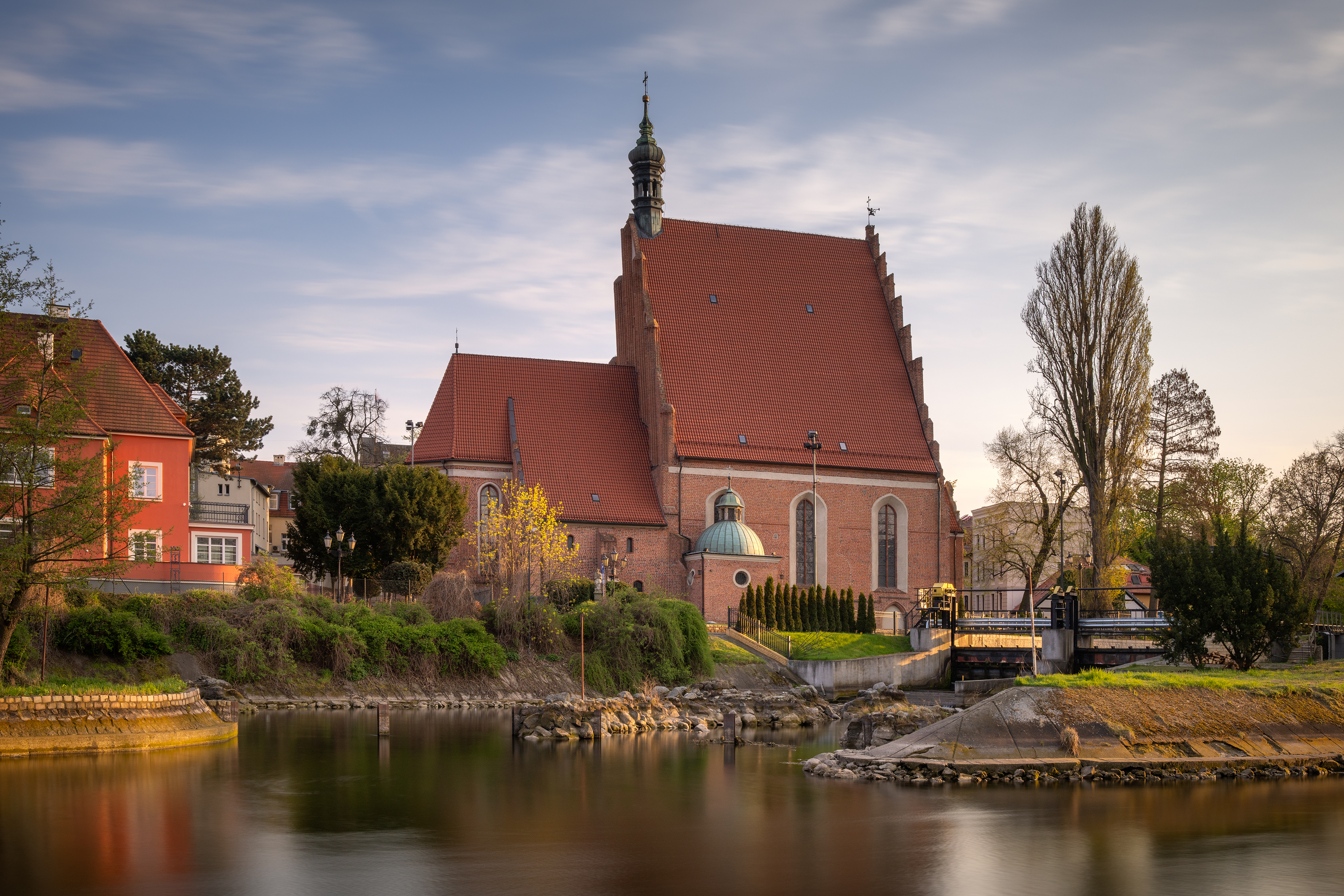
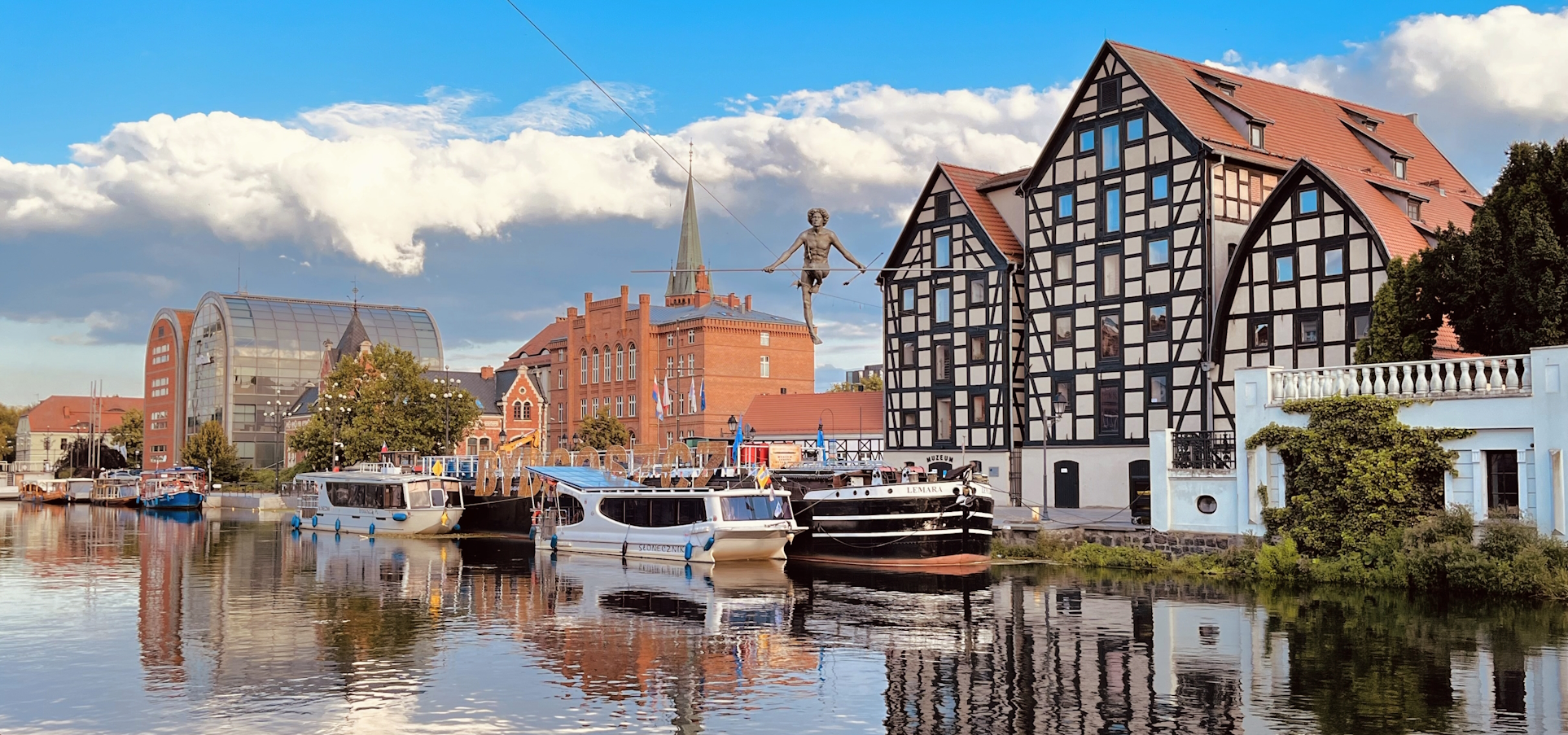
- Downtown with Freedom Square Old Market Square Main Post Office Opera Nova Cathedral Banks of the Brda River in the Old Town

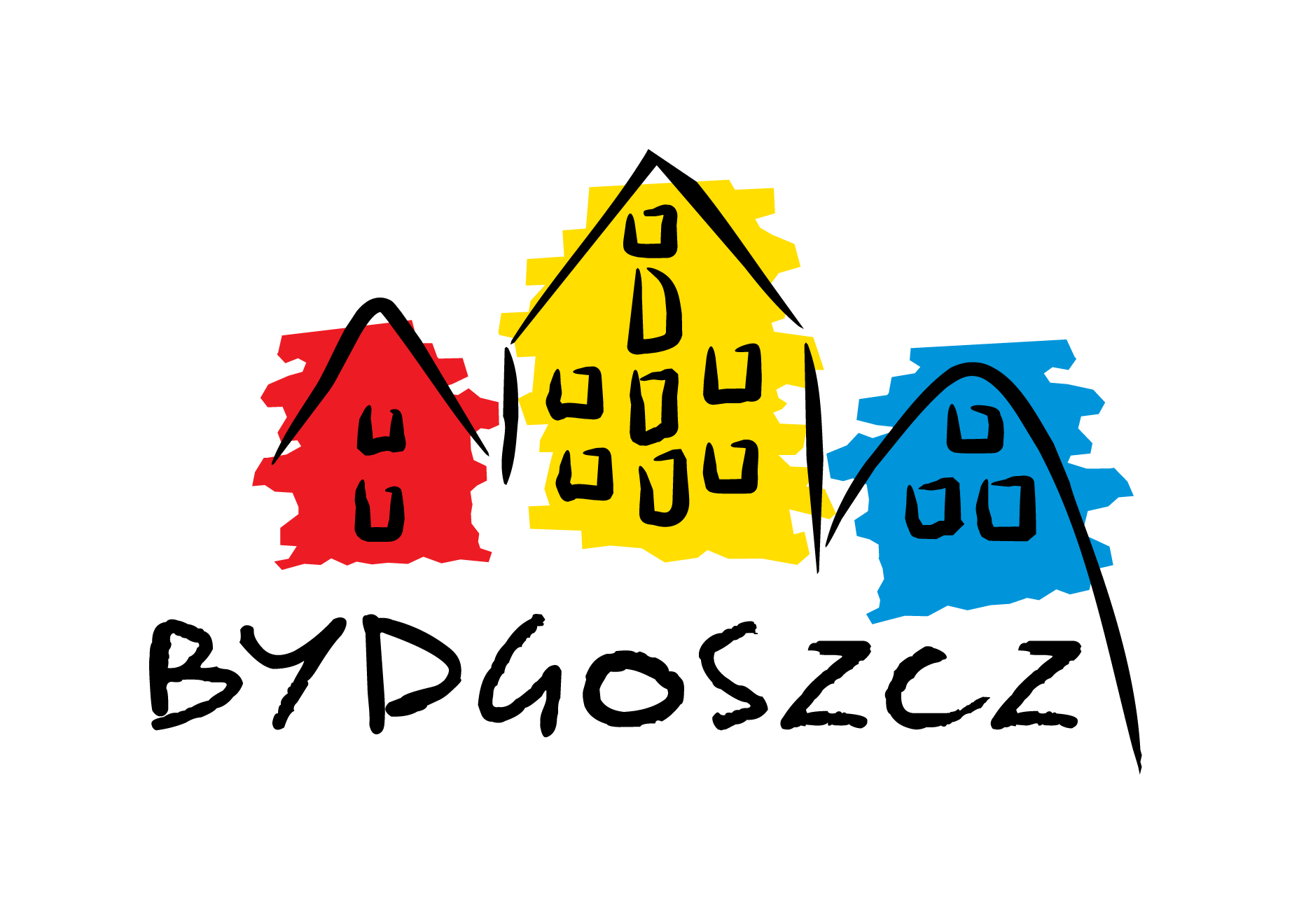
- Flag Coat of arms Brandmark
- Nicknames: Little Berlin, the Venice of the North, Polish Amsterdam
- Location within Poland
- Coordinates: 53°7′19″N 18°00′01″E
- Country: Poland
- Voivodeship: Kuyavian-Pomeranian
- County: city county
- Established: before 1238 (or before 150 if identified as Askaukalis)
- City rights: 1346

Government
  - Body: Bydgoszcz City Council
  - City mayor: Rafał Bruski (PO)
  - City Council Chairperson: Monika Matowska (PO)

Area
  - Total: 176 km^{2} (68 sq mi)
- Elevation: 60 m (200 ft)

Population (31 December 2022)
  - Total: 330,038 ▼ (8th)
  - Density: 1,875/km^{2} (4,860/sq mi)
- Demonym(s): Bydgoszczanin (male); Bydgoszczanka (female) (pl); Bromberger (de)

GDP
  - Bydgoszcz–Toruń metropolitan area: €10.871 billion (2020)
- Time zone: UTC+1 (CET)
  - Summer (DST): UTC+2 (CEST)
- Postal code: 85-001 to 85–915
- Area code: (+48) 52
- Car plates: CB
- Primary airport: Bydgoszcz Ignacy Jan Paderewski Airport
- Website: www.bydgoszcz.pl

Bydgoszcz (Note: Pronunciation: British English: /ˈbɪdɡɒʃtʃ/ BID-goshtch; American English: US: /-ɡɔːʃ(tʃ)/ -gawsh(tch); Polish: Polish pronunciation: [ˈbɨdɡɔʂt͡ʂ]; German: Bromberg, pronounced [ˈbʁɔmˌbɛʁk]; Latin: Bidgostia/Bydgostia, Brombergum; Yiddish: בידגאש, romanized: Bidgash) is a city in northern Poland and the largest city in the historical region of Kuyavia. Straddling the confluence of the Vistula River and its left-bank tributary, the Brda, the strategic location of Bydgoszcz has made it an inland port and a vital centre for trade and transportation. With a city population of 339,053 as of December 2021, Bydgoszcz is the eighth-largest city in Poland. Today, it is the seat of Bydgoszcz County and one of the two capitals of the Kuyavian-Pomeranian Voivodeship as a seat of its centrally appointed governor, a voivode.

Bydgoszcz metropolitan area comprising the city and several adjacent communities is inhabited by half a million people, and forms a part of an extended polycentric Bydgoszcz-Toruń metropolitan area with a population of approximately 0.8 million inhabitants. Since the Middle Ages, Bydgoszcz served as a royal city of the Kingdom of Poland until partitions and experienced the industrialisation period bolstered by the construction of the Bydgoszcz Canal in the late 18th century. Its academic and cultural landscape is shaped by Casimir the Great University, Bydgoszcz University of Science and Technology, the Medical College of Nicolaus Copernicus University, Feliks Nowowiejski Music Academy, the Pomeranian Philharmonic, and the Opera Nova. Bydgoszcz also plays a role of the biggest centre of NATO headquarters in Poland. The city is served by an international airport and is a member of Eurocities.

Bydgoszcz is an architecturally rich city, with Gothic, Neoclassicist, Neo-Gothic, Neo-Baroque, Modernist and Art Nouveau styles present, for which, combined with extensive green spaces, it has earned the nickname Little Berlin. The notable granaries on Mill Island and along the riverside belong to one of the most recognized timber-framed landmarks in Poland. In 2023, the city entered the UNESCO Creative Cities Network and was named UNESCO City of Music.

== Etymology ==
The name Bydgoszcz, originally Bydgoszcza, derives from Bydgost, a personal name, and the suffix -ja, denoting ownership. The German name Bromberg is an alteration of Braheberg, meaning "hill on the Brahe River" (Polish: Brda). The Latin names for the city are Bidgostia and Civitas Bidgostiensis.

In Polish, the city's name has feminine grammatical gender.

== History ==
=== Early history and first settlements ===
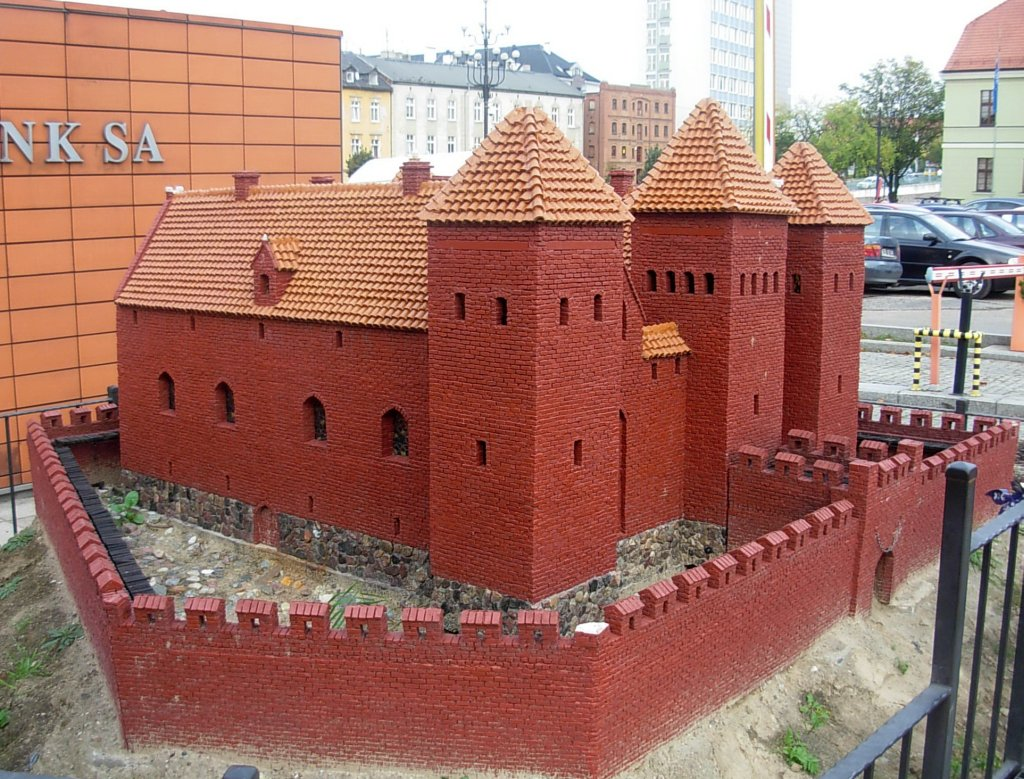
Mockup of the old castle in the Old Town

In ancient times, there was a development of settlements related to lively trade contacts with the Roman Empire, as Askaukalis a convenient location of today's Bydgoszcz laid on the Amber Road heading northwest to the Baltic coastline avoiding crossing the Vistula river.

During the early Slavic period a fishing settlement called Bydgoszcza ("Bydgostia" in Latin) became a stronghold on the Vistula trade routes.

The gród of Bydgoszcz was built between 1037 and 1053 during the reign of Casimir I the Restorer. In the 13th century it was the site of a castellany, mentioned in 1238, probably founded in the early 12th century during the reign of Bolesław III Wrymouth. In the 13th century, the church of Saint Giles was built as the first church of Bydgoszcz. The Germans later demolished it in the late 19th century. The first bridge was constructed at the reign of Casimir I of Kuyavia. In the early 14th century, the Duchy of Bydgoszcz and Wyszogród was created, with Bydgoszcz serving as its capital with Wyszogród, a settlement today within its borders.

During the Polish–Teutonic War (1326–1332), the city was captured and destroyed by the Teutonic Knights in 1330. Briefly regained by Poland, it was occupied by the Teutonic Knights from 1331 to 1337 and annexed to their monastic state as Bromberg. In 1337, it was recaptured by Poland and was relinquished by the Knights in 1343 at their signing of the Treaty of Kalisz along with Dobrzyń and the remainder of Kuyavia.

=== Royal city of Poland ===
King Casimir III of Poland granted Bydgoszcz city rights (charter) on 19 April 1346. The king granted a number of privileges, regarding river trade on the Brda and Vistula and the right to mint coins, and ordered the construction of the castle, which became the seat of the castellan. Bydgoszcz was an important royal city of Poland located in the Inowrocław Voivodeship.

The city increasingly saw an influx of Jews after that date. In 1555, however, due to pressure from the clergy, the Jews were expelled and returned only with their annexation to Prussia in 1772. After 1370, Bydgoszcz castle was the favourite residence of the grandson of the king and his would-be successor Duke Casimir IV, who died there in 1377. In 1397 thanks to Queen Jadwiga of Poland, a Carmelite convent was established in the city, the third in Poland after Gdańsk and Kraków.

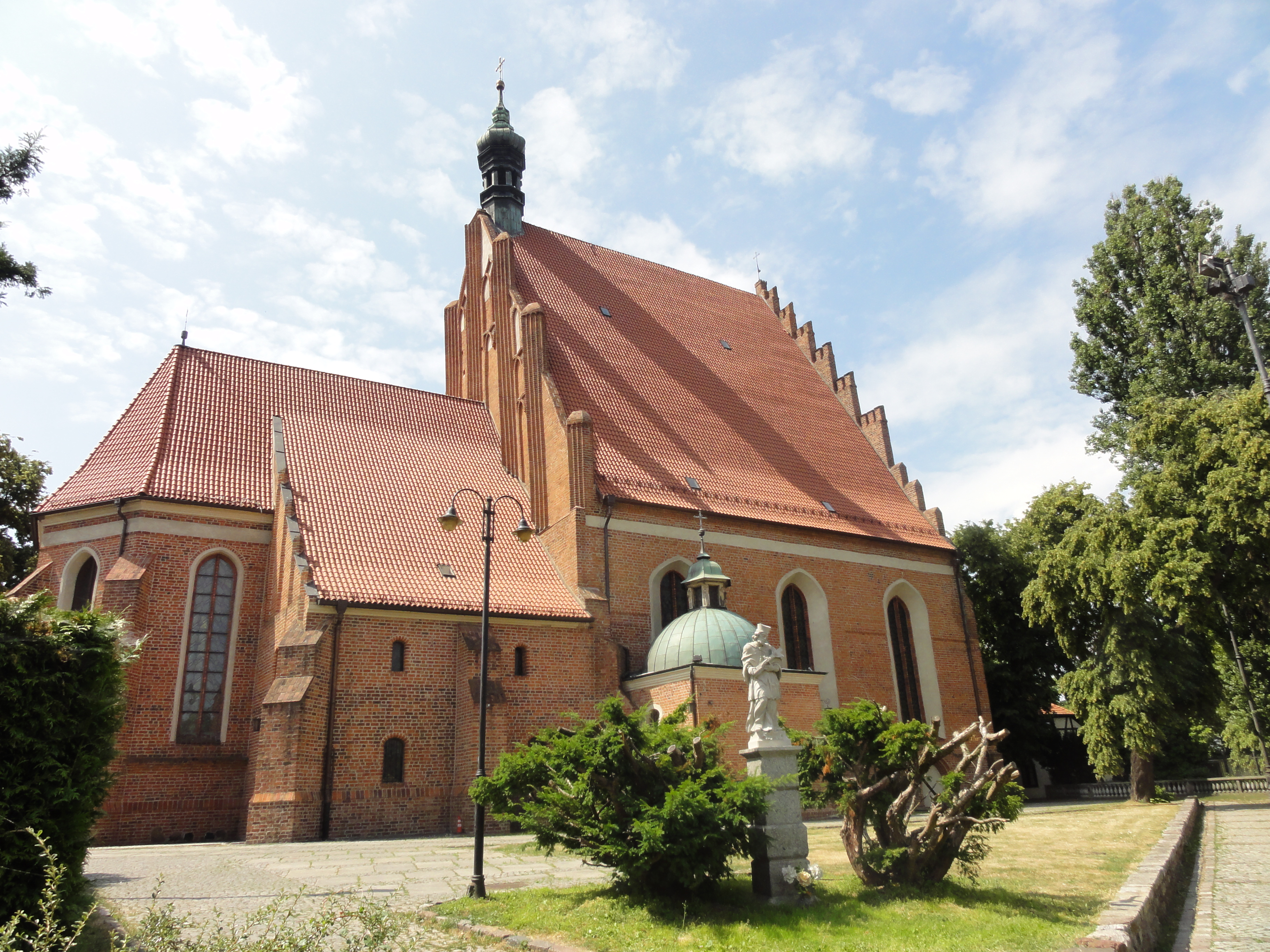
Brick Gothic Bydgoszcz Cathedral

During the Polish–Lithuanian–Teutonic War in 1409 the city was briefly captured by the Teutonic Knights. In the mid-15th century, during the Thirteen Years' War, King Casimir IV of Poland often stayed in Bydgoszcz. At that time, the defensive walls were built and the Gothic parish church (the present-day Bydgoszcz Cathedral). The city was developing dynamically thanks to river trade. Bydgoszcz pottery and beer were popular throughout Poland. In the 15th and 16th centuries, Bydgoszcz was a significant location for wheat trading, one of the largest in Poland. The first mention of a school in Bydgoszcz is from 1466.

In 1480, a Bernardine monastery was established in Bydgoszcz. The Bernardines erected a new Gothic church and founded a library, part of which has survived to this day. A Sejm of the Kingdom of Poland was held in Bydgoszcz in 1520. In 1522, after a decision taken by the Polish king, a salt depot was established in Bydgoszcz, the second in the region after Toruń. In 1594, Stanisław Cikowski founded a private mint, which in the early 17th century was transformed into a royal mint, one of the leading mints in Poland.

In 1621, on the occasion of the Polish victory over the Ottoman Empire at Chocim, one of the most valuable and largest coins in the history of Europe was minted in Bydgoszcz – 100 ducats of Sigismund III Vasa. In 1617 the Jesuits came to the city, and subsequently established a Jesuit college.

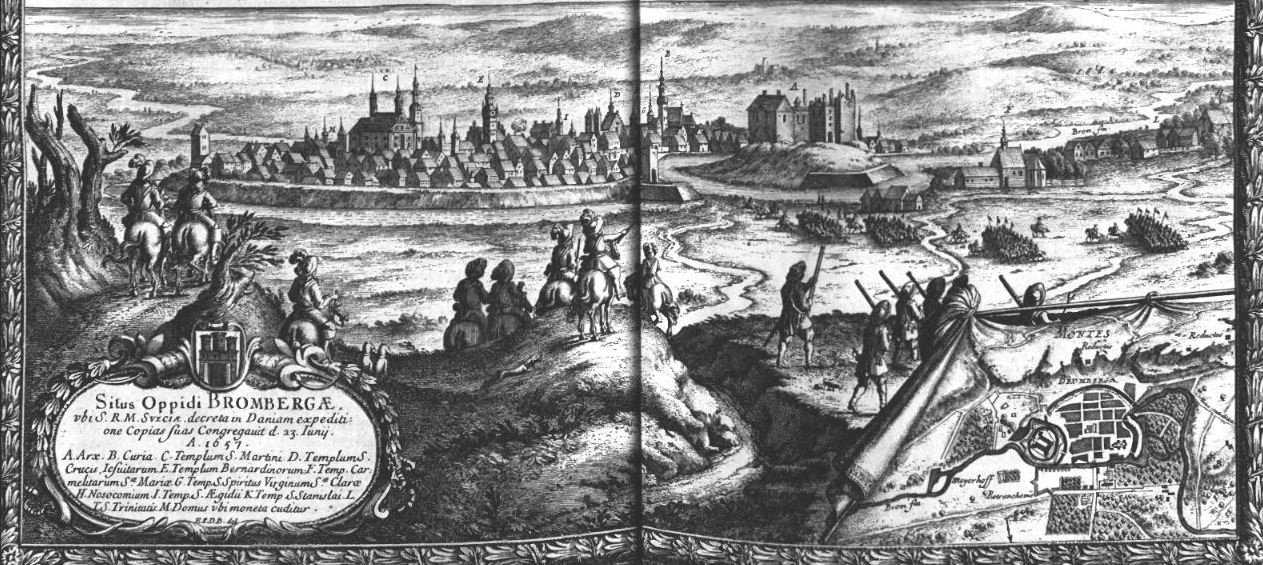
Panorama of Bydgoszcz in 1657 by Erik Dahlbergh at the time of Swedish occupation.

During the year of 1629, shortly before the end of the Polish-Swedish War of 1626–29, the town was conquered by Swedish troops led by king Gustav II Adolph of Sweden personally. During this war, the town suffered destruction. The town was conquered a second and third time by Sweden in 1656 and 1657 during the Second Northern War. On the latter occasion, the castle was destroyed completely and has since remained a ruin. After the war only 94 houses were inhabited, 103 stood empty and 35 had burned down. The suburbs had also been considerably damaged.

The Treaty of Bromberg, agreed in 1657 by King John II Casimir Vasa of Poland and Elector Frederick William II of Brandenburg-Prussia, created a military alliance between Poland and Prussia while marking the withdrawal of Prussia from its alliance with Sweden.

After the Convocation Sejm of 1764, Bydgoszcz became one of three seats of the Crown Tribunal for the Greater Poland Province of the Polish Crown alongside Poznań and Piotrków Trybunalski. In 1766 royal cartographer Franciszek Florian Czaki, during a meeting of the Committee of the Crown Treasury in Warsaw, proposed a plan of building a canal, which would connect the Vistula via the Brda with the Noteć river. Józef Wybicki, Polish jurist and political activist best known as the author of the lyrics of the national anthem of Poland, worked at the Crown Tribunal in Bydgoszcz.

=== Late modern period ===
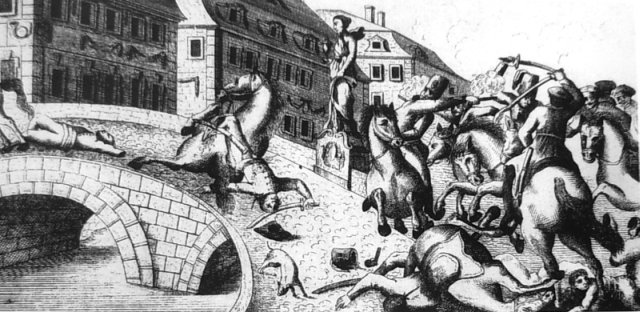
Battle of Bydgoszcz in 1794 during Kościuszko Uprising.

In 1772, in the First Partition of Poland, the town was acquired by the Kingdom of Prussia as Bromberg and incorporated into the Netze District in the newly established province of West Prussia. At the time, the town was seriously depressed and semi-derelict. Under Frederick the Great the town revived, notably with the construction of a canal from Bromberg to Nakel (Nakło) which connected the north-flowing Vistula River via the Brda to the west-flowing Noteć, which in turn flowed to the Oder via the Warta. From this period until the end of the German Empire, a large majority of the city's inhabitants spoke German as their main language, and the city would later acquire the nickname "little Berlin" from its similar architectural appearance to the prewar image of the German capital and the work of shared architects such as Friedrich Adler, Ferdinand Lepcke, Heinrich Seeling, or Henry Gross. During the Kościuszko Uprising, in 1794 the city was briefly recaptured by Poles, commanded by General Jan Henryk Dąbrowski, and the local Polish administration was co-organized by Józef Wybicki.

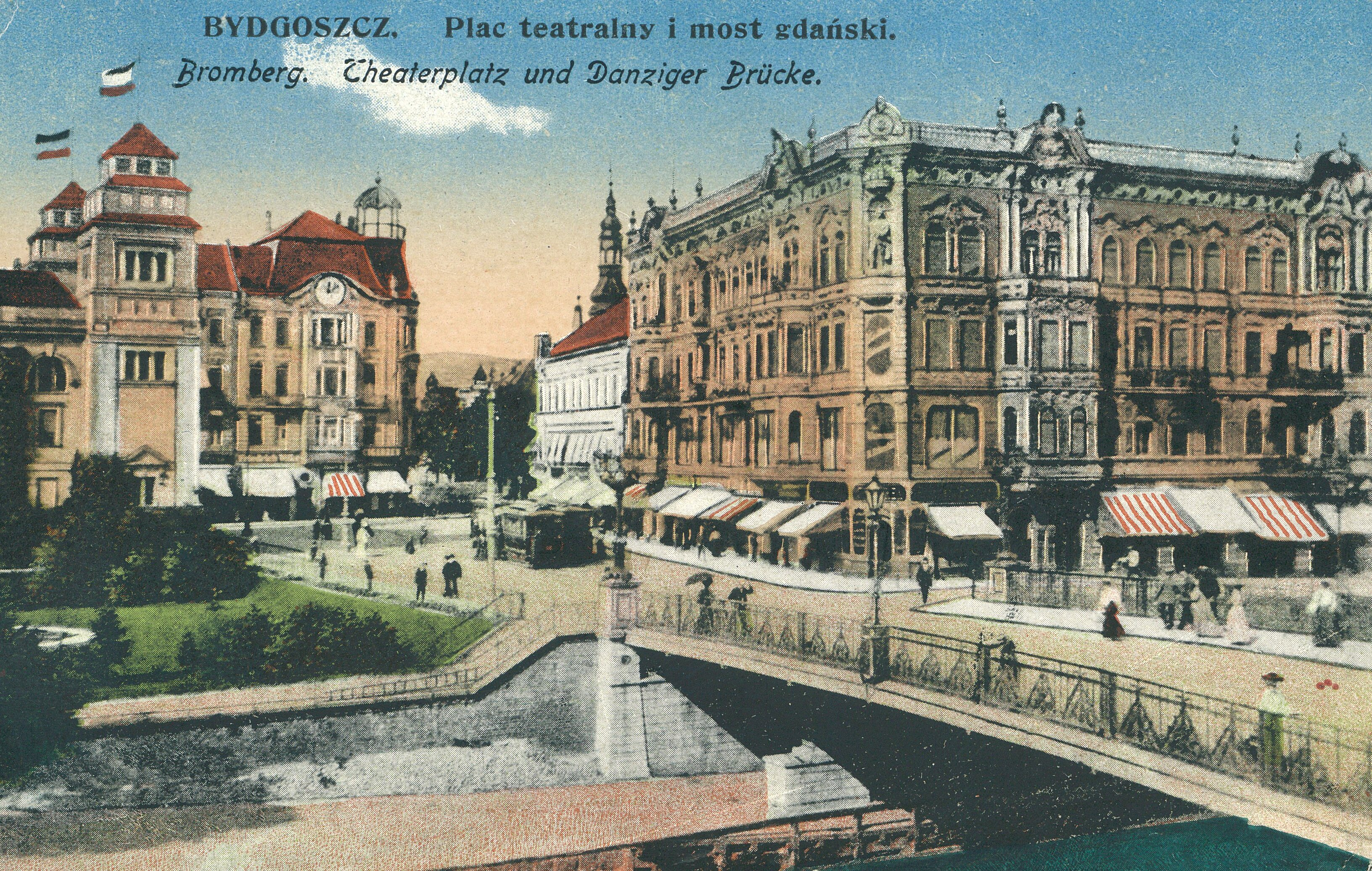
A postcard (ca 1899-1916), on the left the municipal theatre, demolished in 1945.

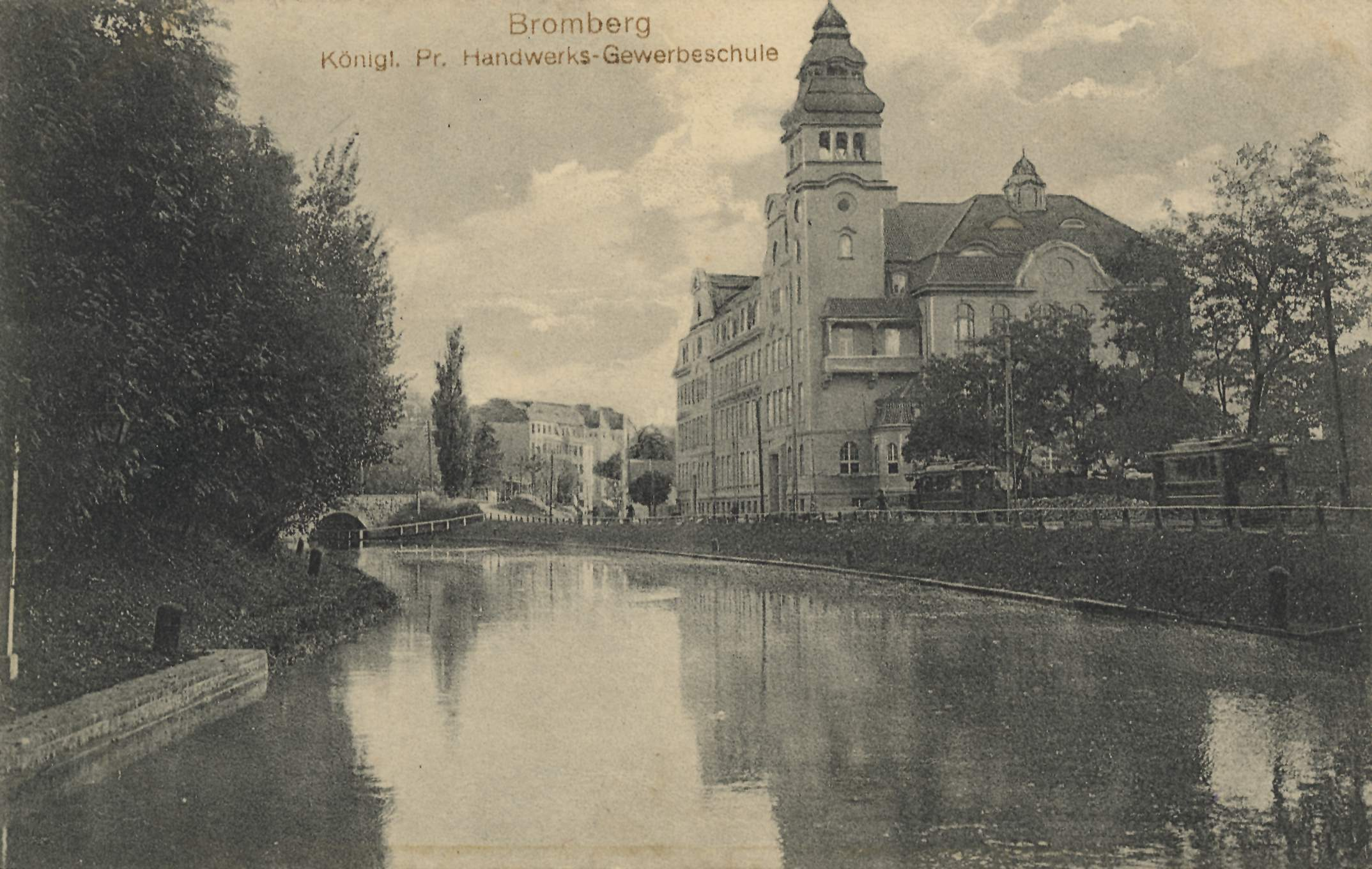
Bydgoszcz Canal was one of the key contributions to the city's industrialisation.

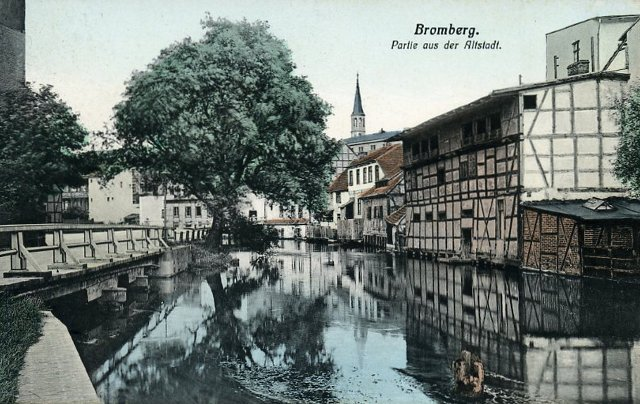
An architectural ensemble of tenements built along the leat canal of the Brda river near Mill Island would often become inspiration for local artists.

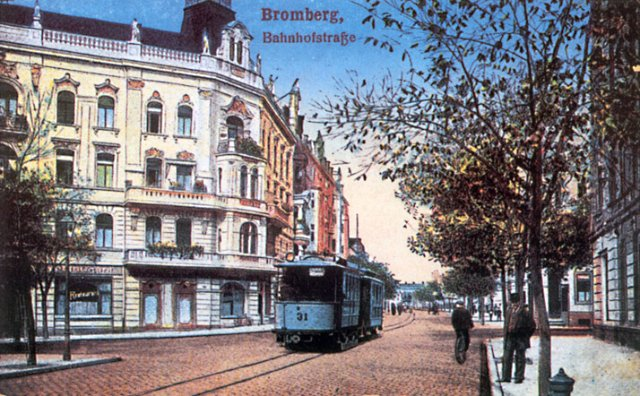
Dworcowa Street developed rapidly after the construction of the main railway station in 1851 and became a home for the Prussian Eastern Railway headquarters.

In 1807, after the defeat of Prussia by Napoleon and the signing of the Treaty of Tilsit, Bydgoszcz became part of the short-lived Polish Duchy of Warsaw, within which it was the seat of the Bydgoszcz Department. With Napoleon's defeat at the Battle of Nations in 1813, the town was re-annexed by Prussia as part of the Grand Duchy of Posen (Poznań), becoming the capital of the Bromberg Region. During the November Uprising, a Polish insurgent organization was active in the city and local Poles helped smuggle volunteers, weapons and ammunition to the Russian Partition of Poland. After the fall of the uprising, one of the main escape routes for surviving insurgents and civilian insurgent authorities from partitioned Poland to the Great Emigration led through the city.

In 1871 the Province of Posen, along with the rest of the Kingdom of Prussia, became part of the newly formed German Empire. During German rule, the oldest church of the city (church of Saint Giles), the remains of the castle, and the Carmelite church and monastery were demolished. In the mid-19th century, the city saw the arrival of the Prussian Eastern Railway. The first stretch, from Schneidemühl (Piła), was opened in July 1851.

At the time of World War I, Poles in Bydgoszcz formed secret organizations, preparing to regain control of the city in the event of Poland regaining its independence.

=== Interbellum ===
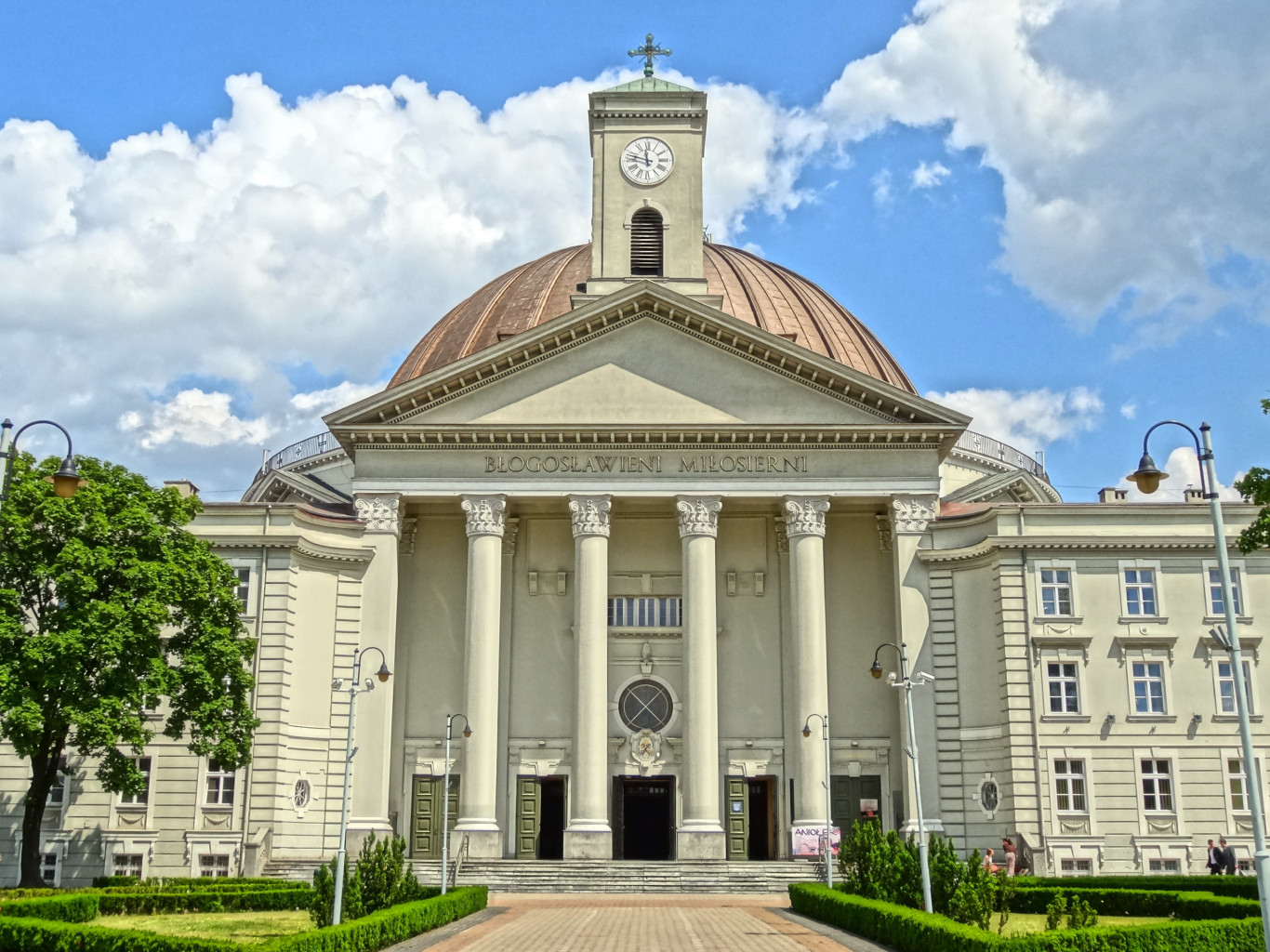
The construction of Neoclassical Saint Vincent de Paul Basilica was dedicated to the return of the city to the Poles.

After the war, Bydgoszcz was assigned to the recreated Polish state by the 1919 Versailles Treaty. Now officially Bydgoszcz again, the city belonged to the Poznań Voivodeship. The local populace was required to acquire Polish citizenship or leave the country. This led to a drastic decline in ethnically German residents, whose number within the town decreased from over 40.000 in 1910 to 11,016 in 1926. A Nazi German youth organization was subsequently founded, which distributed Nazi propaganda books from Germany among the German minority.

The city's boundaries were greatly expanded in 1920 to include the surrounding suburbs of Okole, Szwederowo, Bartodzieje, Kapuściska, Wilczak, Jachcice and more, which made Bydgoszcz the third largest city in the Second Polish Republic in terms of area. In 1938, the city was made part of the Polish Greater Pomerania.

=== World War II ===
Public executions of Poles by Nazis on 9 September 1939

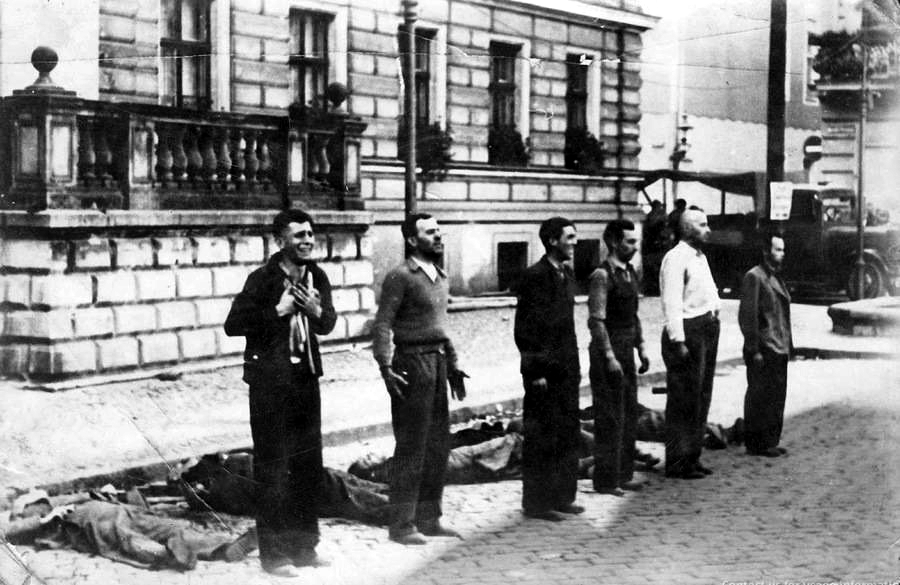
Execution of Polish civilians caught by the Germans in a street roundup

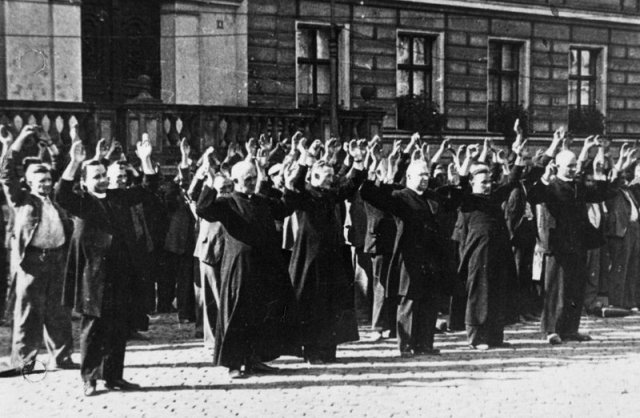
Execution of Polish priests and civilians in the Old Market Square

During the invasion of Poland, at the beginning of World War II, on September 1, 1939, Germany carried out air raids on the city. The Polish 15th Infantry Division, which was stationed in Bydgoszcz, fought off German attacks on September 2, but on September 3 was forced to retreat. During the withdrawal of Poles, as part of the diversion planned by Germany, local Germans opened fire on Polish soldiers and civilians. Polish soldiers and civilians were forced into a defensive battle in which several hundred people were killed on both sides. The event, referred to as the Bloody Sunday by the propaganda of Nazi Germany, which exaggerated the number of victims to 5,000 "defenceless" Germans, was used as an excuse to carry out dozens of mass executions of Polish residents in the Old Market Square and in the Valley of Death. Between September 3–10, 1939, the Germans executed 192 Poles in the city.

On September 5, while the Wehrmacht entered the city, German-Polish skirmishes still took place in the Szwederowo district, and the German occupation of the city began. The German Einsatzgruppe IV, Einsatzkommando 16 and SS-Totenkopf-Standarte "Brandenburg" entered the city to commit atrocities against the Polish population, and afterwards some of its members co-formed the local German police. Many of the murders were carried out as part of the Intelligenzaktion, aimed at exterminating the Polish elites and preventing the establishment of a Polish resistance movement, which emerged nevertheless. On September 24, the local German Kreisleiter called local Polish city officials to a supposed formal meeting in the city hall, from where they were taken to a nearby forest and exterminated. The Kreisleiter also ordered the execution of their family members to "avoid creating martyrs". By decision from September 5, 1939, one of the first three German special courts in occupied Poland was established in Bydgoszcz.

The Germans established several camps and prisons for Poles. As of September 30, 1939, over 3,000 individuals were imprisoned there, and in October and November, the Germans carried out further mass arrests of over 7,200 people. Many of those people were then murdered. Poles from Bydgoszcz were massacred at various locations in the city, at the Valley of Death and in the nearby village of Tryszczyn. The victims were both men and women, including activists, school principals, teachers, priests, local officials, merchants, lawyers, and also boy and girl scouts, gymnasium students and children as young as 12. The executions were presented as punishment for supposedly "murdering Germans" and "destroying peace", and were used by Nazi propaganda to show the world that it was alleged "Polish terror" that forced Hitler to start the war. On the Polish National Independence Day, November 11, 1939, the Germans symbolically publicly executed Leon Barciszewski, the mayor of Bydgoszcz. On November 17, 1939, the commander of the local SD-EK unit declared there was no more Polish intelligentsia capable of resistance in the city.

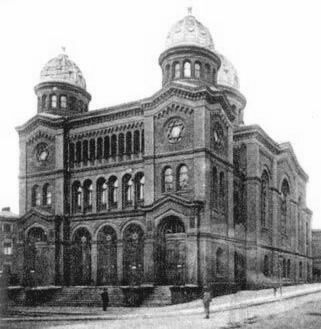
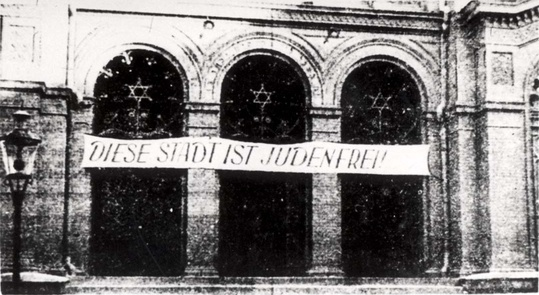
The local synagogue was destroyed during the German occupation. The inscription reads in German: "This city is free of Jews".

The city was annexed to the newly formed province of Reichsgau Danzig-West Prussia as the seat of the district or county (kreis) of Bromberg. However, the annexation was not recognised in international law. Extermination of the inhabitants continued throughout the war, and in total, around 10,000 inhabitants, mostly Poles, but also Polish Jews, were killed. Some Polish inhabitants were also murdered in the village of Jastrzębie in January 1940, and local teachers were also among Polish teachers murdered in both Mauthausen and Dachau concentration camps. The history of Jews in Bydgoszcz ended with the German invasion of Poland and the Holocaust. The city's Jewish citizens, who constituted a small community in the city (about two percent of the prewar population) and many of whom spoke German, were sent to extermination camps or murdered in the town itself. The city renamed Bromberg was the site of Bromberg-Ost, a women's subcamp of the Stutthof concentration camp. A deportation camp was situated in Smukała village, now part of Bydgoszcz. On February 4, 1941, the first mass transport of 524 Poles came to the Potulice concentration camp from Bydgoszcz. The local train station was one of the locations, where Polish children aged 12 and over were sent from the Potulice concentration camp to slave labor. The children reloaded freight trains.

During the occupation, the Germans destroyed some of the city's historic buildings to erect new structures in the Nazi style. The Germans built a huge secret dynamite factory (DAG Fabrik Bromberg) hidden in a forest in which they used the slave labor of several hundred forced laborers, including Allied prisoners of war from the Stalag XX-A POW camp in Toruń. In 1943, local Poles managed to save some kidnapped Polish children from the Zamość region, by buying them from the Germans at the local train station.

The Polish resistance was active in Bydgoszcz. Activities included distribution of underground Polish press, sabotage actions, stealing German ammunition to aid Polish partisans, espionage of German activity and providing shelter for British POWs who escaped from the Stalag XX-A POW camp. The Gestapo cracked down on the Polish resistance several times.

In spring 1945, Bydgoszcz was occupied by the advancing Red Army. Those German residents who had survived fled or were expelled and the city was returned to Poland, although with a Soviet-installed communist regime, which stayed in power until the 1980s. The Polish resistance remained active in Bydgoszcz.

=== Post-war period ===
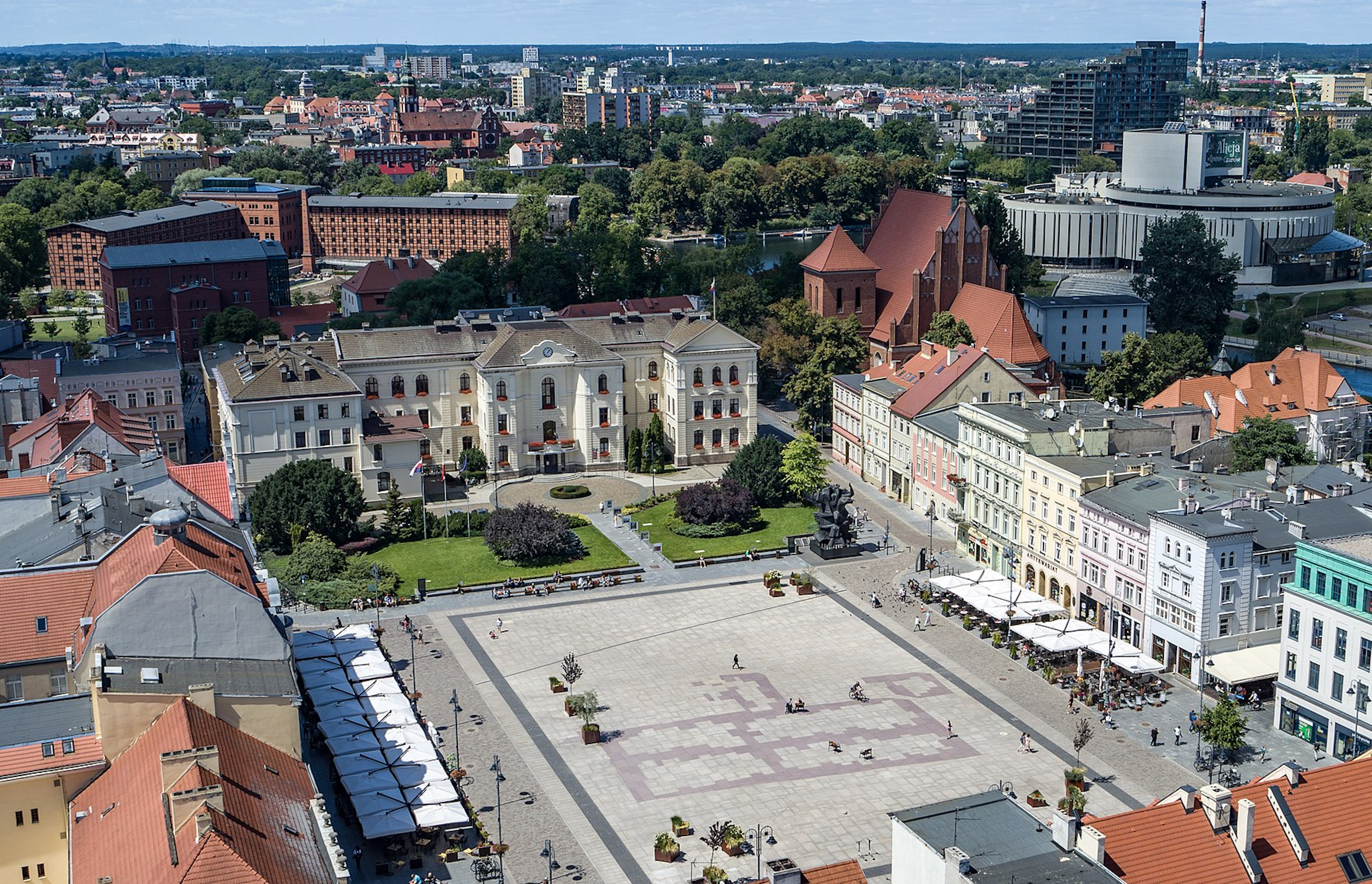
Contemporary rear view of the Old Market Square with Mill Island, Opera Nova, and Nordic Haven in the background.

In the same year 1945, the city was made the seat of the Pomeranian Voivodship, the northern part of which was soon separated to form Gdańsk Voivodship. The remaining part of the Pomeranian Voivodship was renamed Bydgoszcz Voivodeship in 1950. In 1951 and 1969, Bydgoszcz University of Science and Technology and Kazimierz Wielki University in Bydgoszcz were founded respectively.

In 1973, the former town of Fordon, located on the left bank of the Vistula, was included in the city limits and became the easternmost district of Bydgoszcz. In March 1981, Solidarity's activists were violently suppressed in Bydgoszcz.

With the Polish local government reforms of 1999, Bydgoszcz became the seat of the governor of a province entitled Kuyavian-Pomeranian Voivodeship. In 2005, Casimir the Great University was opened in Bydgoszcz.

Currently, Bydgoszcz is the biggest center of NATO headquarters in Poland, the most known being the Joint Force Training Centre. In May 2023, debris of a Russian Kh-55 air-sol missile was found in the forest of the near village Zamość.

== Main sights ==
The oldest building in the city is the Cathedral of St Martin and St Nicolas, commonly known as Fara Church. It is a three-aisle late Gothic church, erected between 1466 and 1502, which boasts a late-Gothic painting entitled Madonna with a Rose or the Holy Virgin of Beautiful Love from the 16th century. The colourful 20th-century polychrome is also especially worthy of note.

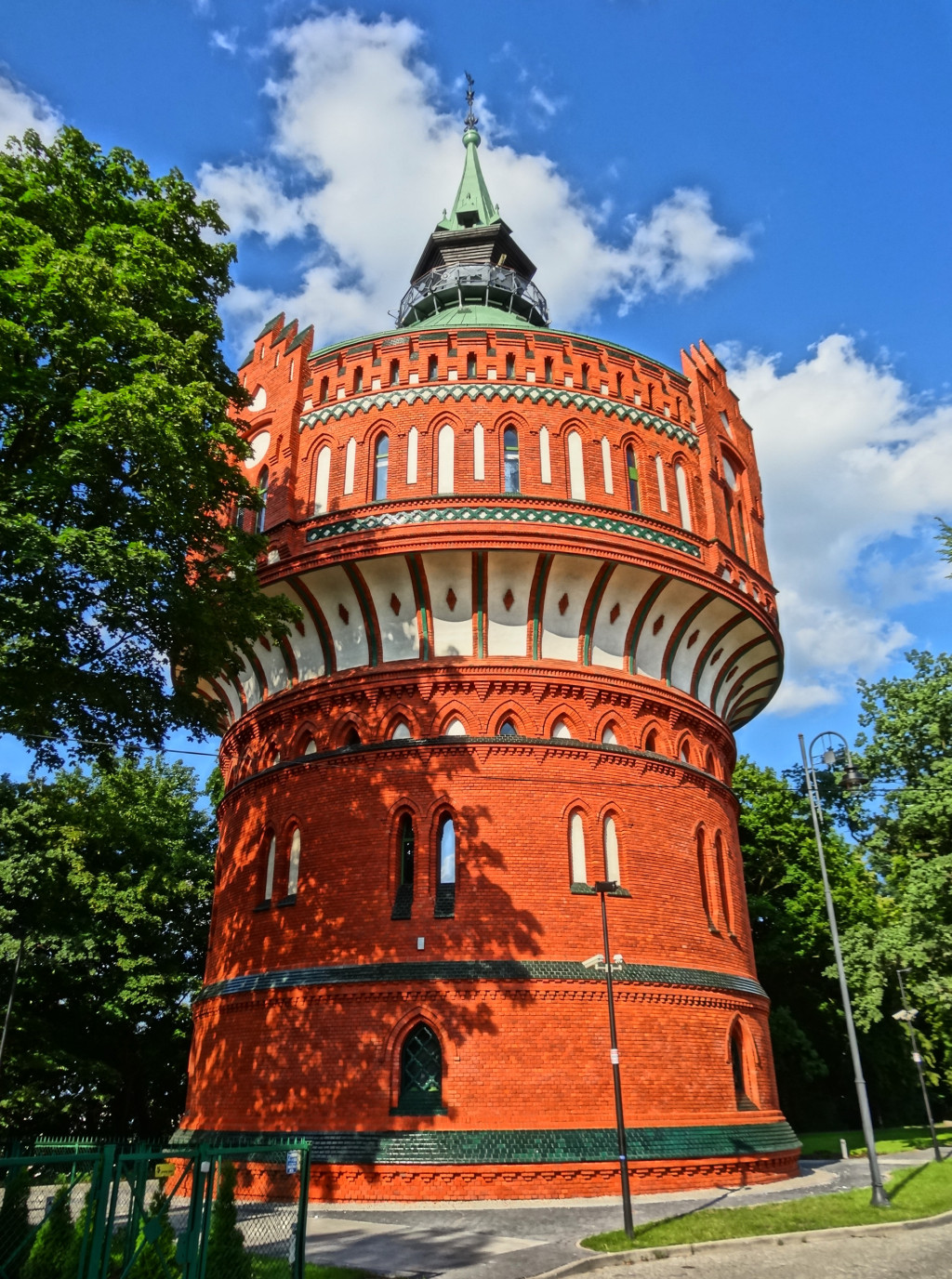
19th-century water tower

The Church of the Assumption of the Holy Virgin, commonly referred to as "The Church of Poor Clares," is a famous landmark of the city. It is a small, Gothic-Renaissance (including Neo-Renaissance additions), single-aisle church built between 1582 and 1602. The interior is rather austere since the church has been stripped of most of its furnishings. This is not a surprising fact, considering that in the 19th century the Prussian authorities dissolved the Order of St Clare and turned the church into a warehouse, among other uses. Nonetheless, the church is worth visiting. In particular, the original wooden polychrome ceiling dating from the 17th century draws the attention of every visitor.

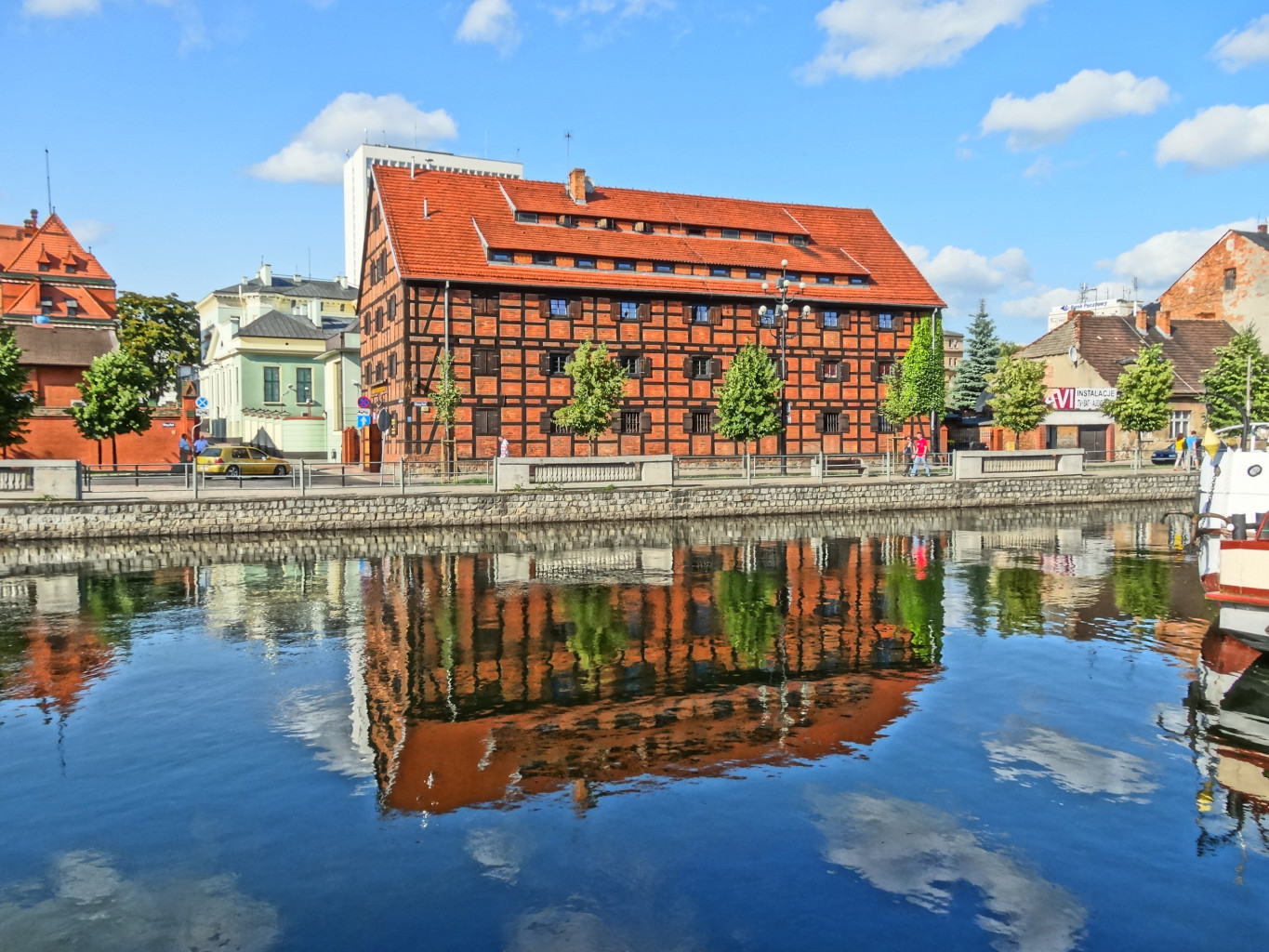
The Old Port Granary built in 1835

Wyspa Młyńska (Mill Island) is among one of the most atmospheric places in Bydgoszcz. It is located in the heart of the city centre, just a few steps from the old Market Square. It was the industrial centre of Bydgoszcz in the Middle Ages and for several hundred years thereafter, and it was here that the royal mint operated in the 17th century. Most of the buildings which can still be seen on the island date from the 19th century, but the so-called Biały Spichlerz (the White Granary) recalls the end of the 18th century. However, it is the water, footbridges, historic red-brick tenement houses, and the old chestnut trees, that create the unique atmosphere of the island.

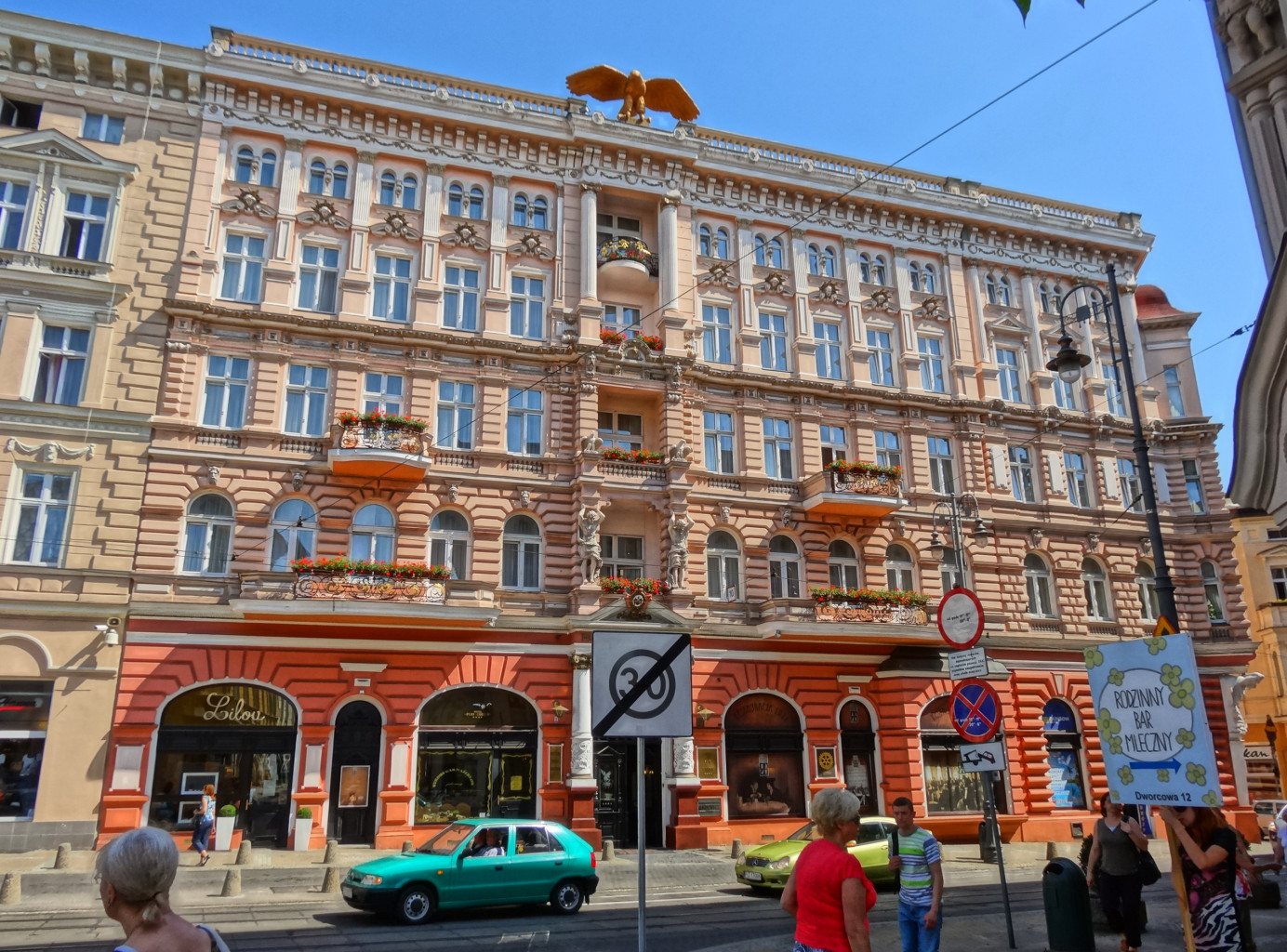
Hotel Pod Orlem

"Hotel pod Orłem" (The Eagle Hotel), an icon of the city's 19th-century architecture, was designed by the distinguished Bydgoszcz architect Józef Święcicki, the author of around sixty buildings in the city. Completed in 1896, it served as a hotel from the very beginning and was originally owned by Emil Bernhardt, a hotel manager educated in Switzerland. Its façade displays forms characteristic of the Neo-baroque style in architecture.

Saint Vincent de Paul's Basilica, erected between 1925 and 1939, is the largest church in Bydgoszcz and one of the biggest in Poland. It can accommodate around 12,000 people. This monumental church, modeled after the Pantheon in Rome, was designed by the Polish architect Adam Ballenstaedt. The most characteristic element of the neo-classical temple is the reinforced concrete dome 40 metres in diameter.

The three granaries in Grodzka Street, picturesquely located on the Brda River near the old Market Square, are the official symbol of the city. Built at the turn of the 19th century, they were originally used to store grain and similar products, but now house exhibitions of the city's Leon Wyczółkowski District Museum.

The building of the former Prussian Eastern Railway Headquarters erected between 1886 and 1889 in Dutch Mannierist style is another notable structure in the city. Initially it served as a headquarters of the Prussian Eastern Railway and later it belonged to the Polish State Railways. Since 2022 it is privately owned.

The city is mostly associated with water, sports, Art Nouveau buildings, waterfront, music, and urban greenery. Bydgoszcz boasts the largest city park in Poland (830 ha). The city was also once famous for its industry.

Some major landmarks have been destroyed, for example, the church in the Old Market Square and the Municipal Theatre. Additionally, the Old Town lost a few characteristic tenement houses, including the western frontage of the Market Square. The city also lost its Gothic castle and defensive walls. In Bydgoszcz, there are a great number of villas in the style of typical garden suburbs.

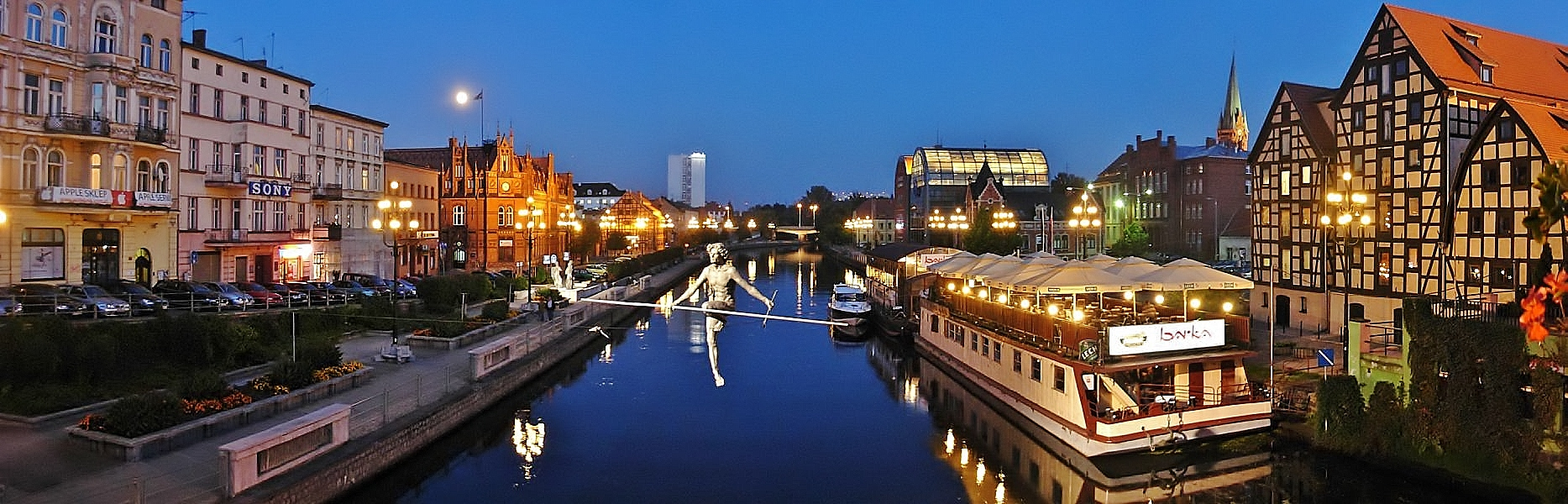
Buildings on the Brda River at dusk, with the 2004 Tightrope sculpture (Man Crossing the River (Polish: Przechodzący przez rzekę).

== Economy and demographics ==
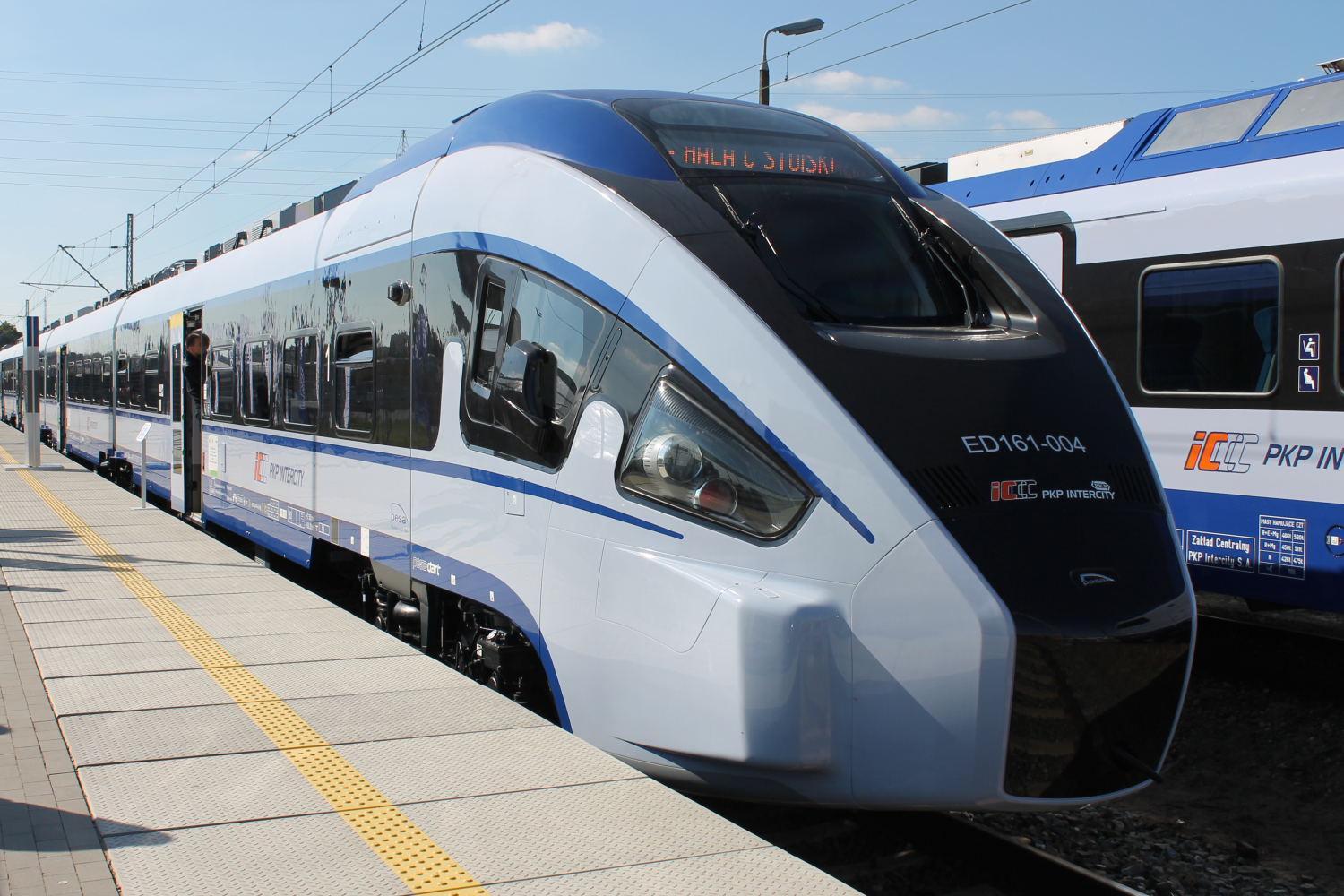
PESA SA is headquartered in Bydgoszcz

Historical population
Year	Pop.	±%
1950	162,524	—
1960	232,007	+42.8%
1970	282,200	+21.6%
1978	338,014	+19.8%
1988	377,807	+11.8%
2002	373,804	−1.1%
2011	363,926	−2.6%
2021	337,666	−7.2%

In the city, there are 38 banks represented through a network of 116 branches (including the headquarters of the Bank Pocztowy SA), whilst 37 insurance companies also have offices in the city. JP Morgan Chase, one of the largest financial institutions in the world, has established a branch in Bydgoszcz. Most industrial complexes are scattered throughout the city. Of note are the 'Zachem' chemical works, covering dozens of square kilometers in the south-east of the city. These remnants of the German explosives factory built in World War II occupy an area which has its own rail lines, internal communication and housing, plus a large forested area. An open-air museum, the Exploseum, is located here as well.

Since 2001, Bydgoszcz has been annually subjected to international 'verification' ratings. In February 2008 the 'Fitch Ratings' Agency recategorised the city, increasing its rating from BBB-(stable forecast) to BBB (stable estimate).

In 2004, Bydgoszcz launched an Industrial and Technology Park of 283 hectares, an attractive place for doing business as companies that relocate there receive tax breaks, 24-hour security, access to large plots of land and to the media, the railway line Chorzów Batory – Tczew (passenger, coal), the DK5 and DK10 national roads, and future freeways S10 and S5. Bydgoszcz Airport is also close by.

== Culture ==
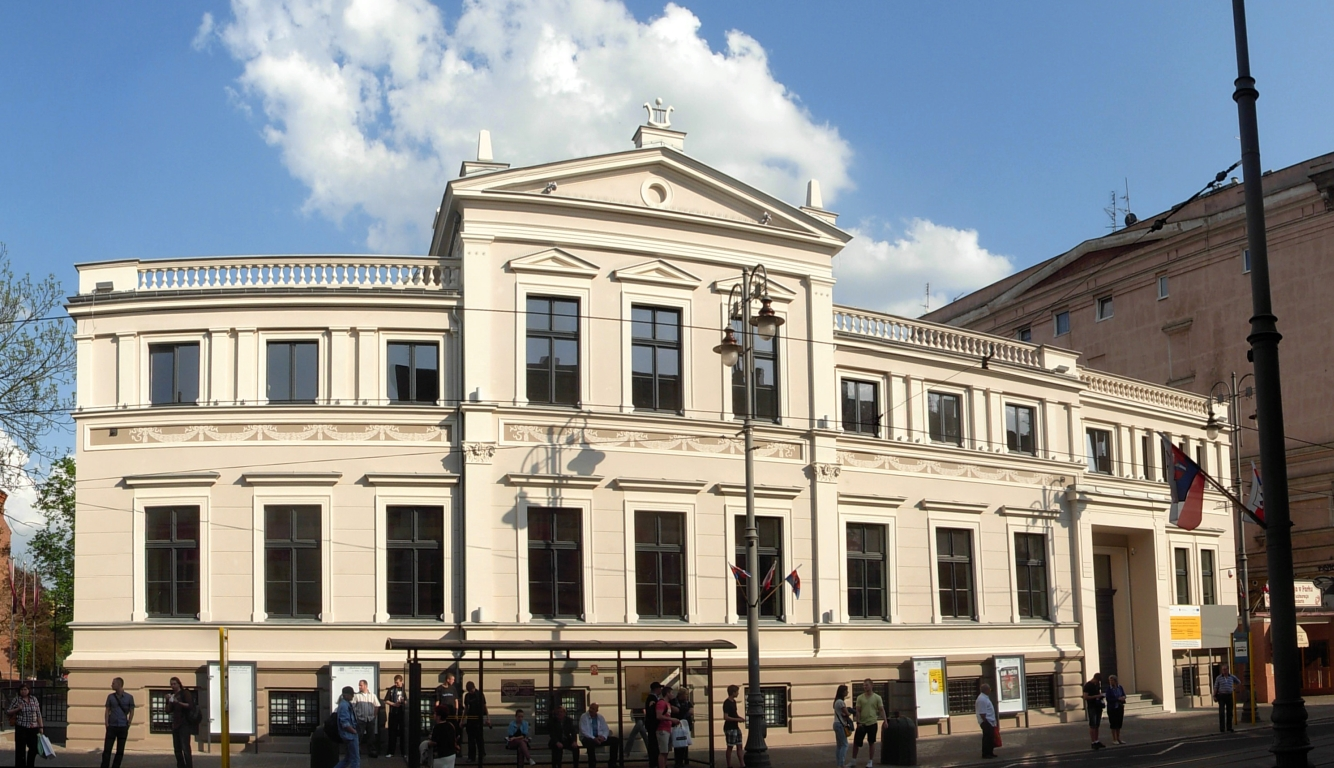
The Arts House on Gdańska Street, currently in the hands of Feliks Nowowiejski Music Academy.

Bydgoszcz is a major cultural centre in the country, especially for music. Traditions of the municipal theatre date back to the 17th century, when the Jesuit college built a theatre. In 1824, a permanent theatre building was erected, and this was rebuilt in 1895 in a monumental form by the Berlin architect Heinrich Seeling. The first music school was established in Bydgoszcz in 1904; it had close links to the very well-known European piano factory of Bruno Sommerfeld. Numerous orchestras and choirs, both German (Gesangverein, Liedertafel) and Polish (St. Wojciech Halka, Moniuszko), have also made the city their home. Since 1974, Bydgoszcz has been home to a very prestigious Academy of Music. Bydgoszcz is also an important place for contemporary European culture; one of the most important European centers of jazz music, the Brain club, was founded in Bydgoszcz by Jacek Majewski and Slawomir Janicki.

Bydgoszcz was a candidate for the title of European Capital of Culture in 2016. It joined the list of UNESCO's Cities of Music in 2023.

=== Museums ===
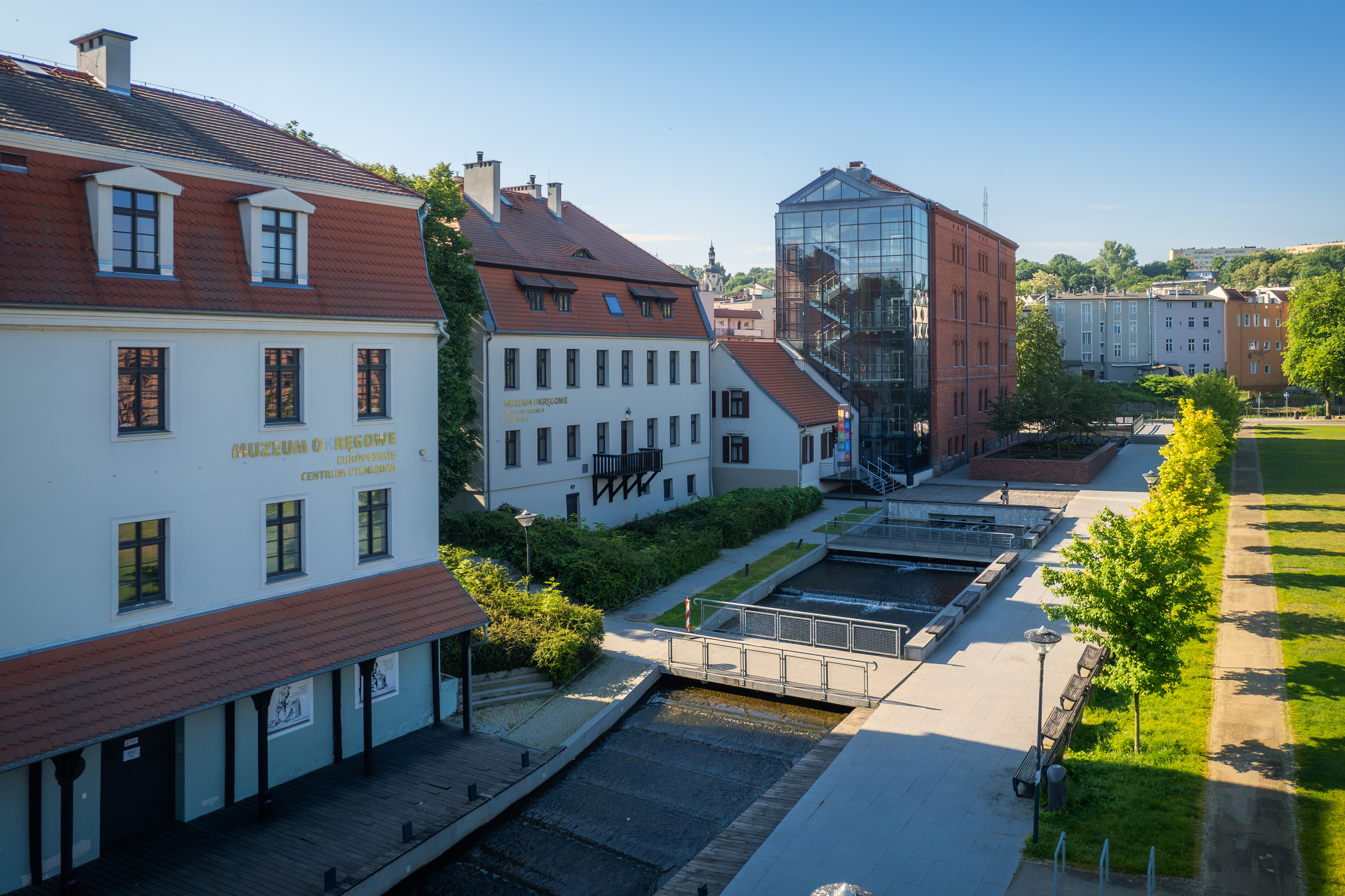
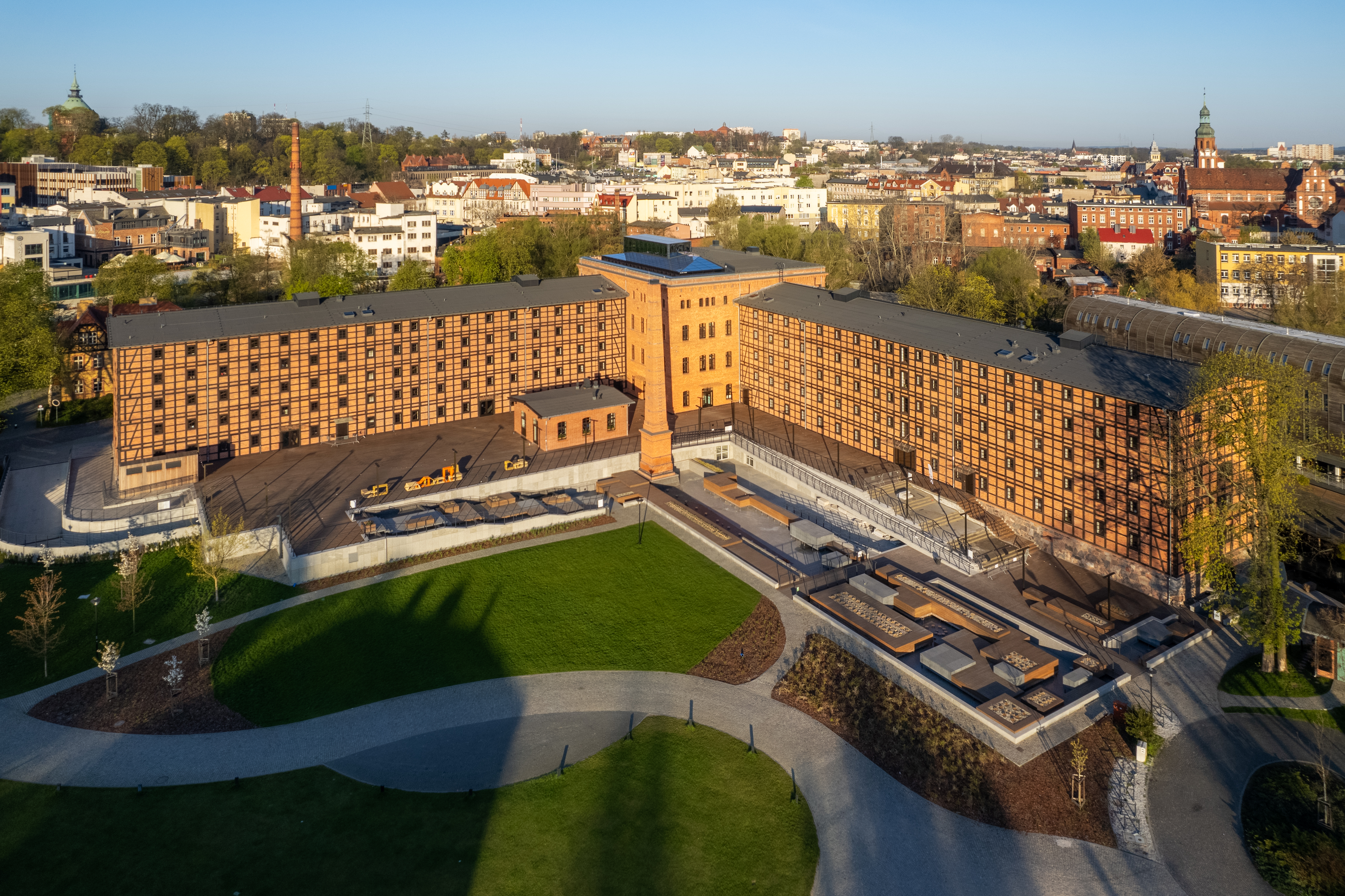
Postindustrial landscape of Mill Island is today a home to many museum and cultural facilities.

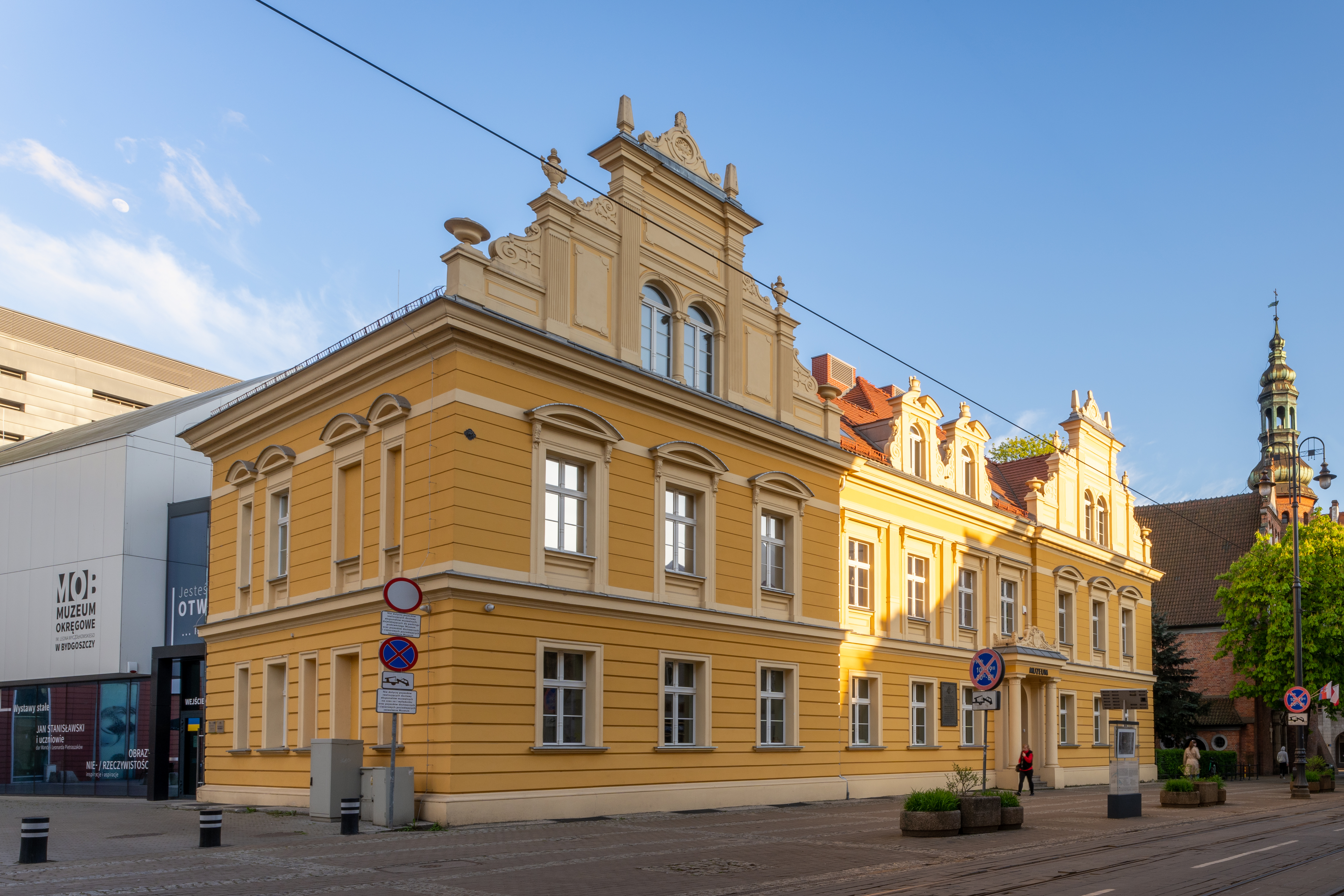
The seat of Leon Wyczółkowski Regional Museum, originally a 17th-century nunnery.

Muzeum Okręgowe im. Leona Wyczółkowskiego (Leon Wyczółkowski District Museum) is a municipally owned museum. Apart from a large collection of Leon Wyczółkowski's works, it houses permanent as well as temporary exhibitions of art. It is based in several buildings, including the old granaries on the Brda River and Mill Island and the remaining building of the Polish royal mint. Exploseum, a museum built around the World War II Nazi Germany munitions factory, is also part of it.

In Bydgoszcz, the Pomeranian Military Museum specializes in documenting 19th- and 20th-century Polish military history, particularly the history of the Pomeranian Military District and several other units present in the area.

The city has many art galleries, two symphony orchestras, many chamber orchestras and choirs. Bydgoszcz's cultural facilities also include libraries, including the Provincial and Municipal Public Library with an extensive collection of volumes from the 15th to the 19th centuries. The municipally owned Palaces and park ensemble in Ostromecko near the city contains the Andrzej Szwalbe Collection of Historical Pianos, one of the largest such collections in Poland.

=== Classical music ===
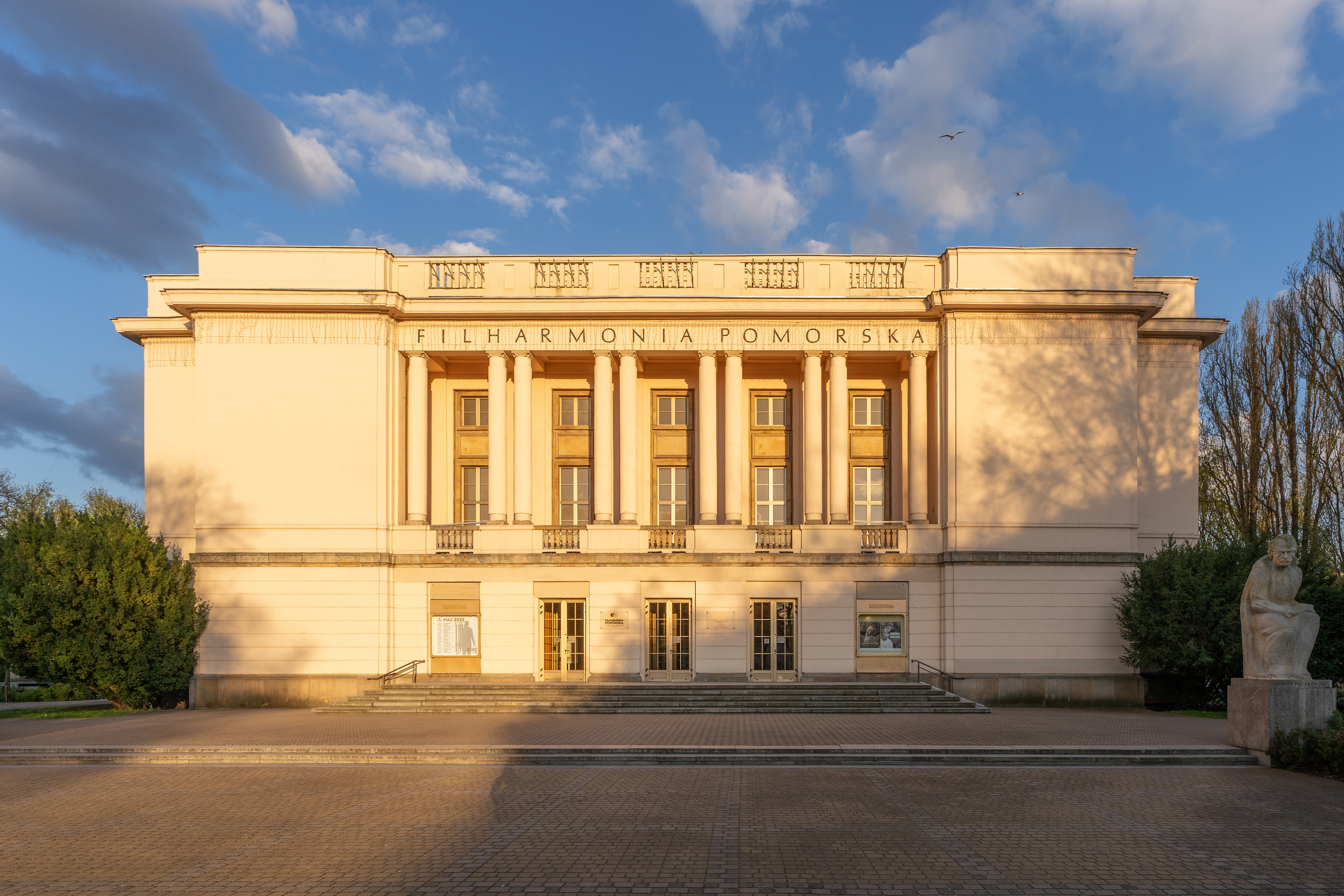
Pomeranian Philharmonic Orchestra House

- The Pomeranian Philharmonic performance home with full name Filharmonia Pomorska im. Ignacego Paderewskiego (Ignacy Paderewski's [Concert Hall]) includes its 880-seat main hall, the Arthur Rubinstein Hall, a key European, rectangular, concert hall with superb acoustic qualities, still mainly hosting all types of classical music. The International Paderewski Piano Competition is held there every three years.

=== Popular music ===
- Concerts of popular music in Bydgoszcz are usually held in Filharmonia Pomorska, Łuczniczka, Zawisza and Polonia stadiums as well as open plains of Myslecinek's Rozopole on the outskirts of the city.
- Alternative music festival "Low Fi"
- Smooth Festival Złote Przeboje Bydgoszcz
- Eska Music Festival Bydgoszcz
- Hity na Czasie Festival Bydgoszcz
- Bydgoszcz Hit Festival

=== Theatre ===
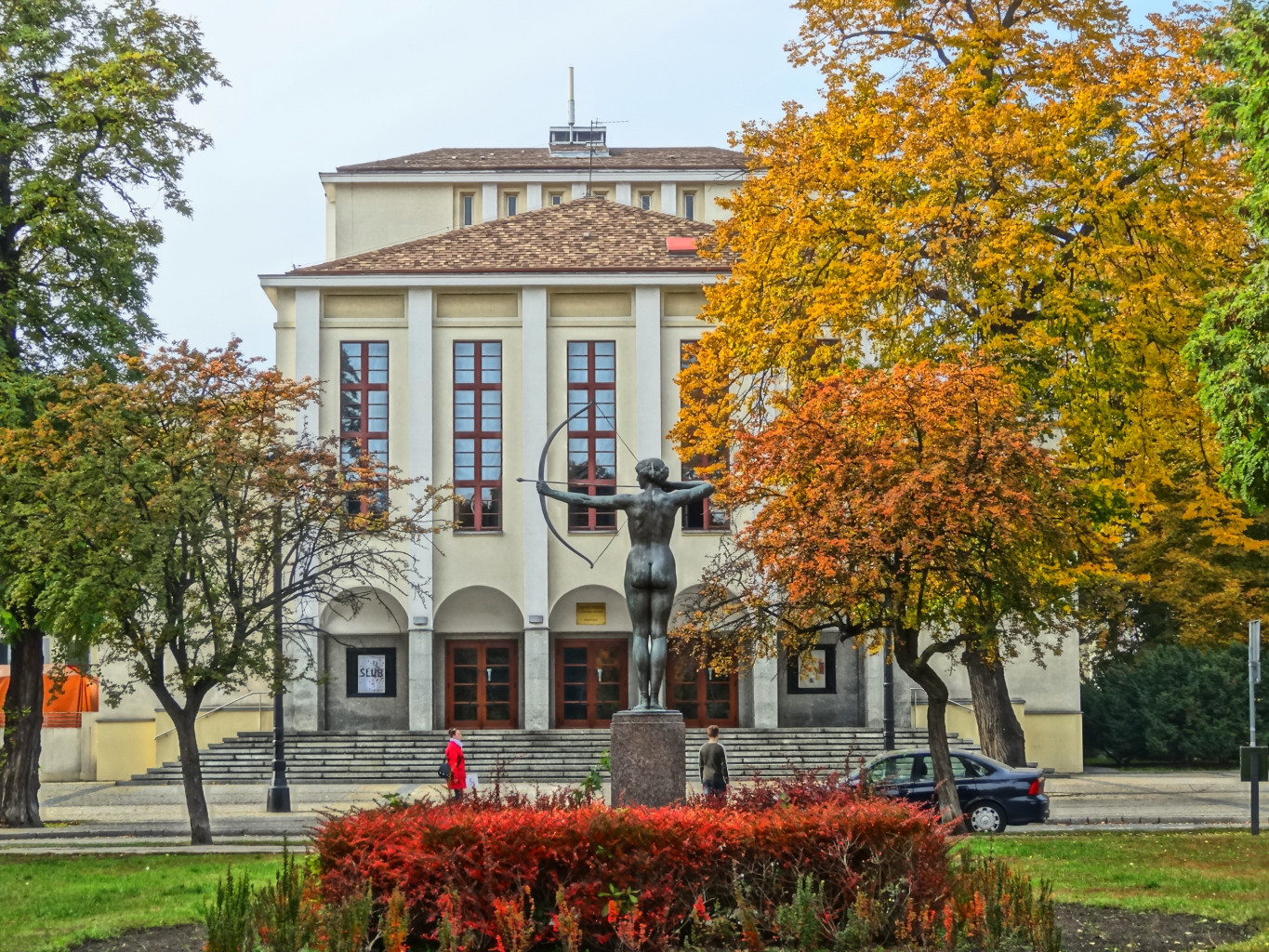
Polish Theatre in Bydgoszcz

Teatr Polski im Hieronima Konieczki (Hieronim Konieczka's Polish Theatre): Despite its name, the theatre offers a wide variety of shows both of national and foreign origin. It also regularly plays host to a large number of touring shows. Founded in 1949, since 2002 the theatre has taken part in the "Festival of Premieres" where the most renowned Polish theatres stage their latest works. There are also a number of private theatre companies operating in Bydgoszcz.

From 1960 to 1986, there was an outdoor theater, the reactivation of which is currently being pursued by the Theatre Culture Association, "Fides" and the Acting School A. Grzymala-Siedlecki.

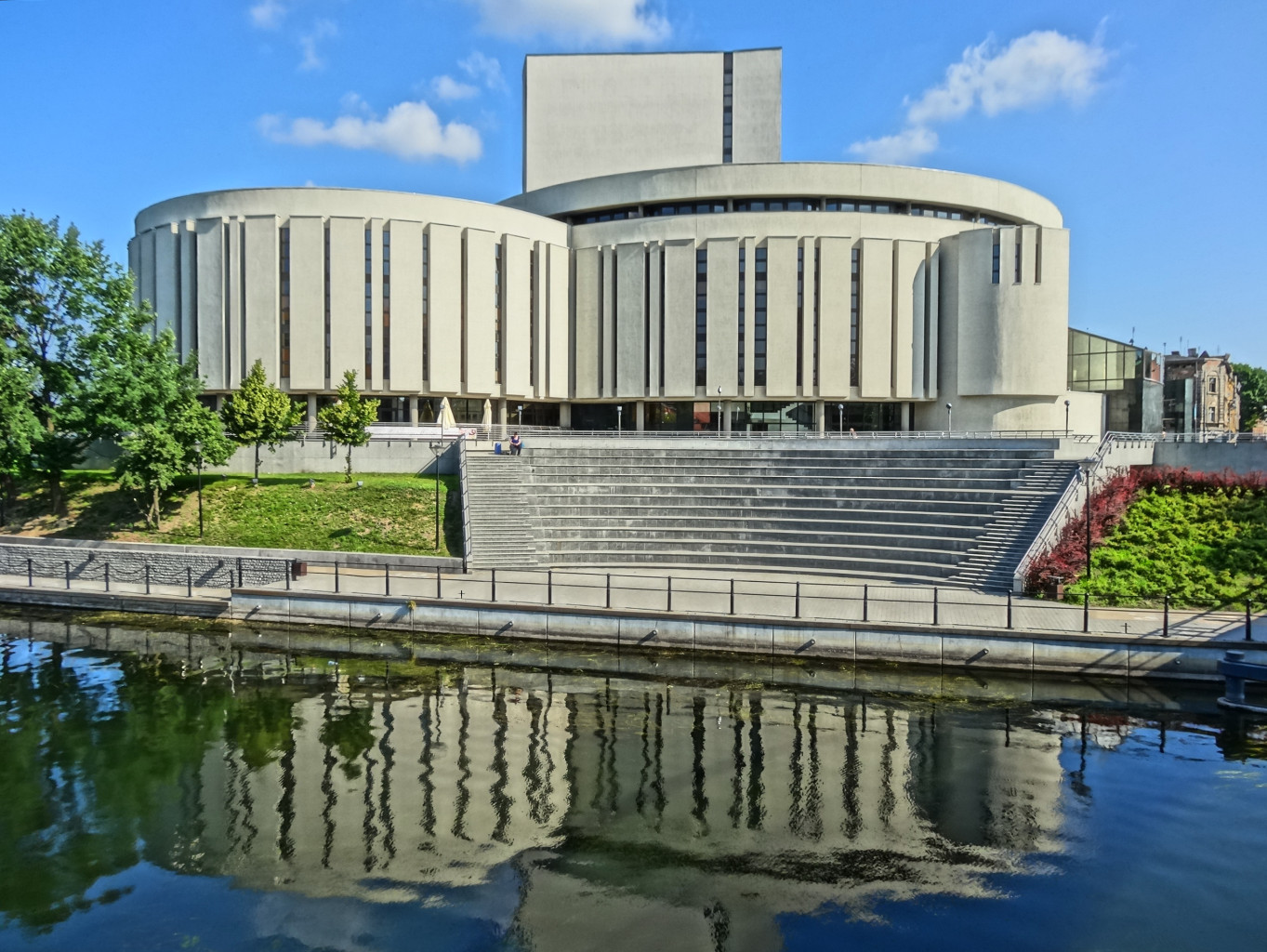
Opera Nova on the Brda River bank

The Pomeranian Philharmonic named after Ignacy Jan Paderewski has existed since 1953. The concert hall, which can hold 920 people is classified, in terms of sound, as one of the best in Europe, which is confirmed by well-known artists and critics (including Jerzy Waldorff). Due to the phenomenon of acoustics, it attracts the interest of many famous artists. Bydgoszcz's stage has been frequented by many global celebrities, including Arthur Rubinstein, Benjamin Britten, Witold Małcużyński, Luciano Pavarotti, Shlomo Mintz, Mischa Maisky, Kevin Kenner, Kurt Masur, Kazimierz Kord, Jerzy Maksymiuk and Antoni Wit. In recent years, the city has also hosted an excellent range of bands such as the BBC Radio Symphony Orchestra, the Polish National Radio Symphony Orchestra, and others.

The Opera Nova, in existence since 1956, started the construction of a new building in 1974 which was to consist of three main halls, situated on the Brda. The Opera Nova has become a cultural showcase of Bydgoszcz in the world. Considering the short history of the Opera, its success has been astounding; a large number of famous opera singers have performed there and theatrical troops from the Wrocław Opera, Theatre of Leningrad, Moscow, Kiev, Minsk, and Gulbenkian Foundation of Lisbon have also made appearances.

=== Cinematography ===
- The International Film Festival of the Art of Cinematography camerimage is a festival dedicated to cinematography and its creators cinematographers.

== Education ==
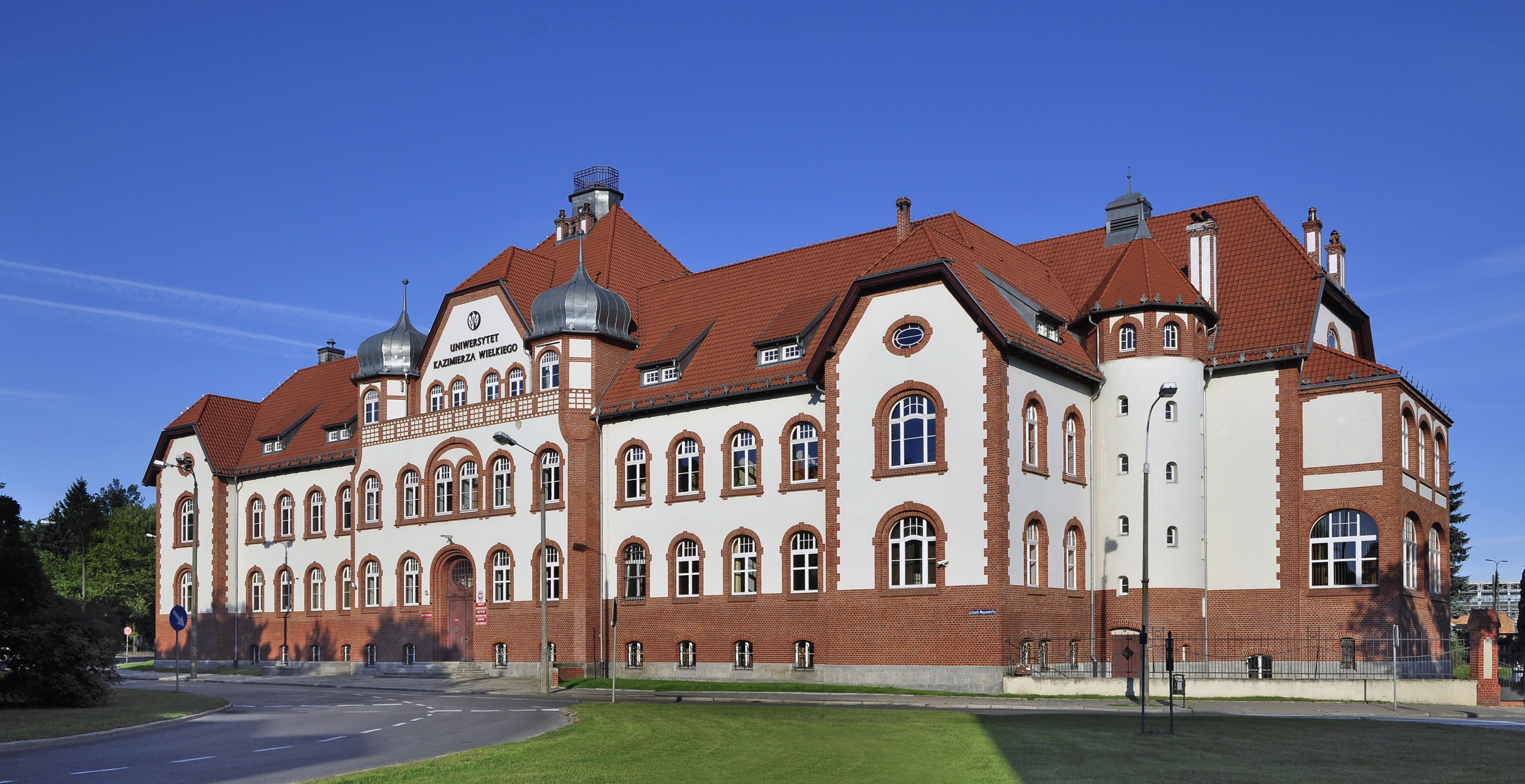
Kazimierz Wielki University in Bydgoszcz

- Kazimierz Wielki University
- University of Technology and Life Sciences in Bydgoszcz
- Bydgoszcz Music Academy - "Feliks Nowowiejski"
- University Collegium Medicum im. Ludwika Rydygiera (Uniwersytet Mikołaja Kopernika w Toruniu, Akademia Medyczna)
- Ośrodek Akademii Ekonomicznej w Poznaniu
- Sekcja Wydziału Teologicznego Uniwersytetu im. A. Mickiewicza w Poznaniu
- WSB Merito University in Toruń, department of Finance and Management
- Kujawsko-Pomorska Szkoła Wyższa
- Wyższa Szkoła Gospodarki
- Wyższa Szkoła Informatyki i Nauk Społeczno-Prawnych
- Wyższa Szkoła Środowiska
- Wyższa Szkoła Informatyki in Łódź, Branch in Bydgoszcz
- Nauczycielskie Kolegium Języków Obcych
- Niepubliczne Nauczycielskie Kolegium Języków Obcych

== Transport ==
=== Airports ===
- Bydgoszcz Ignacy Jan Paderewski Airport

=== Rail ===
Bydgoszcz is one of the biggest railway junctions in Poland, with two important lines crossing there – the east–west connection from Toruń to Pila and the north–south line from Inowrocław to Gdańsk (see: Polish Coal Trunk-Line). There are also secondary-importance lines stemming from the city, to Szubin and to Chełmża. Among rail stations located in the city, there are:

- Bydgoszcz Główna – main station
- Bydgoszcz Leśna
- Bydgoszcz Wschód
- Bydgoszcz Zachód
- Bydgoszcz Łęgnowo
- Bydgoszcz Bielawy
- Bydgoszcz Osowa Góra
- Bydgoszcz Fordon

=== Buses and trams ===
- Local buses and trams are operated by Zarząd Dróg Miejskich i Komunikacji Publicznej w Bydgoszczy
- PKS Bydgoszcz – operates inter-city and international bus routes.
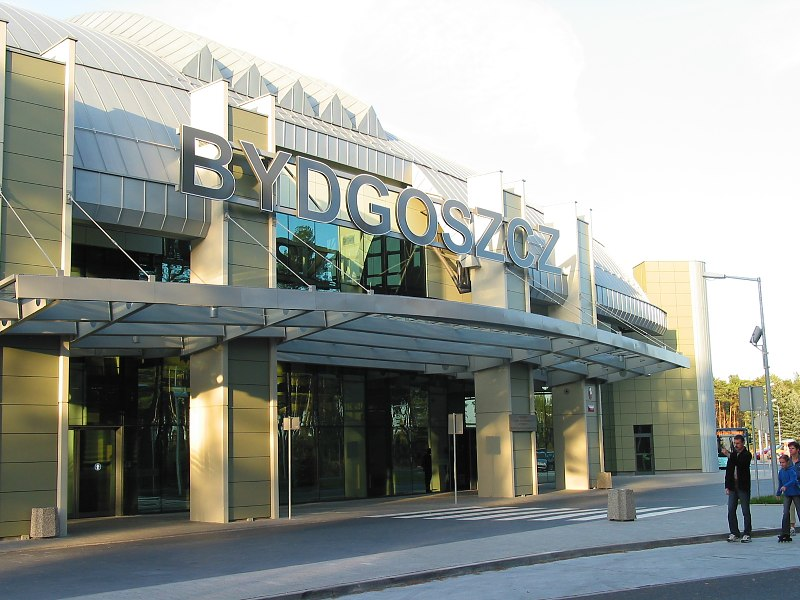
Bydgoszcz Ignacy Jan Paderewski Airport

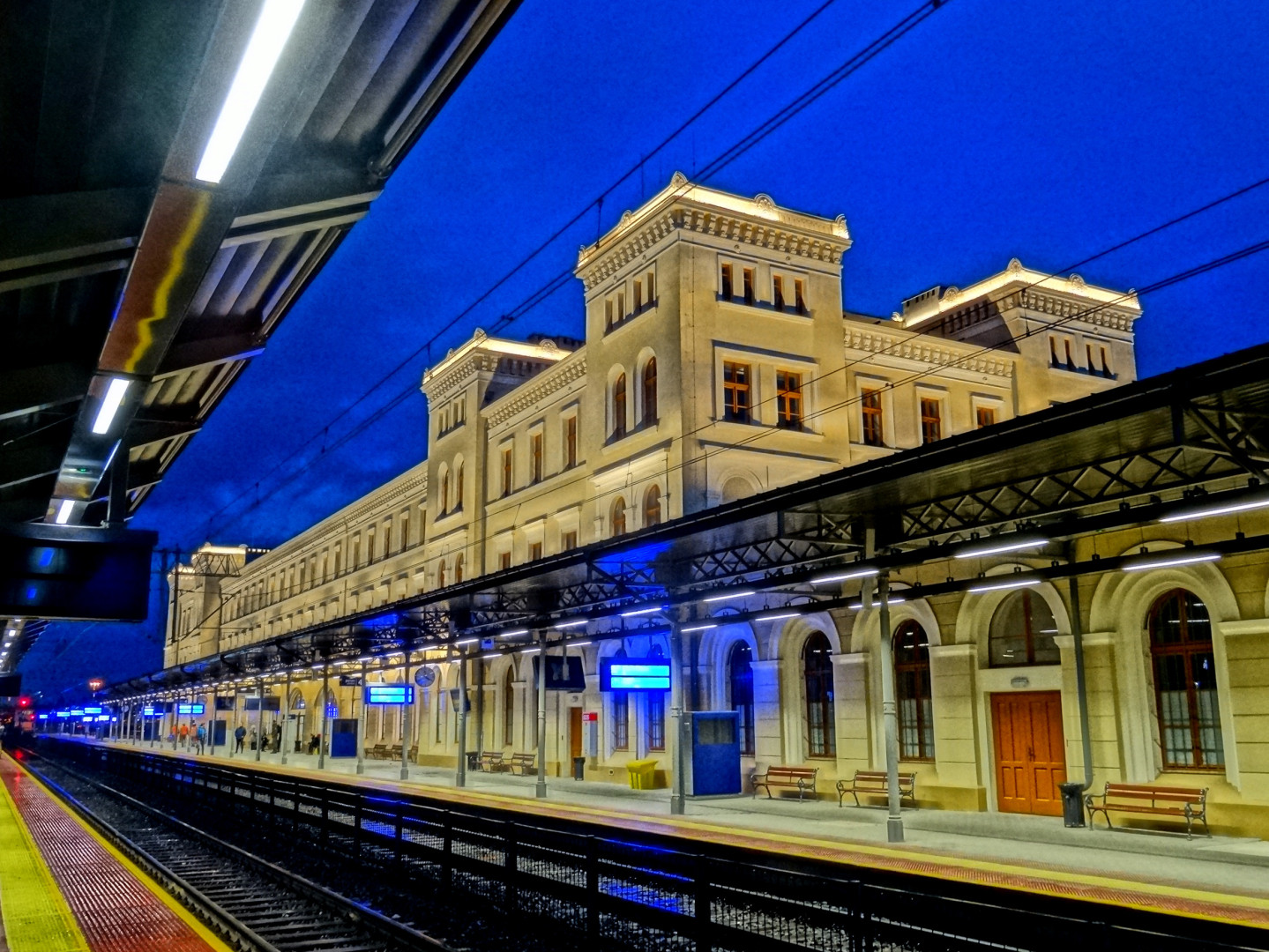
Historic main railway station in Bydgoszcz

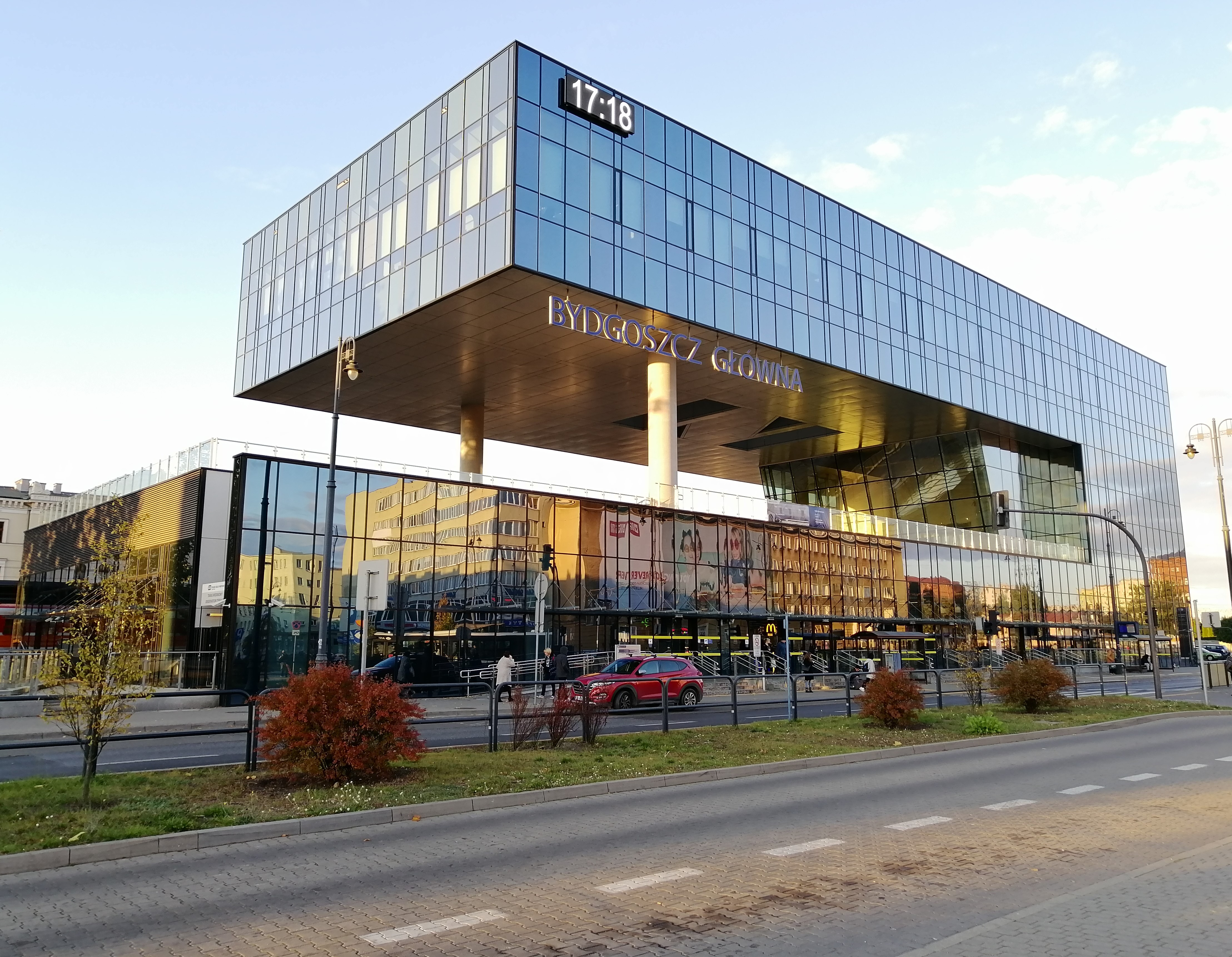
Modern part of the main railway station

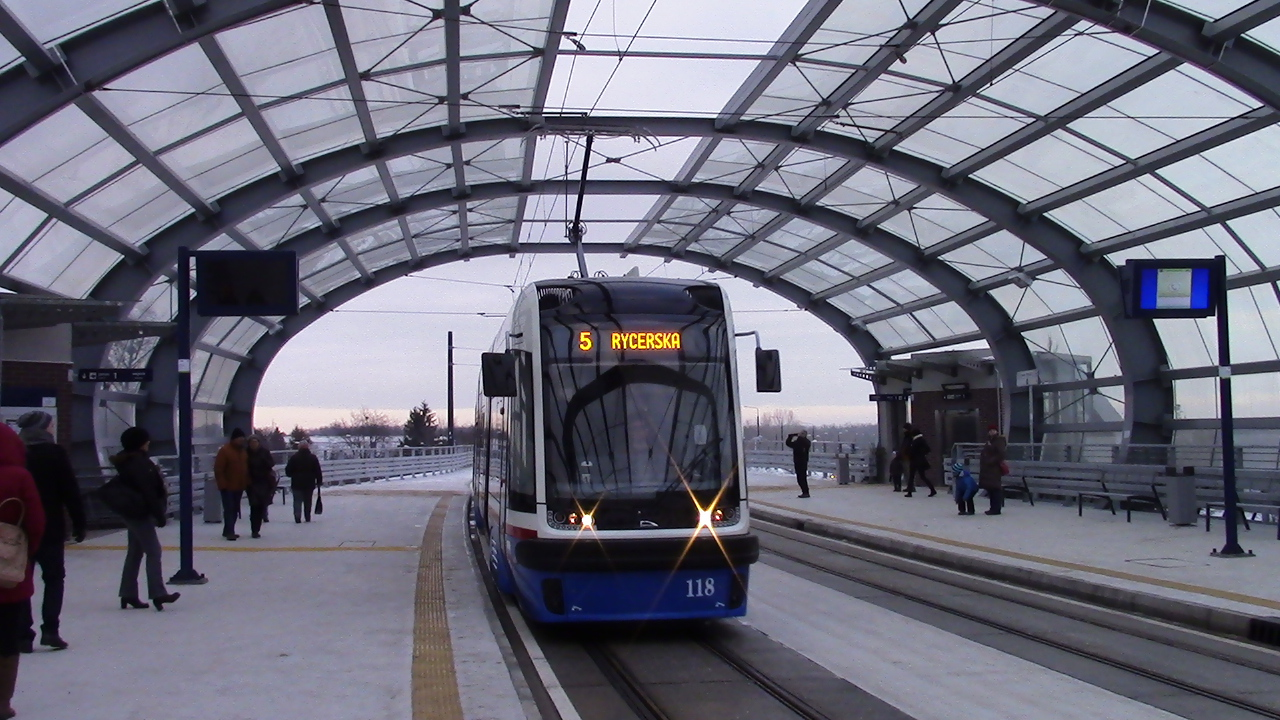
Tram in Bydgoszcz

== Sports ==
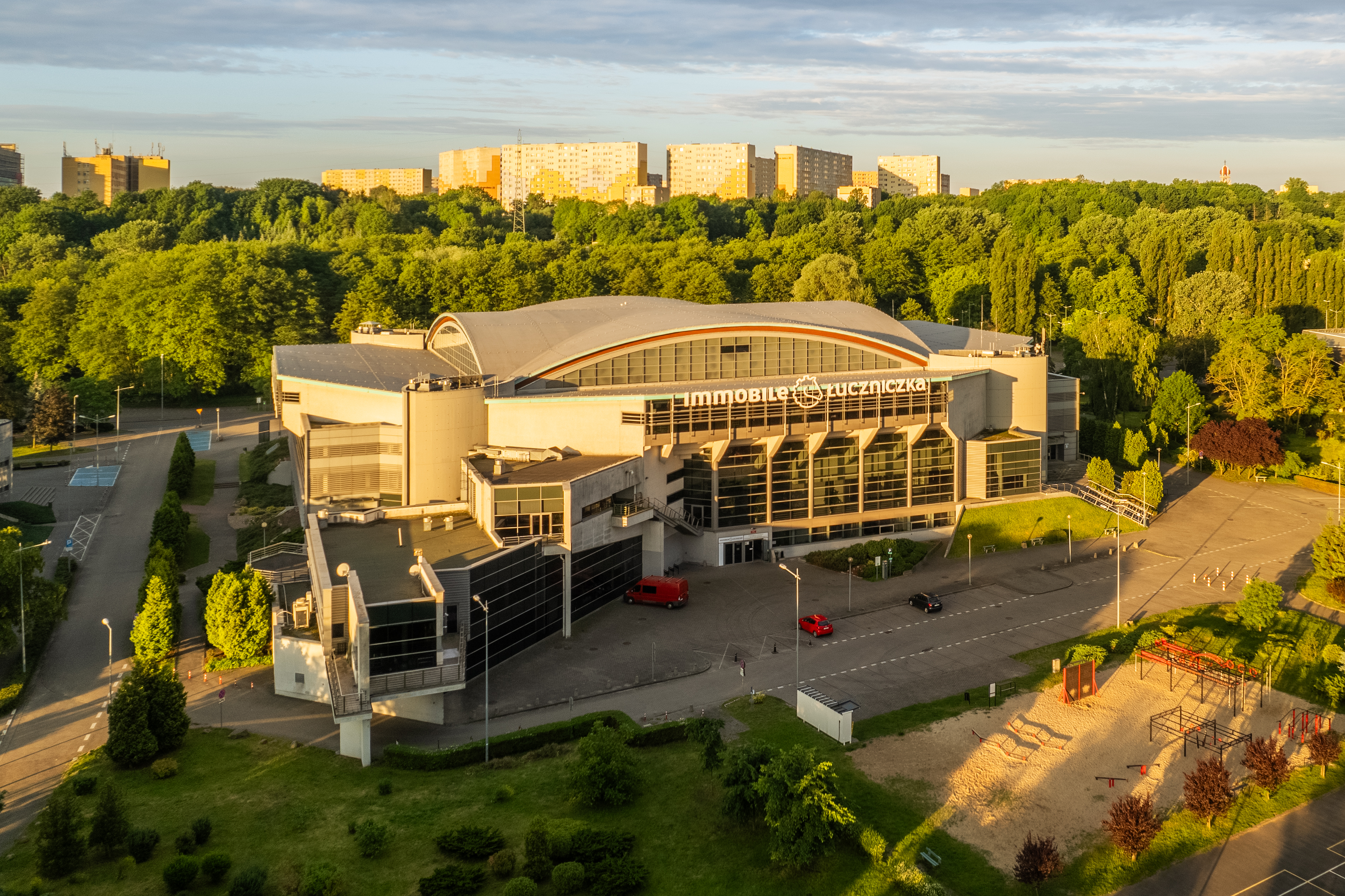
The sport, show and fair arena Łuczniczka.

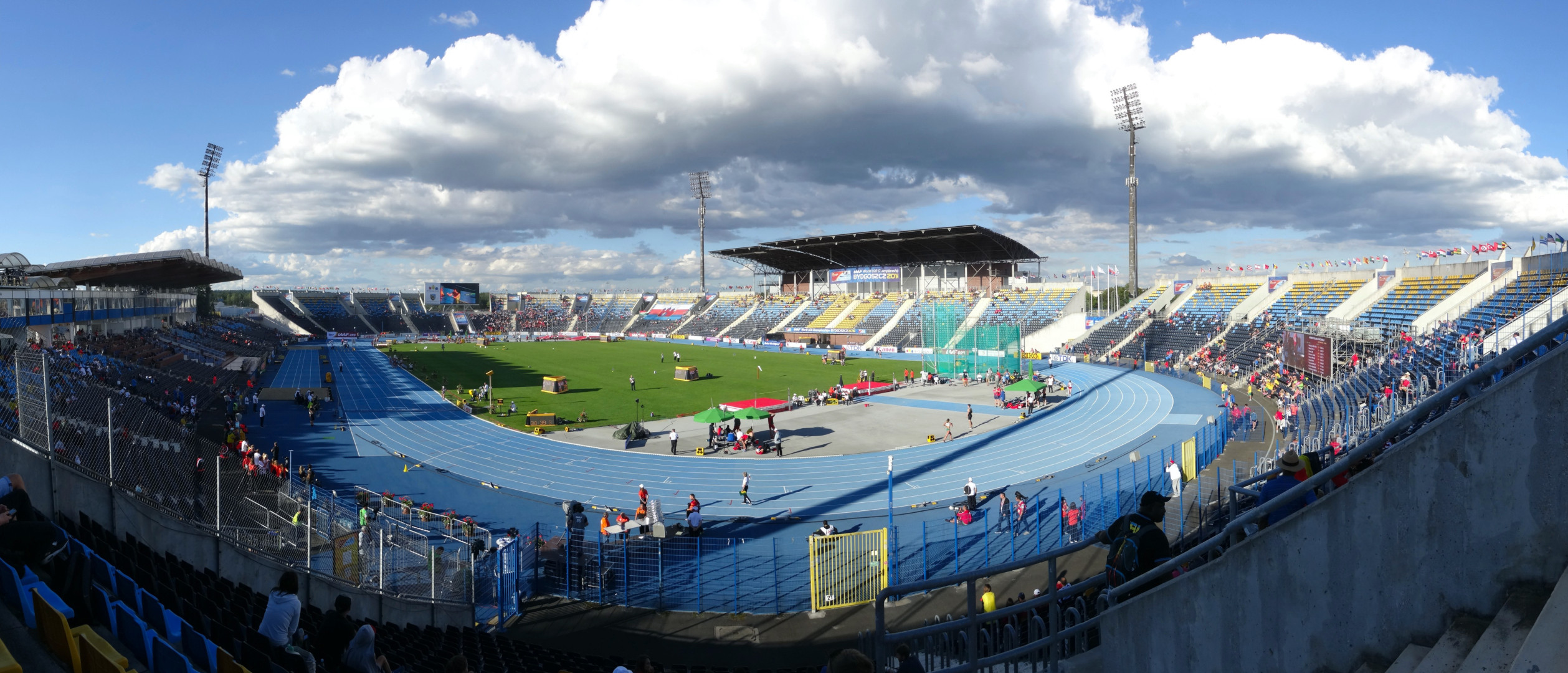
Zdzisław Krzyszkowiak Stadium

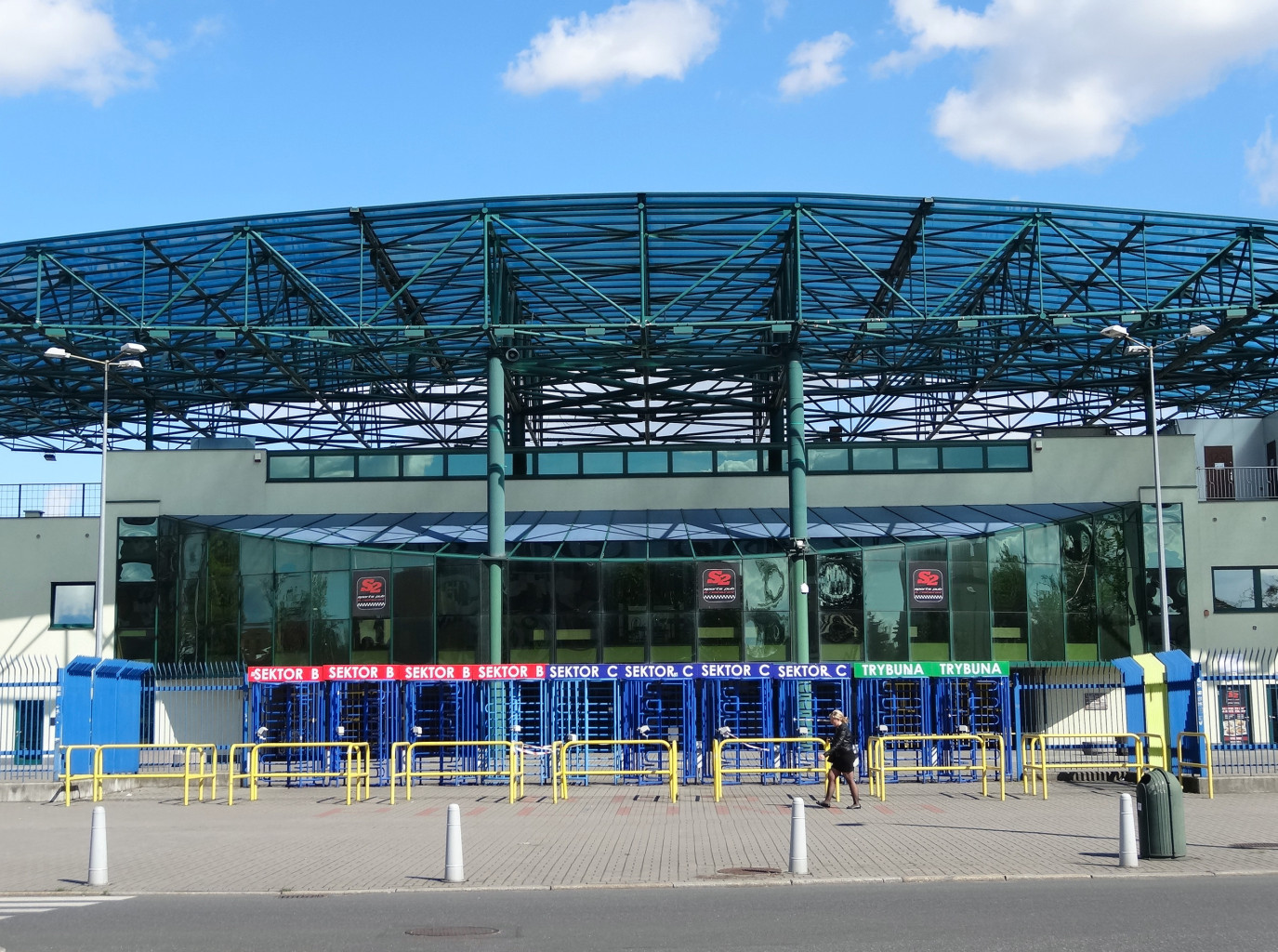
Józef Piłsudski Municipal Stadium

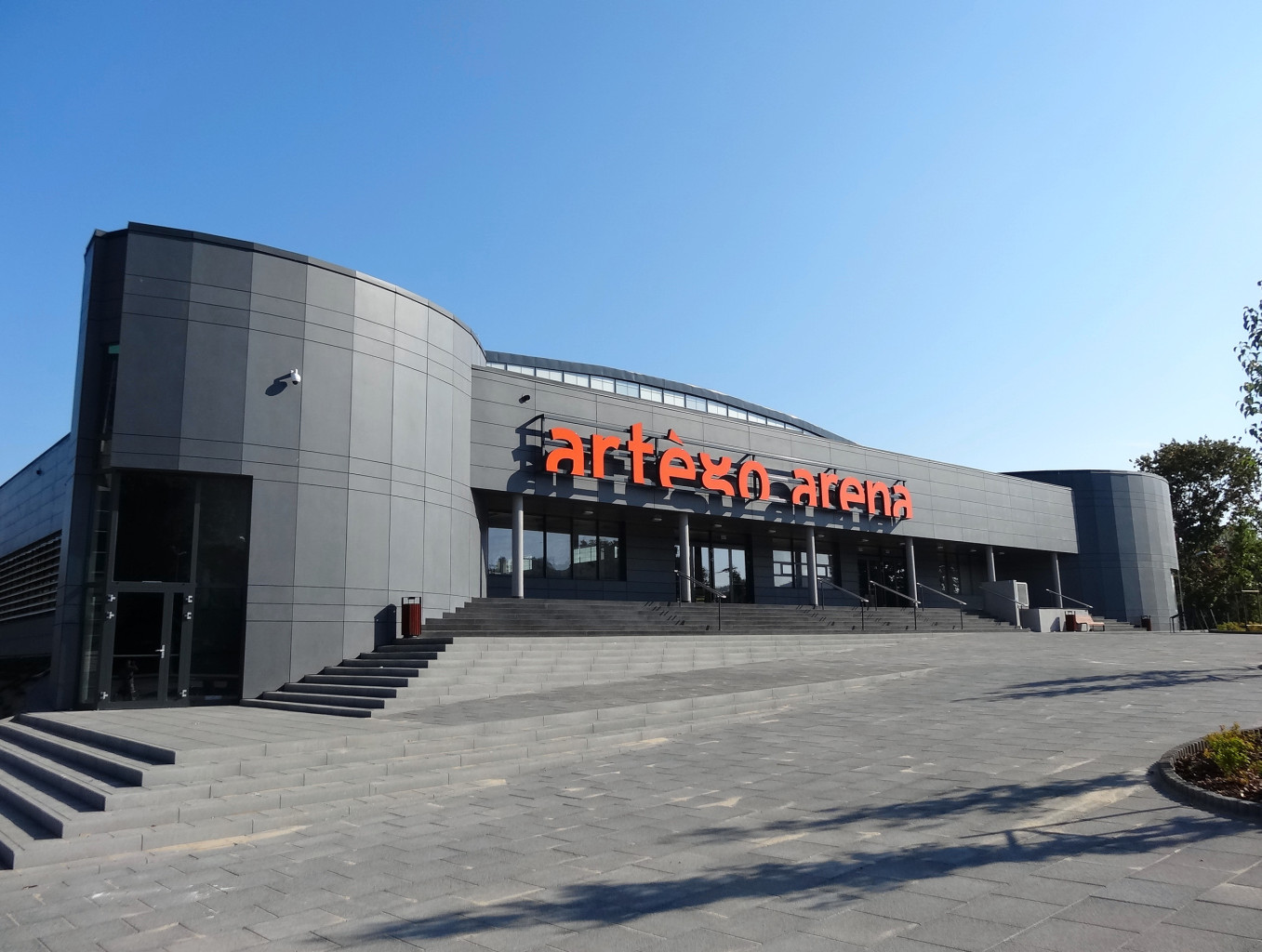
Grupa Moderator Arena (formerly called Artego Arena and Sisu Arena)

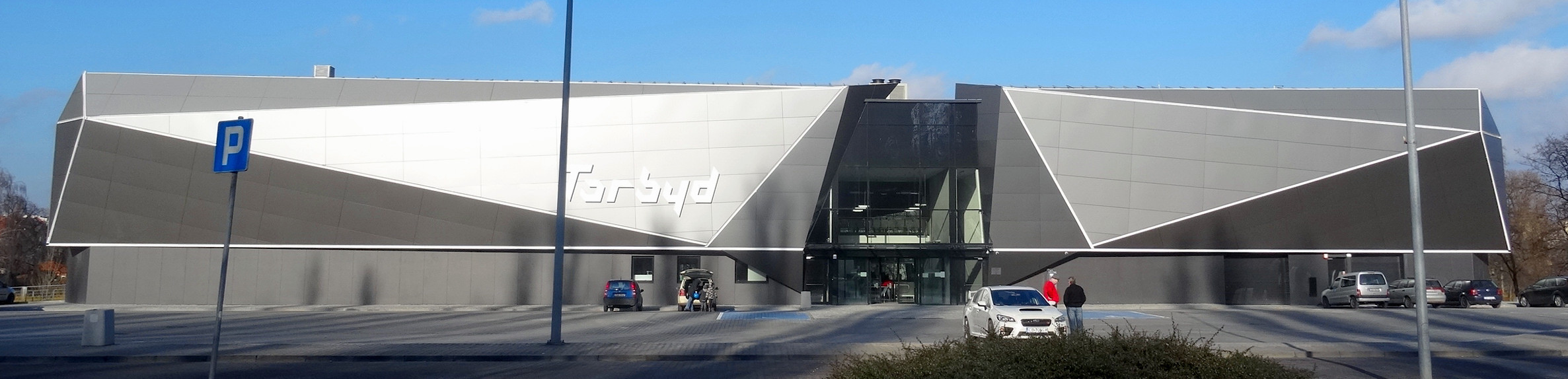
Torbyd

=== Sports clubs ===
- Basket 25 Bydgoszcz – women's basketball team playing in Basket Liga Kobiet, the country's top division.
- Astoria Bydgoszcz – men's basketball team playing in Polish Basketball League, the country's top division (as of 2022–23).
- Bydgoszcz Archers – American football team playing in Polish Football League, the country's top division.
- Pałac Bydgoszcz – women's volleyball team playing in Polish Women's Volleyball League, the country's top division.
- BKS Visła Bydgoszcz – men's volleyball team playing in Polish Volleyball League, the country's top division.
- KKP Bydgoszcz – women's football team playing in Ekstraliga, the country's top division.
- Chemik Bydgoszcz – men's football team playing in the country's lower league.
- Polonia Bydgoszcz – speedway team, seven-time Polish League champions (lately in 2002) and three-time European Speedway Club Champions' (lately in 2001) and football team, which played in the top tier in the 1950s and 1960s.
- Zawisza Bydgoszcz – football team, which played in the past in the country's top flight, most recently in 2015, currently playing in the lower league.
- RTW Bydgostia Bydgoszcz – Rowing (sport) Bydgostia Regional Rowing Association was founded on 4 December 1928. The club was A Team Polish Champion in the following years: 1938, 1966, 1967, 1970 and for the successive seventeen years from 1993 to 2009.
- Gwiazda Bydgoszcz – men's table tennis team playing in Superliga, the country's top division. The club is also successfully competing in table tennis Europe Cup.

=== Sports facilities ===
- Łuczniczka, Show and Fair Arena
- Grupa Moderator Arena, a closed indoor arena
- Zdzisław Krzyszkowiak Stadium
- Polonia Stadium
- Hala Torbyd, a closed indoor arena

=== Sports events ===
- Athletics
  - 2003 European Athletics U23 Championships
  - 2008 World Junior Championships in Athletics
  - 2010 IAAF World Cross Country Championships
  - 2013 IAAF World Cross Country Championships
  - 2016 World Junior Championships in Athletics
  - 2017 European Athletics U23 Championships
  - 2019 European Team Championships
  - European Athletics Festival Bydgoszcz (annual event part of the European Permit Meetings circuit)
- Speedway
  - Grand Prix of Poland: (1998–1999, 2001–2009)
  - Grand Prix of Europe: (2000)
  - Mieczysław Połukard Criterium of Polish Speedway Leagues Aces (1951–1960, since 1982)
- Team sports
  - Eurobasket 2009
  - Women's European Volleyball Championships 2009
  - 2019 FIFA U-20 World Cup

== Politics ==
=== Bydgoszcz constituency ===
Members of Polish Sejm 2007–2011 elected from Bydgoszcz constituency:

- Anna Bańkowska, Left and Democrats
- Krzysztof Brejza, Civic Platform
- Jarosław Katulski, Civic Platform
- Eugeniusz Kłopotek, Polish People's Party
- Tomasz Latos, Law and Justice
- Wojciech Mojzesowicz, Law and Justice
- Paweł Olszewski, Civic Platform
- Teresa Piotrowska, Civic Platform
- Grzegorz Roszak, Civic Platform
- Radosław Sikorski, Civic Platform
- Andrzej Walkowiak, Law and Justice
- Janusz Zemke, Left and Democrats

Members of Polish Senate 2007–2011 elected from Bydgoszcz constituency:

- Zbigniew Pawłowicz, Civic Platform
- Jan Rulewski, Civic Platform

== International relations ==
=== Consulates ===
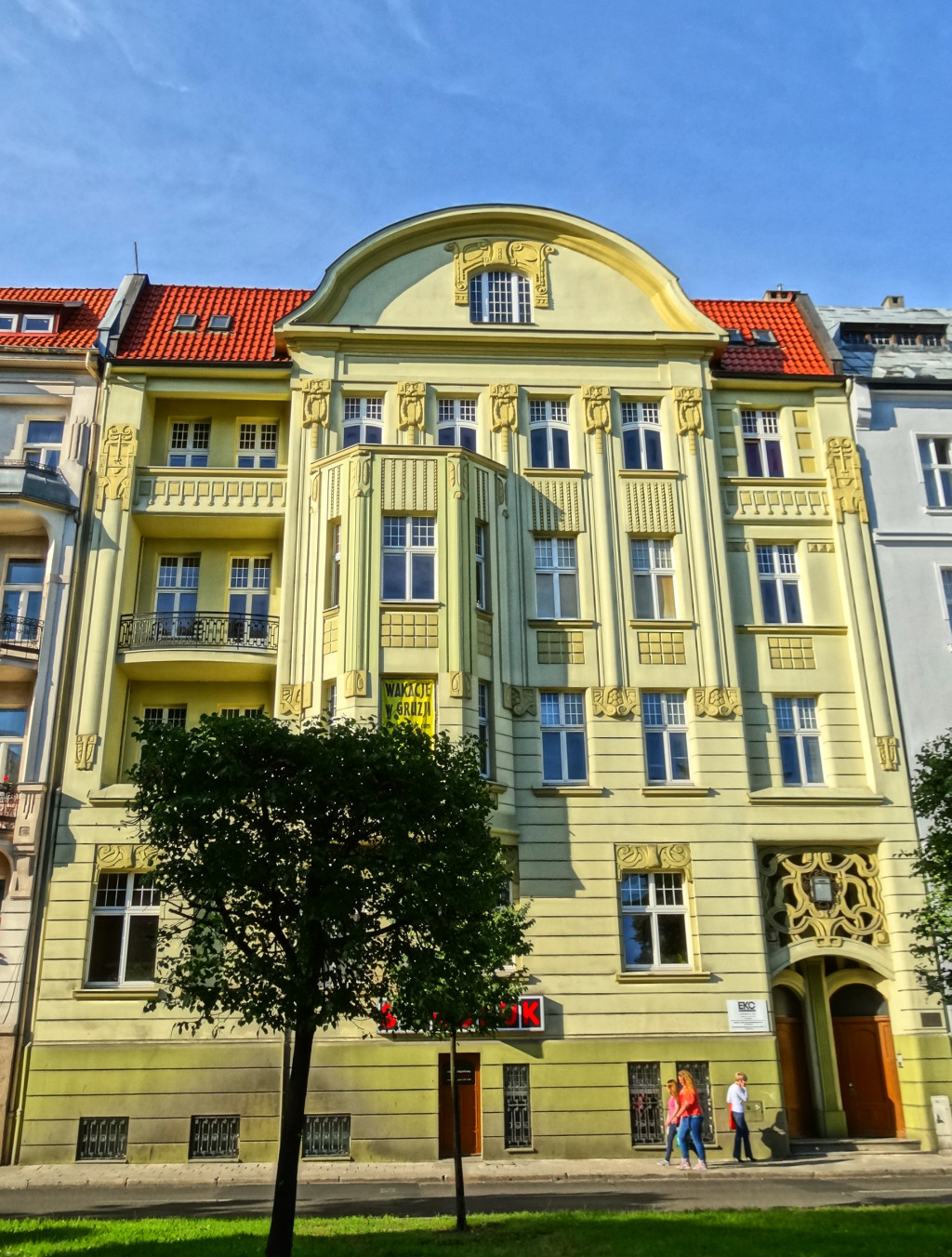
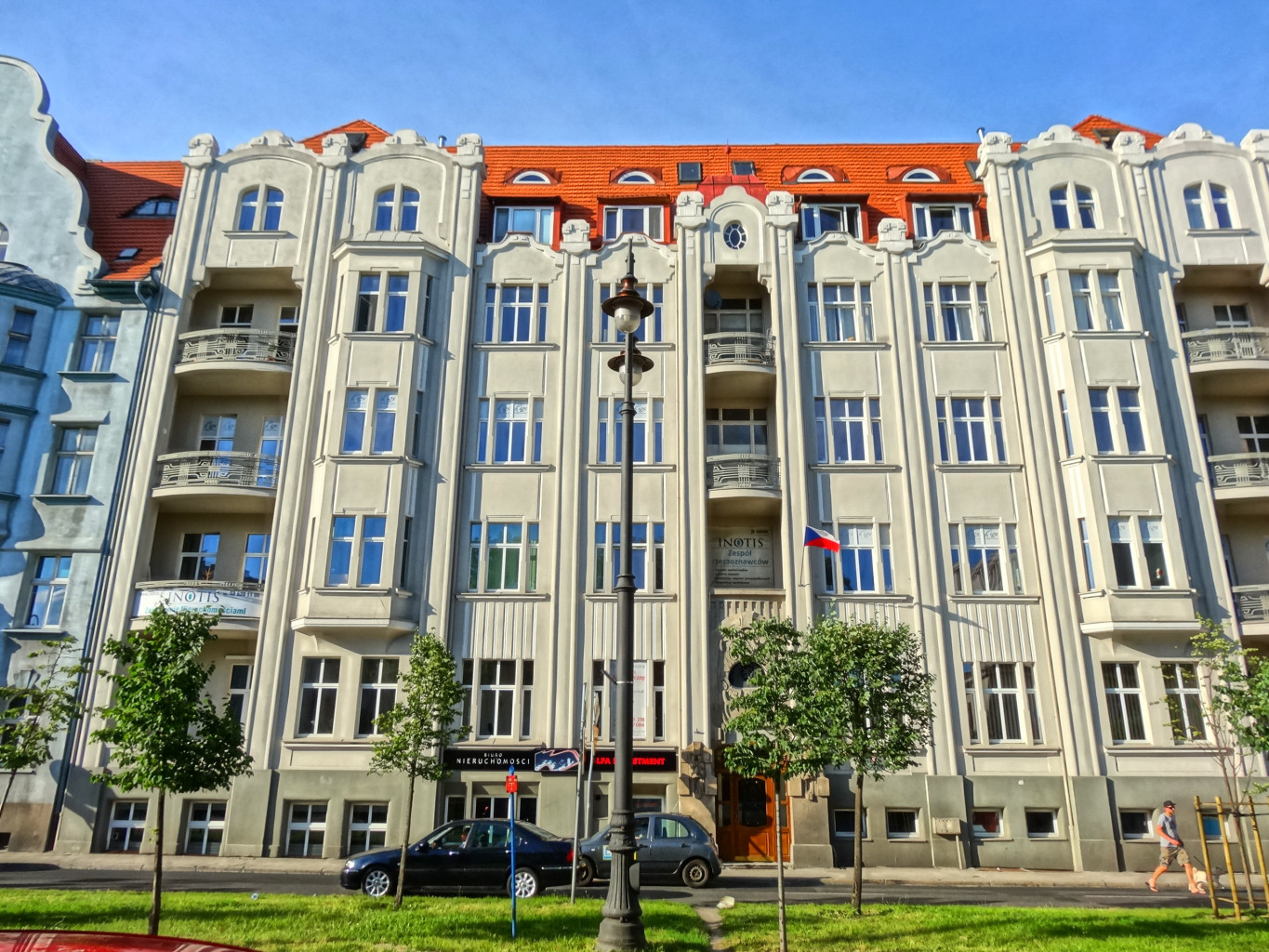
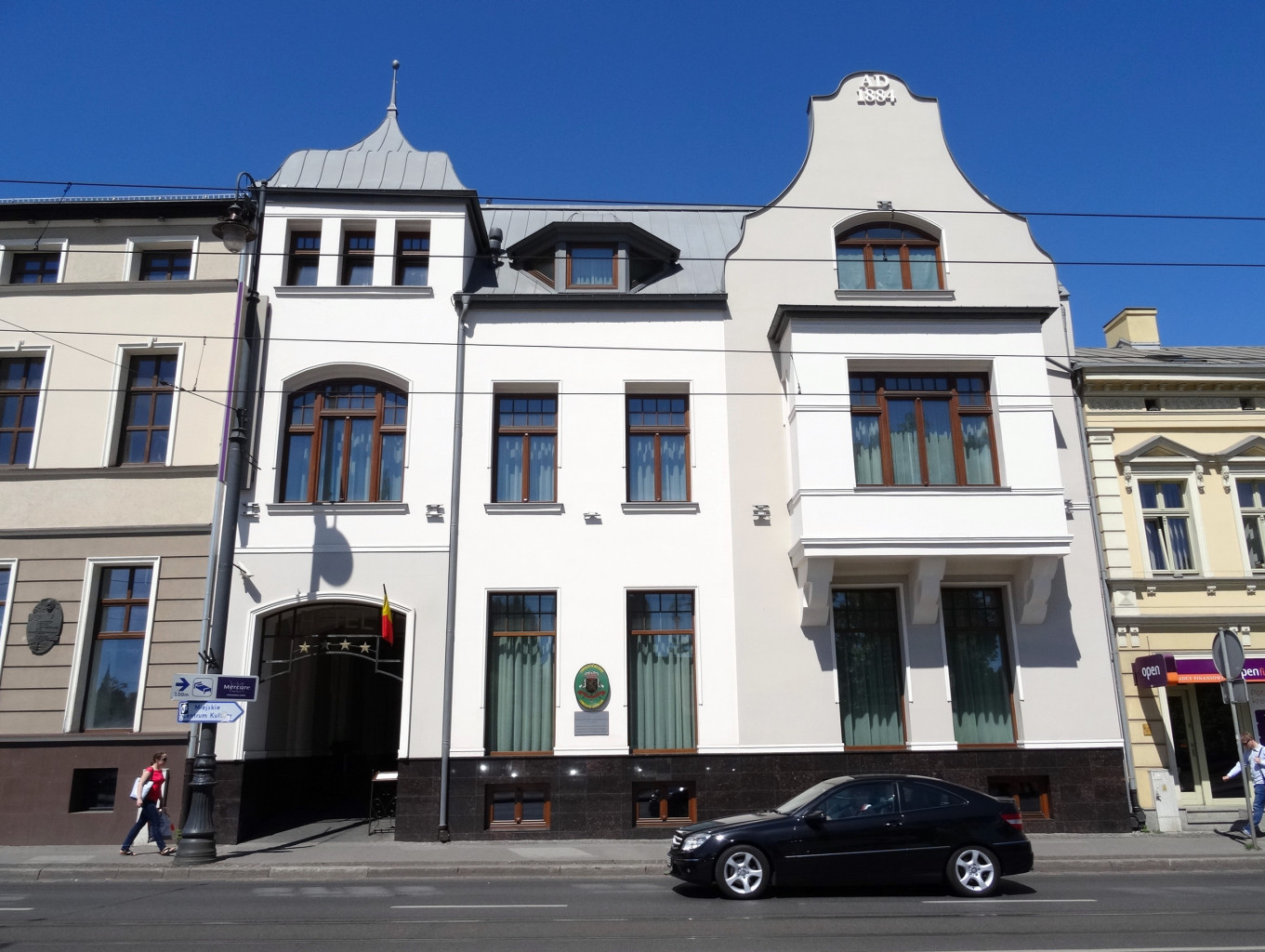
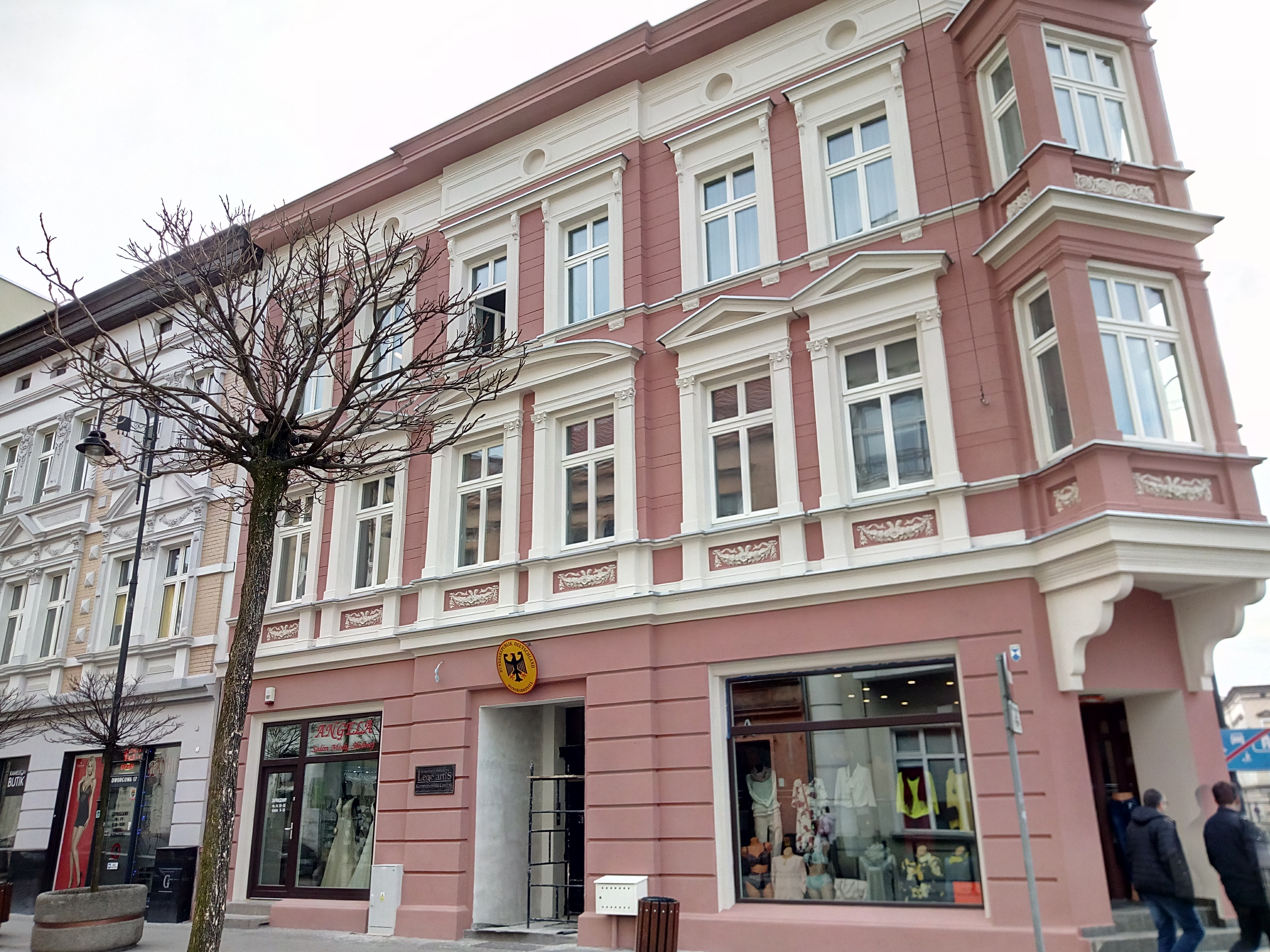
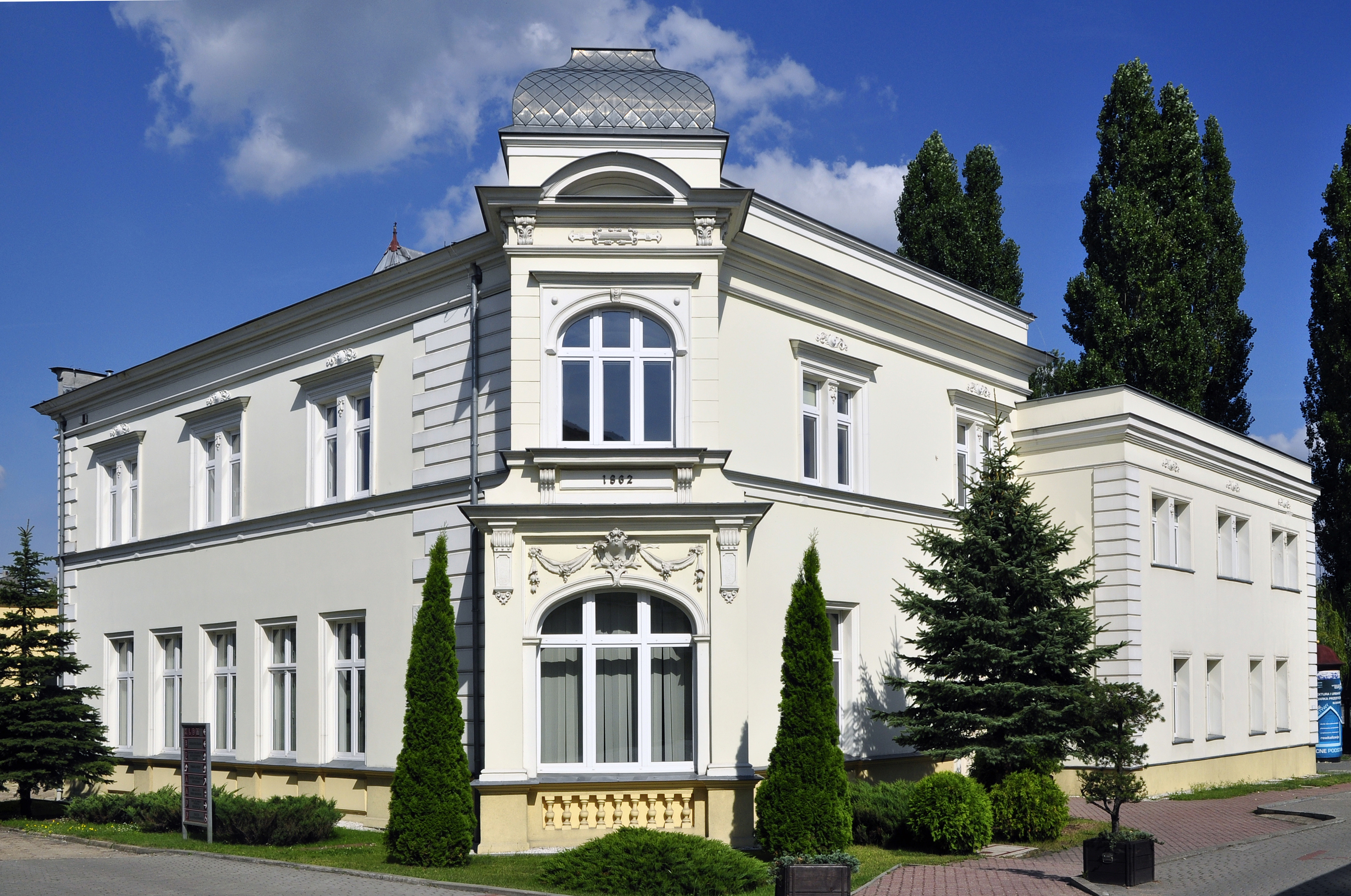
From top, left to right: honorary consulates of Austria, of Czechia, of Belgium, of Germany, and of Slovakia, Ukraine and Montenegro

There is an Honorary Consulate General of Hungary in Bydgoszcz, and nine honorary consulates, of Austria, Belgium, Croatia, Czech Republic, Germany, Montenegro, Serbia, Slovakia and Ukraine.

=== Twin towns and friendship relations ===
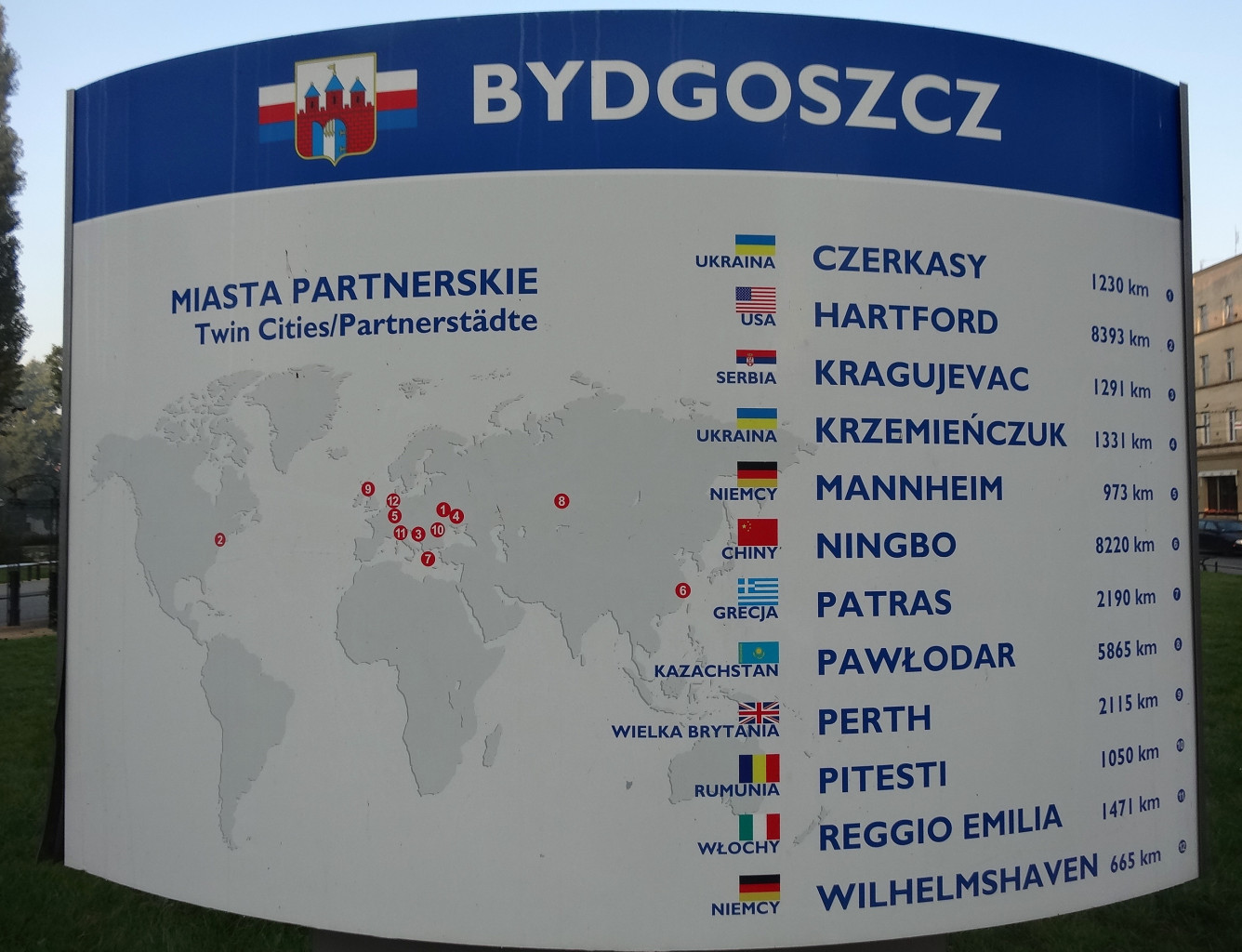
Twin town signs of Bydgoszcz

Twin Towns
City/Town	Country	Year
Reggio Emilia	Italy	12.04.1962
Kragujevac	Serbia	23.07.1971
Mannheim	Germany	26.11.1991
Hartford	United States	30.09.1996
Pavlodar	Kazakhstan	10.04.1997
Perth	United Kingdom	9.05.1998
Cherkasy	Ukraine	13.09.2000
Kremenchuk	Ukraine	30.06.2004
Patras	Greece	8.10.2004
Ningbo	China	28.12.2005
Wilhelmshaven	Germany	19.04.2006
Pitești	Romania	22.06.2007
Sliven	Bulgaria	9.09.2019

== Gallery ==
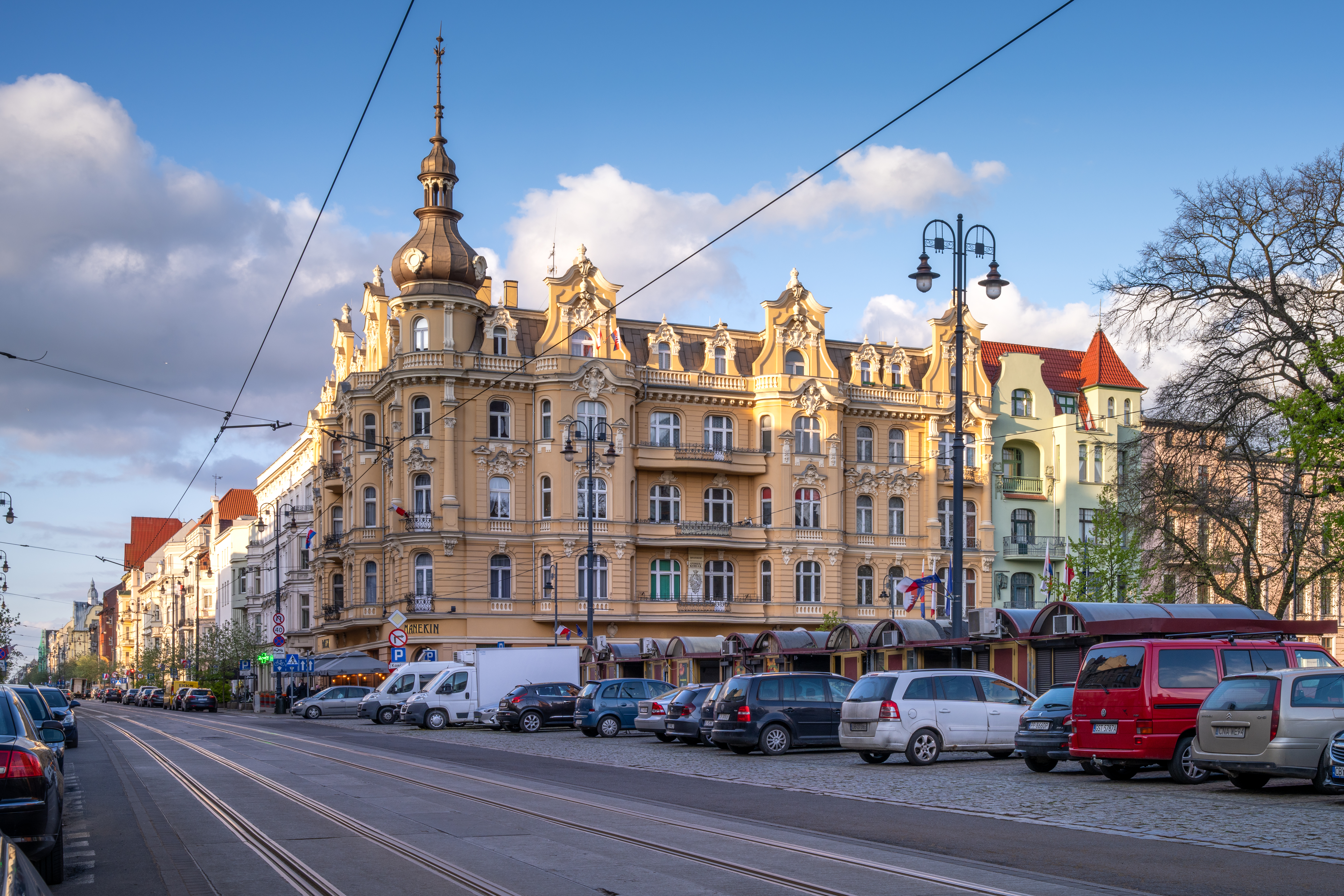
Gdańska Street

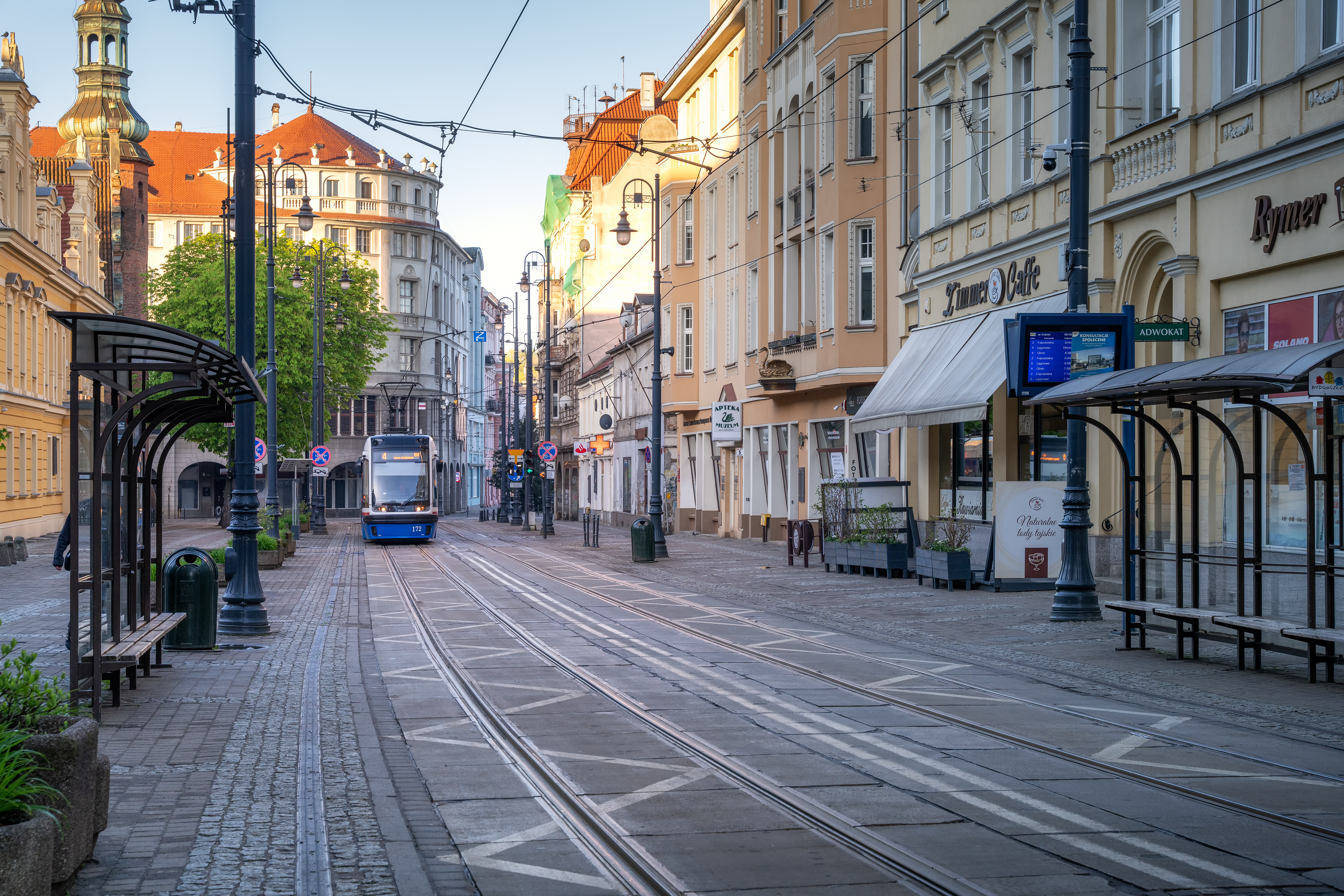
Gdańska Street

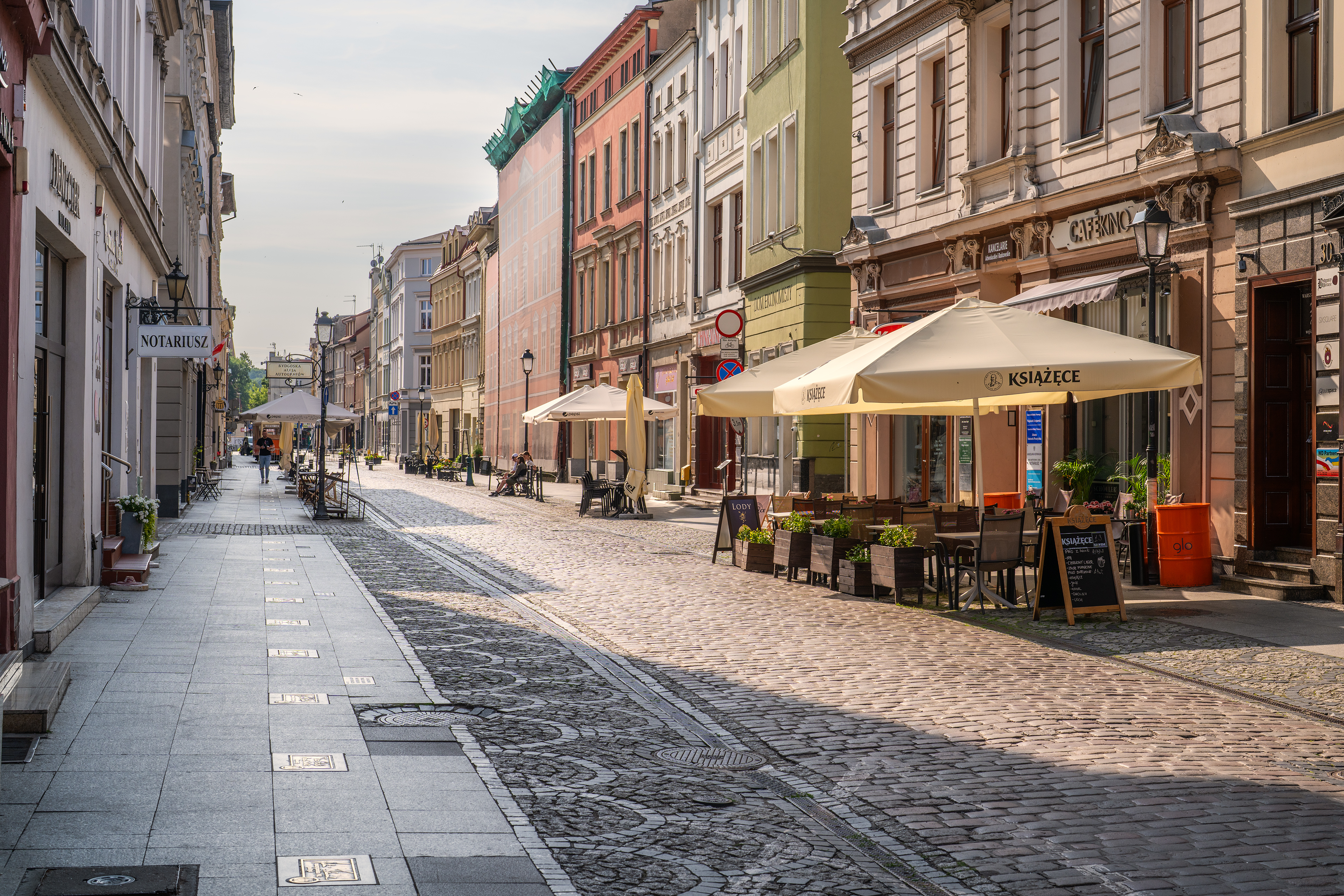
Długa Street

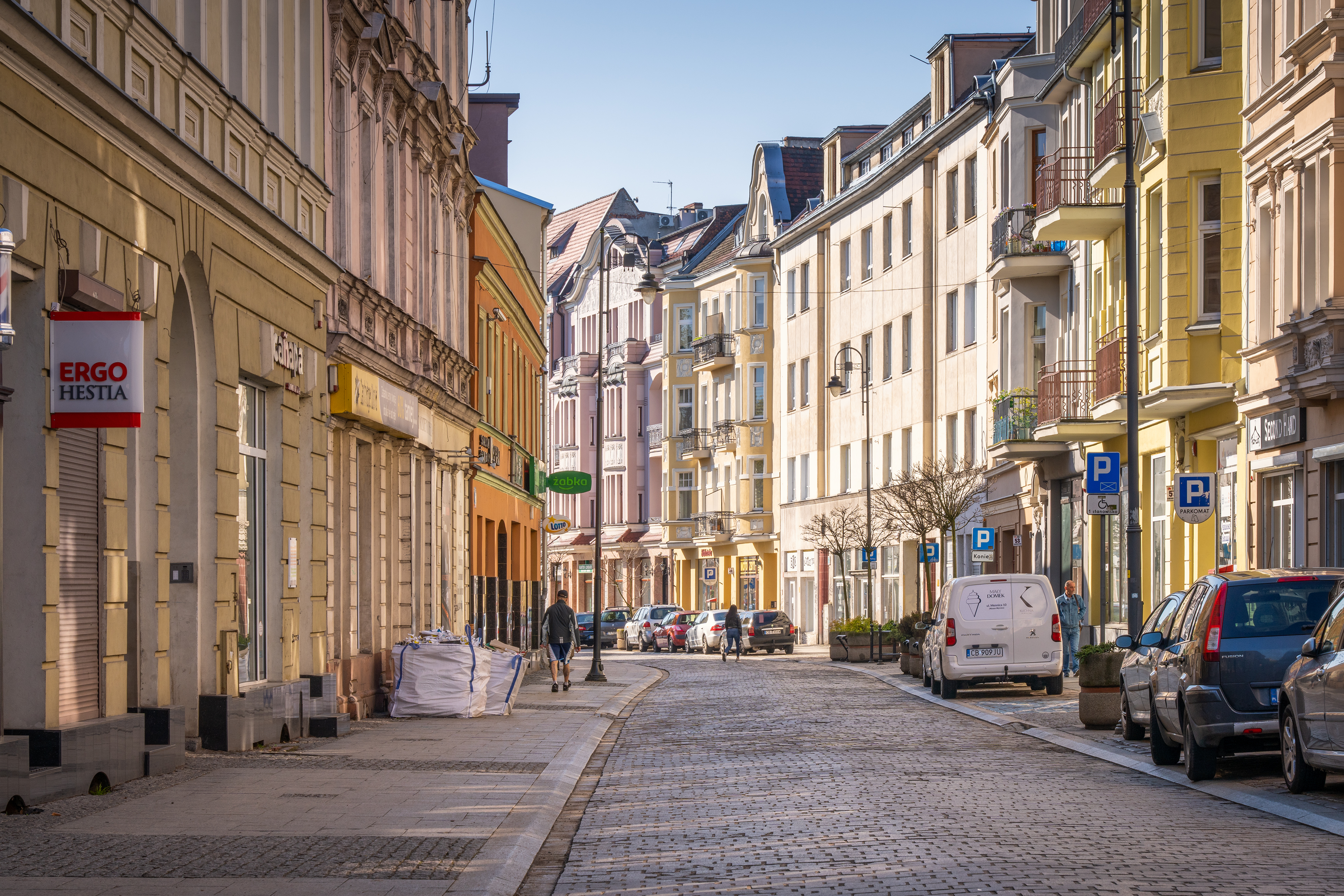
Dworcowa Street

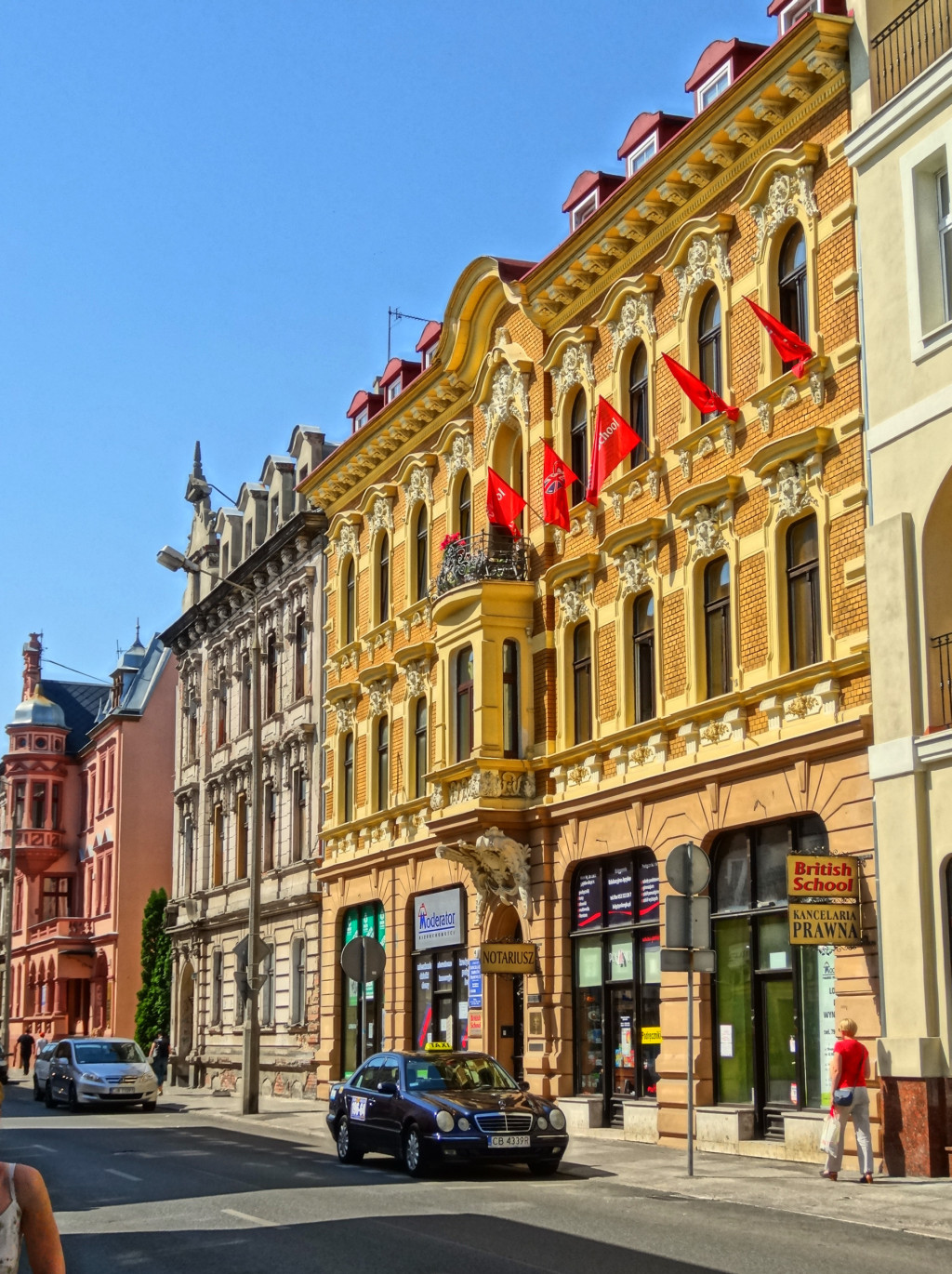
Śniadeckich Street

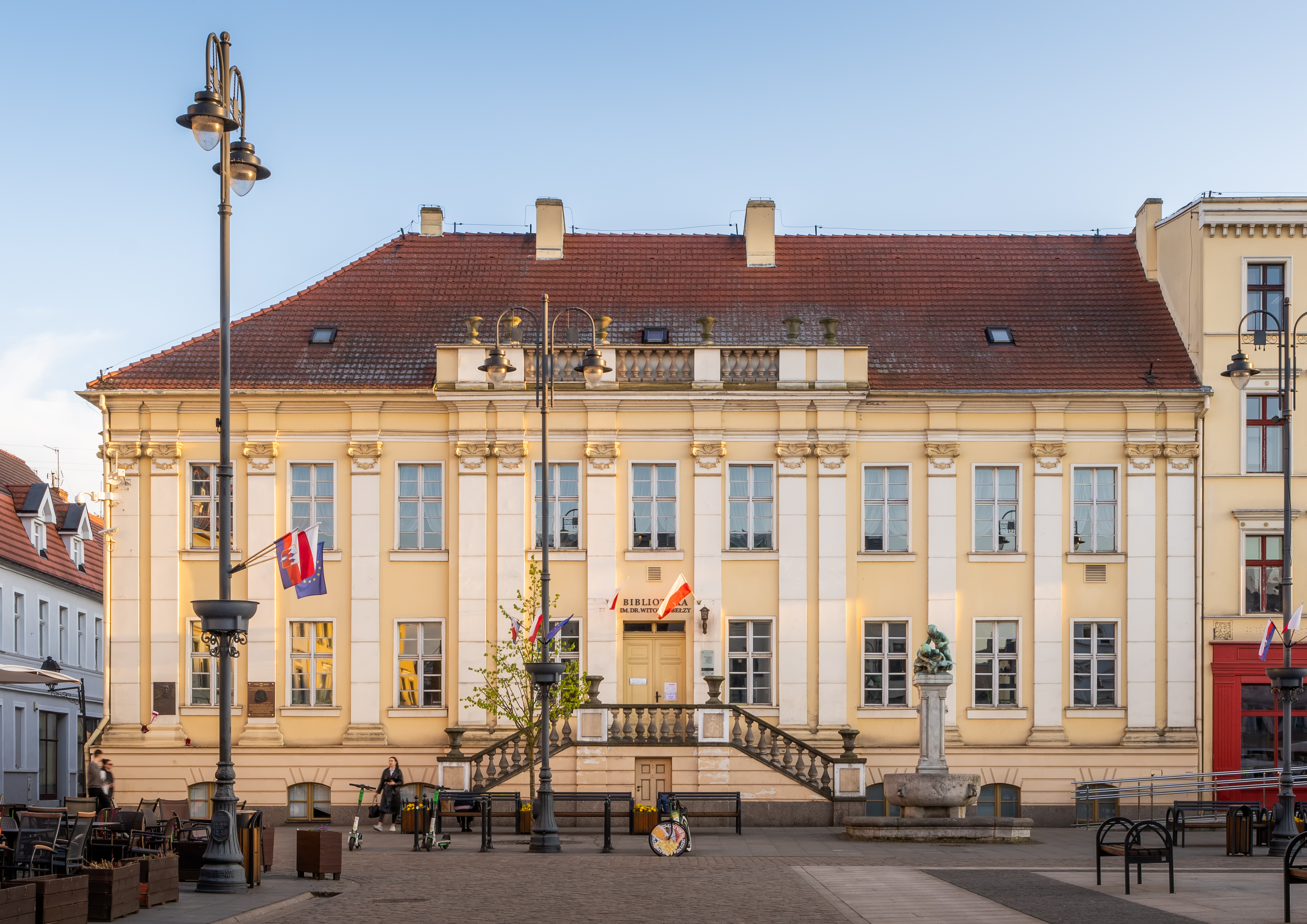
Main Library on the Old Market Square

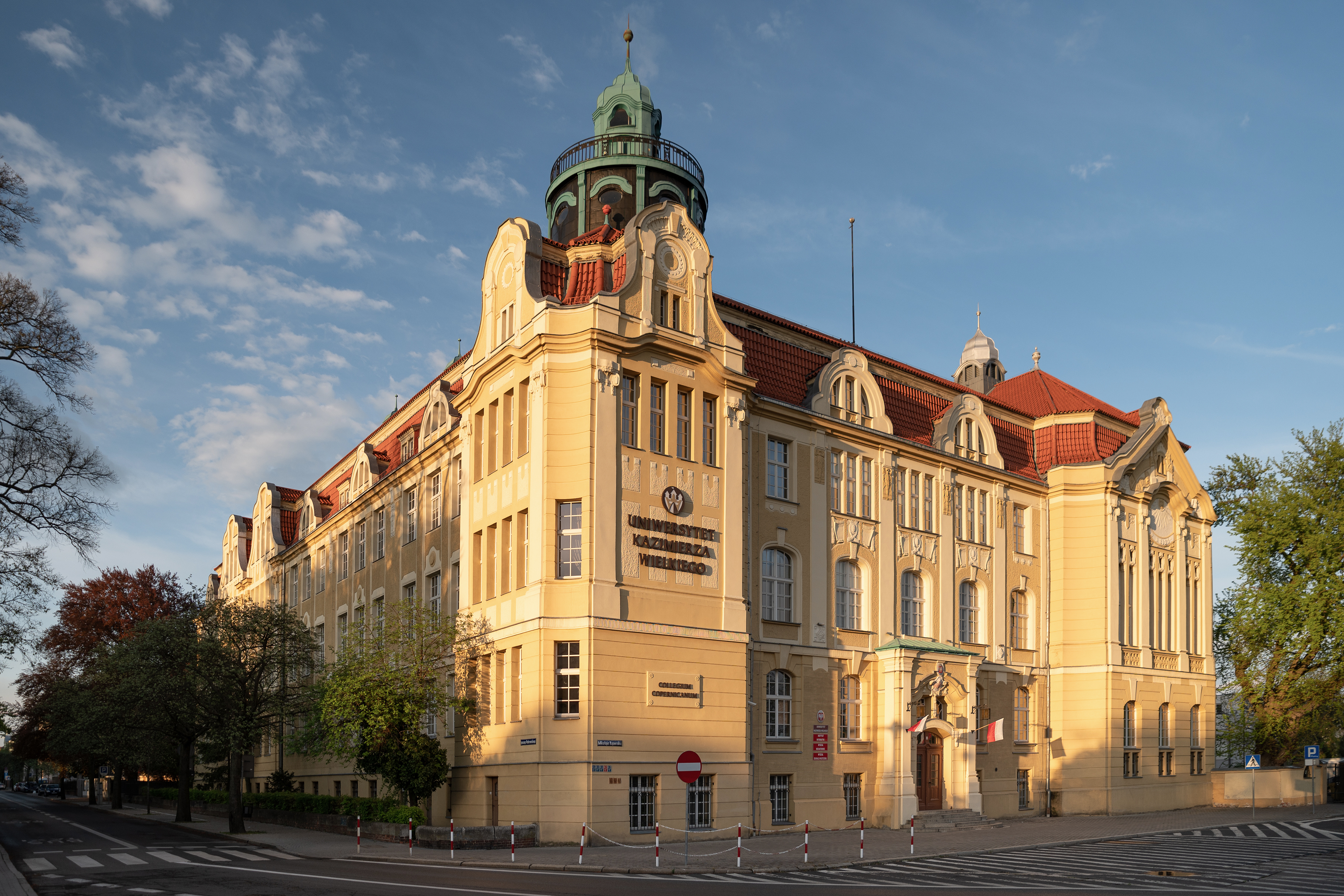
Institute of Applied Informatics (Kazimierz the Great University)

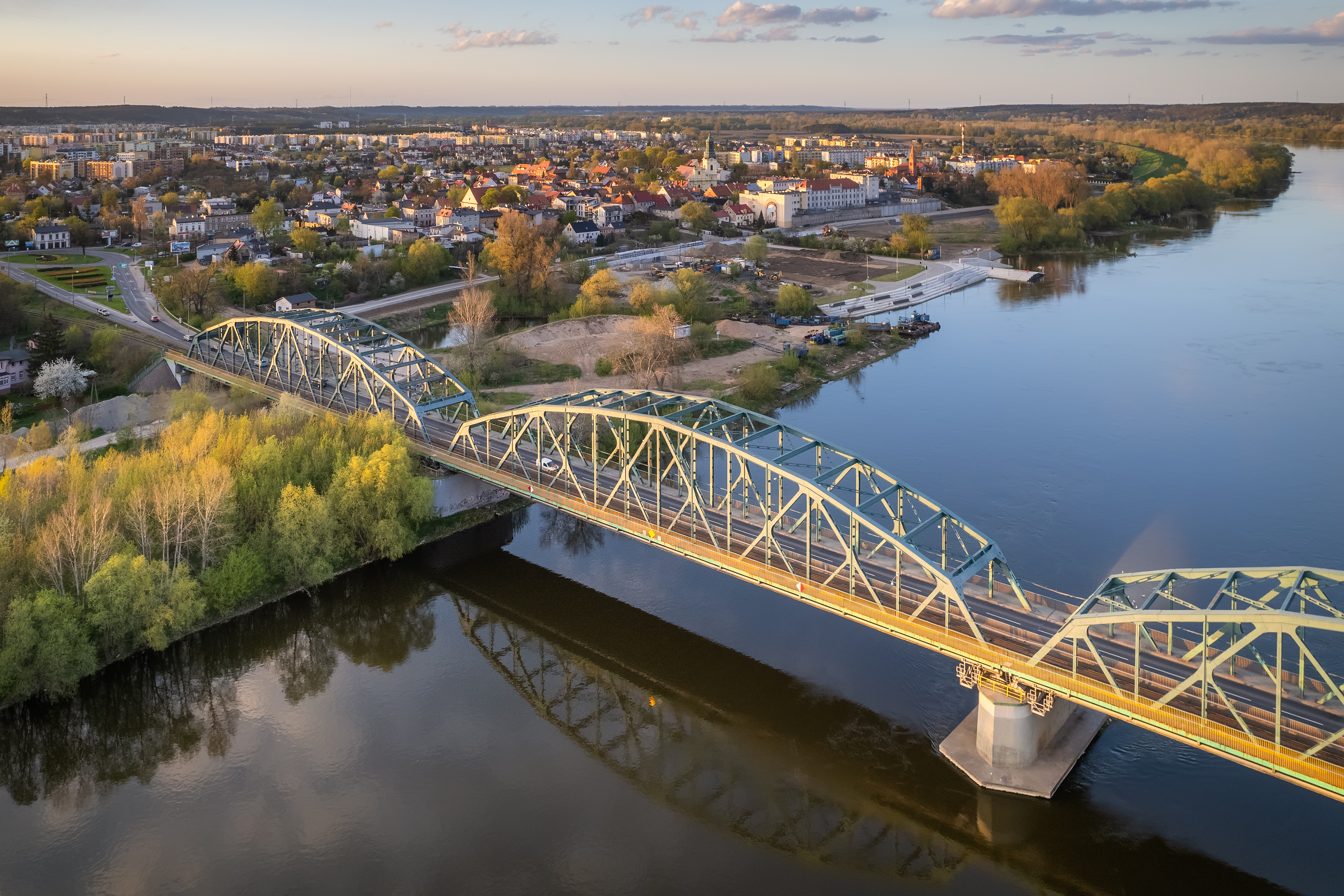
Ralph Modjeski Bridge in Fordon District

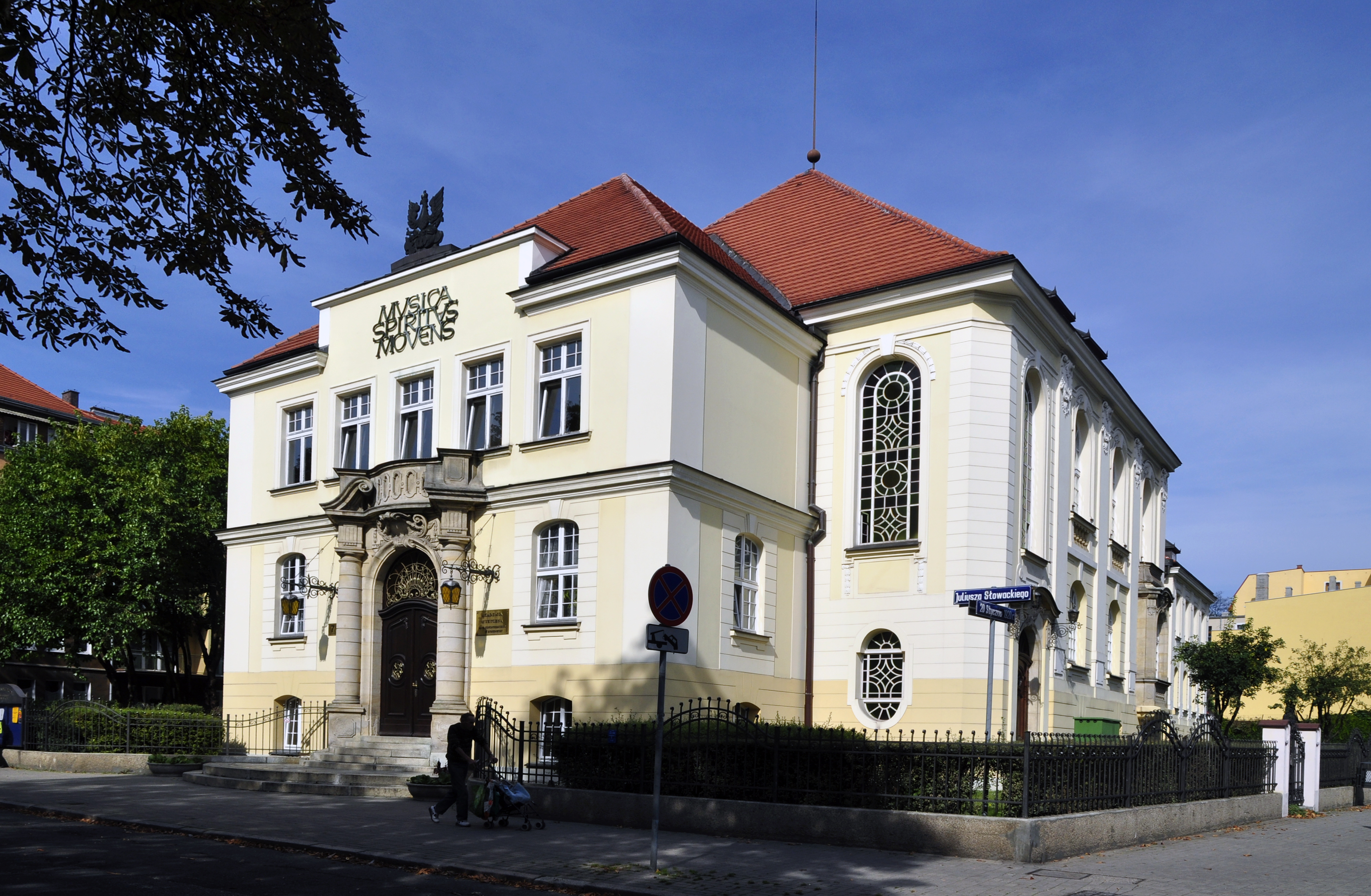
Academy of Music

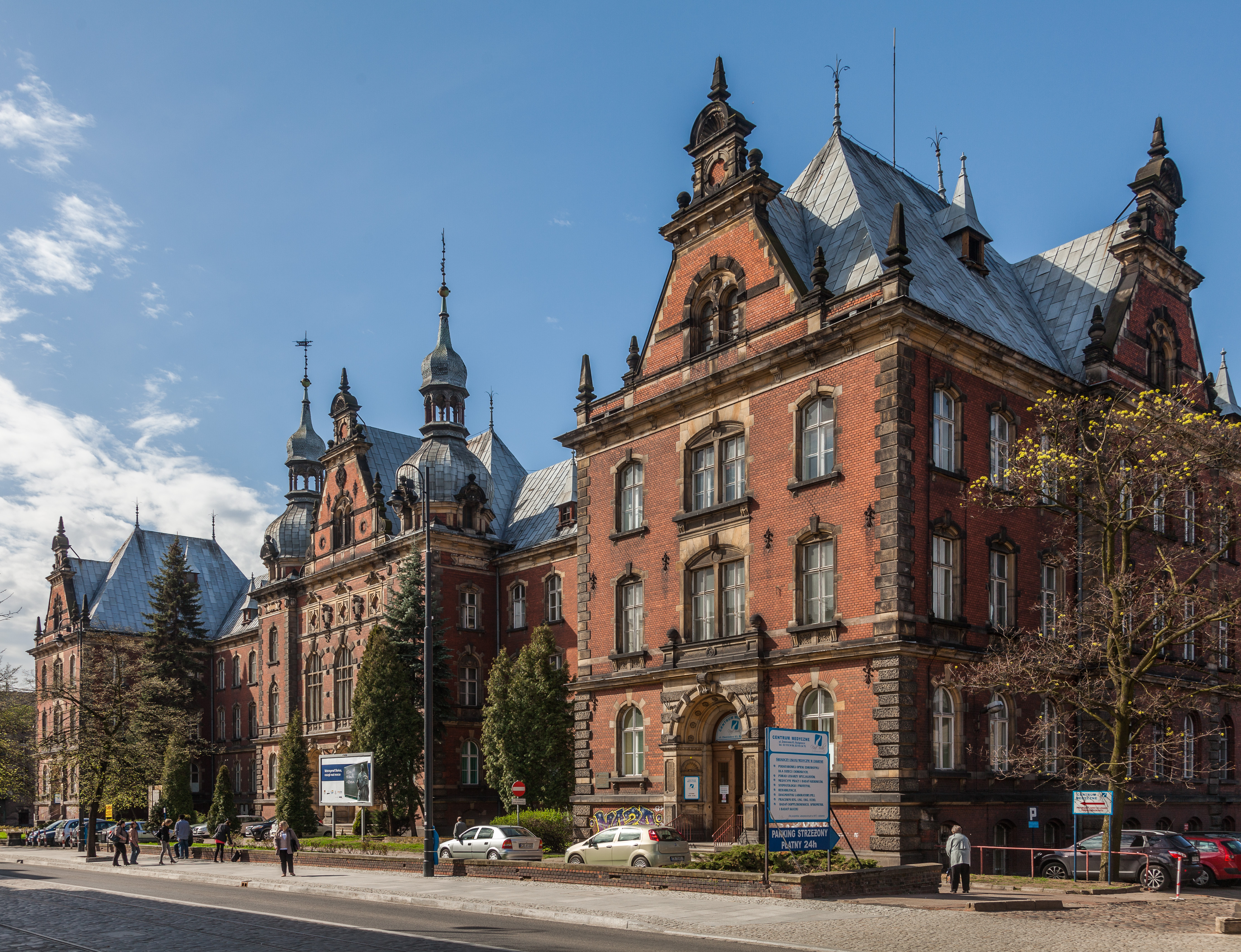
Former headquarters of the
Prussian Eastern Railway

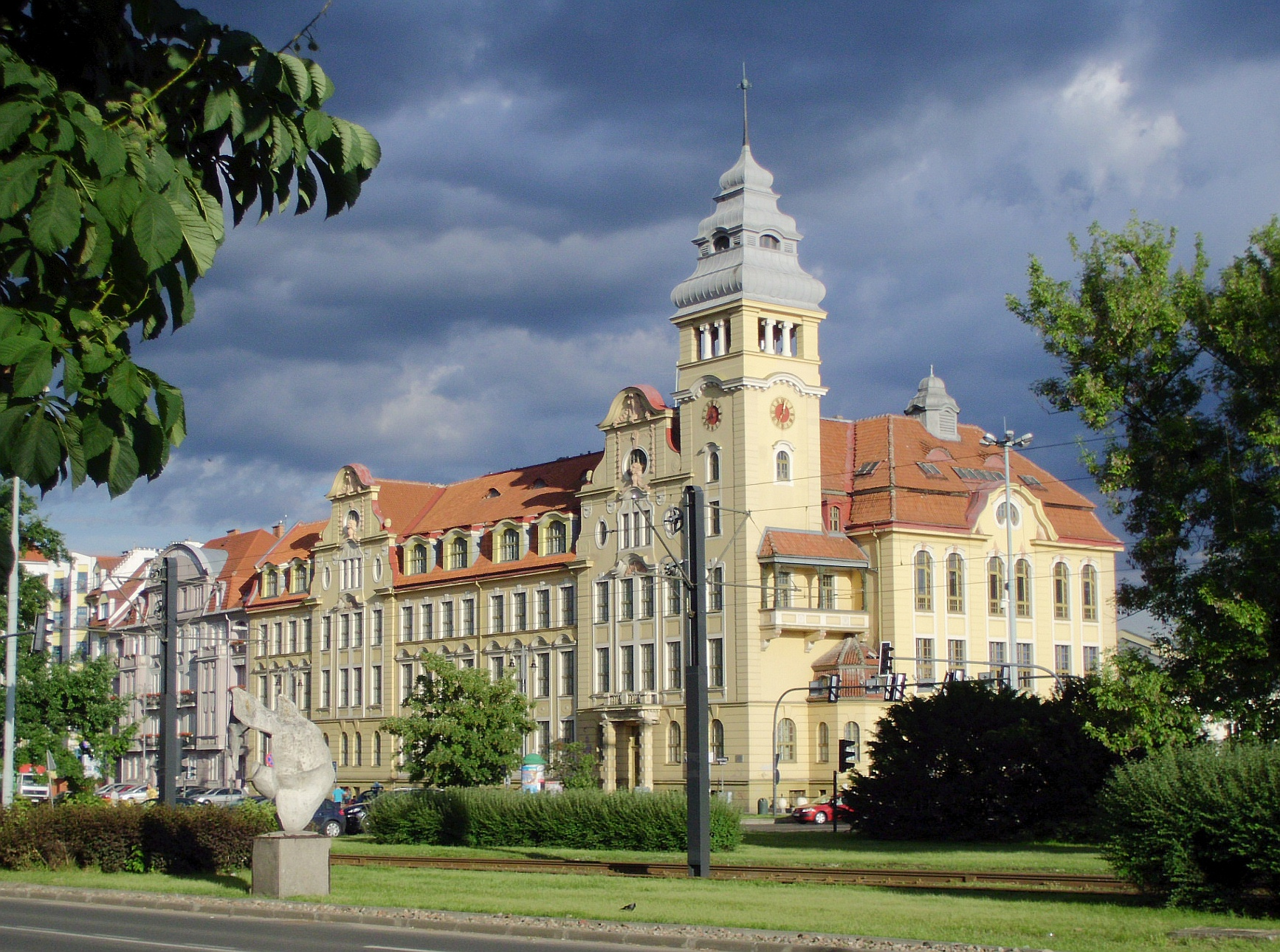
School of mechanics (secondary education)

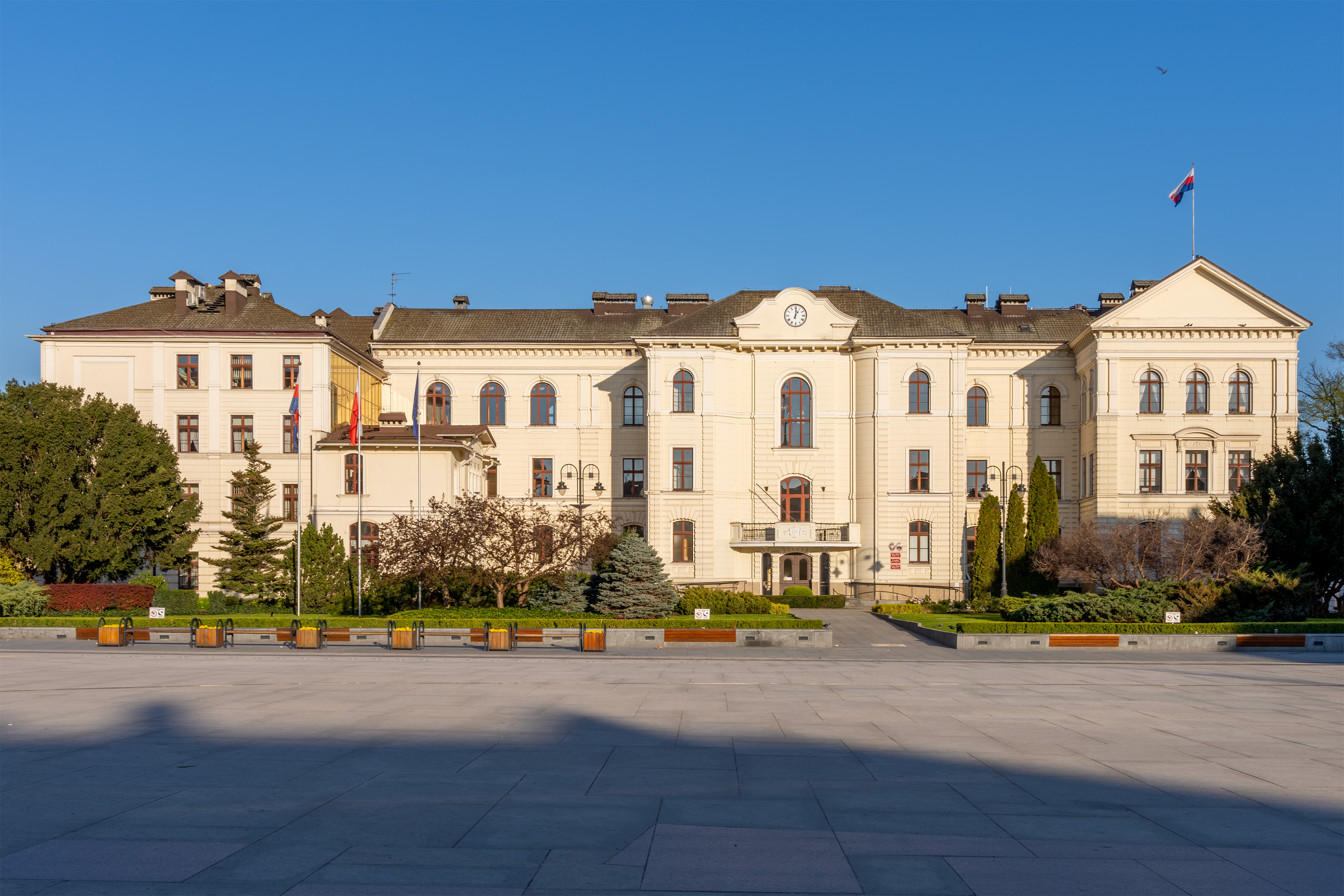
Former Jesuit College (1617), now the City Hall

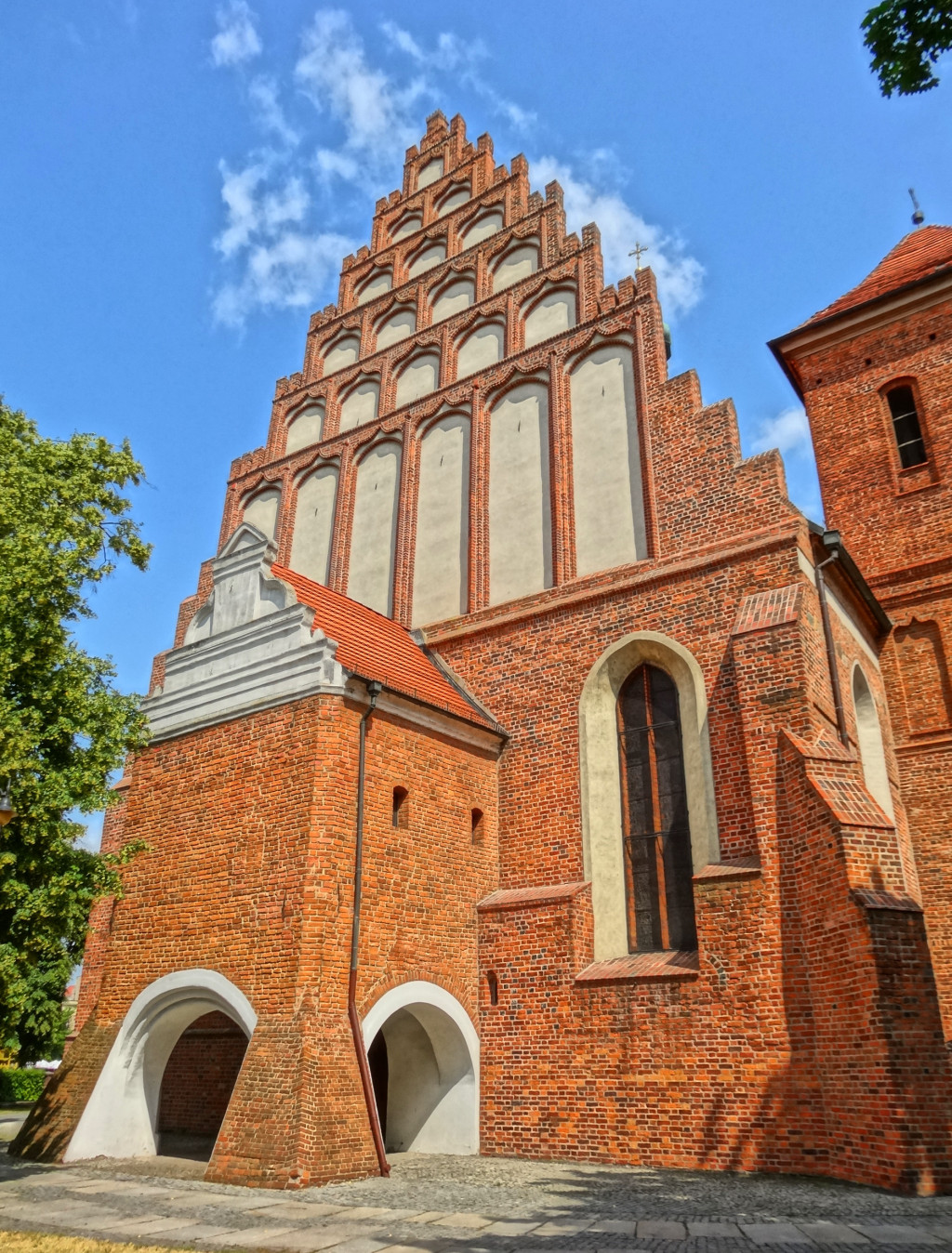
Bydgoszcz Cathedral's façade

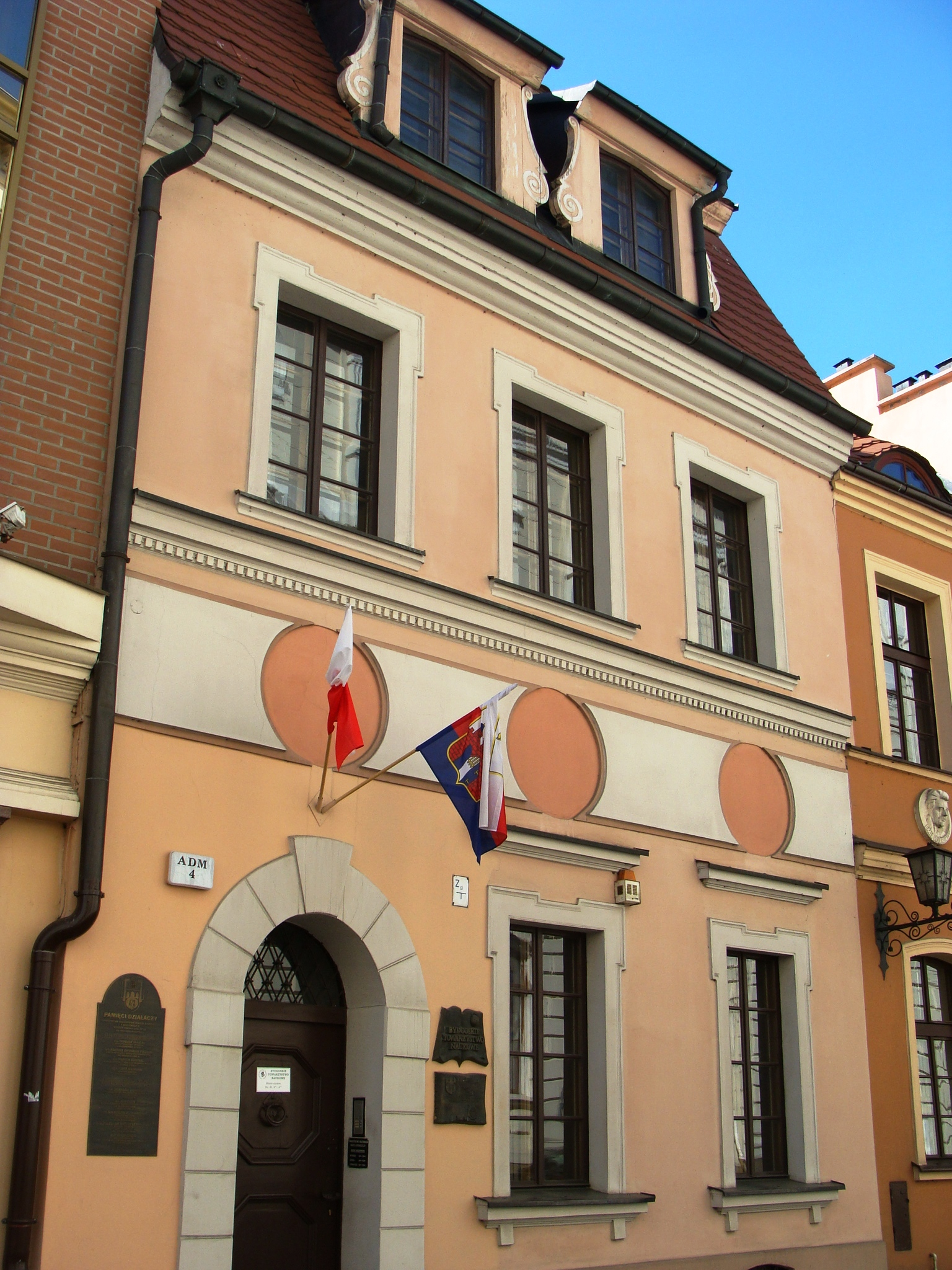
Bydgoszcz Scientific Society

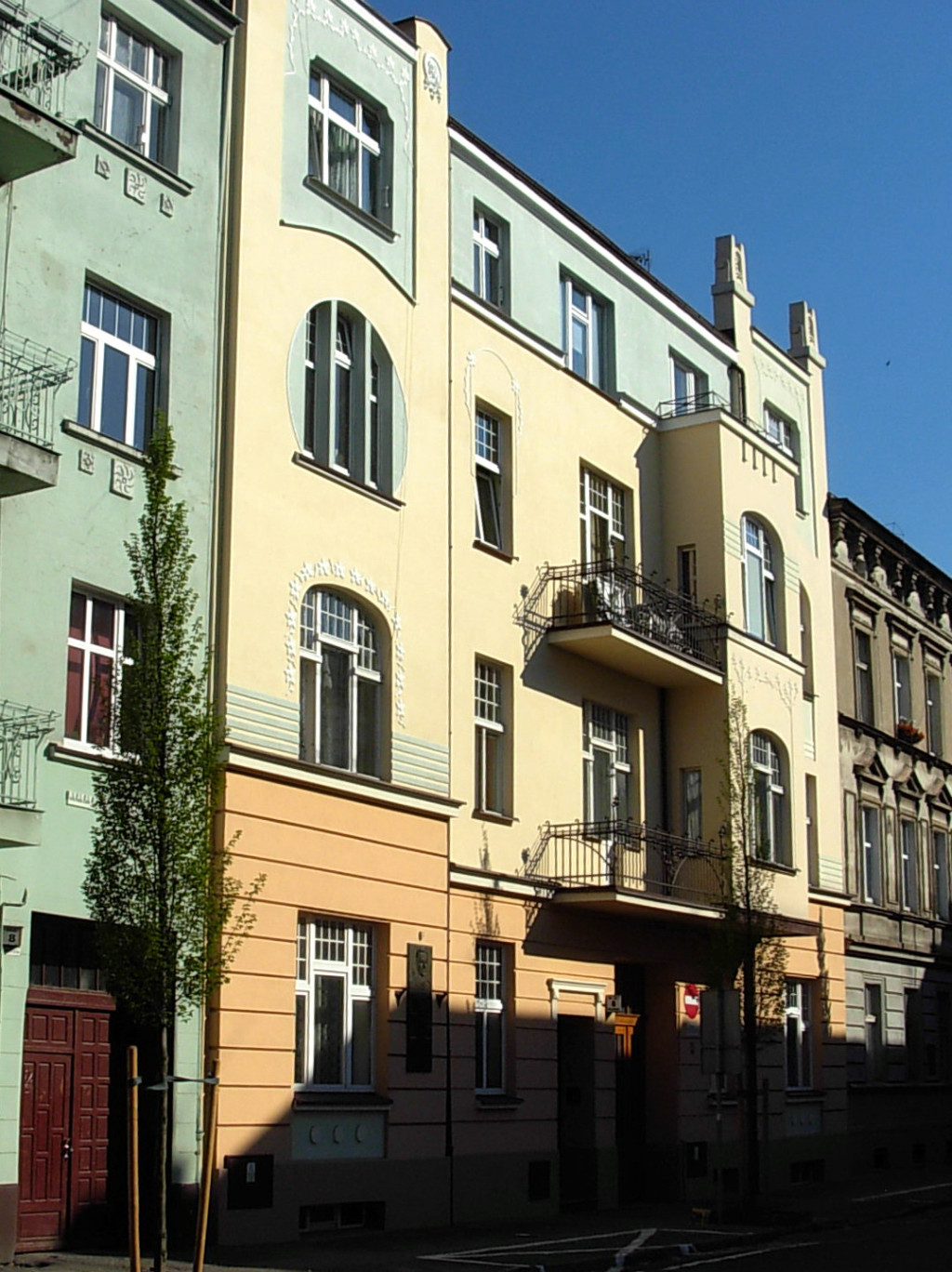
Birthplace of Marian Rejewski

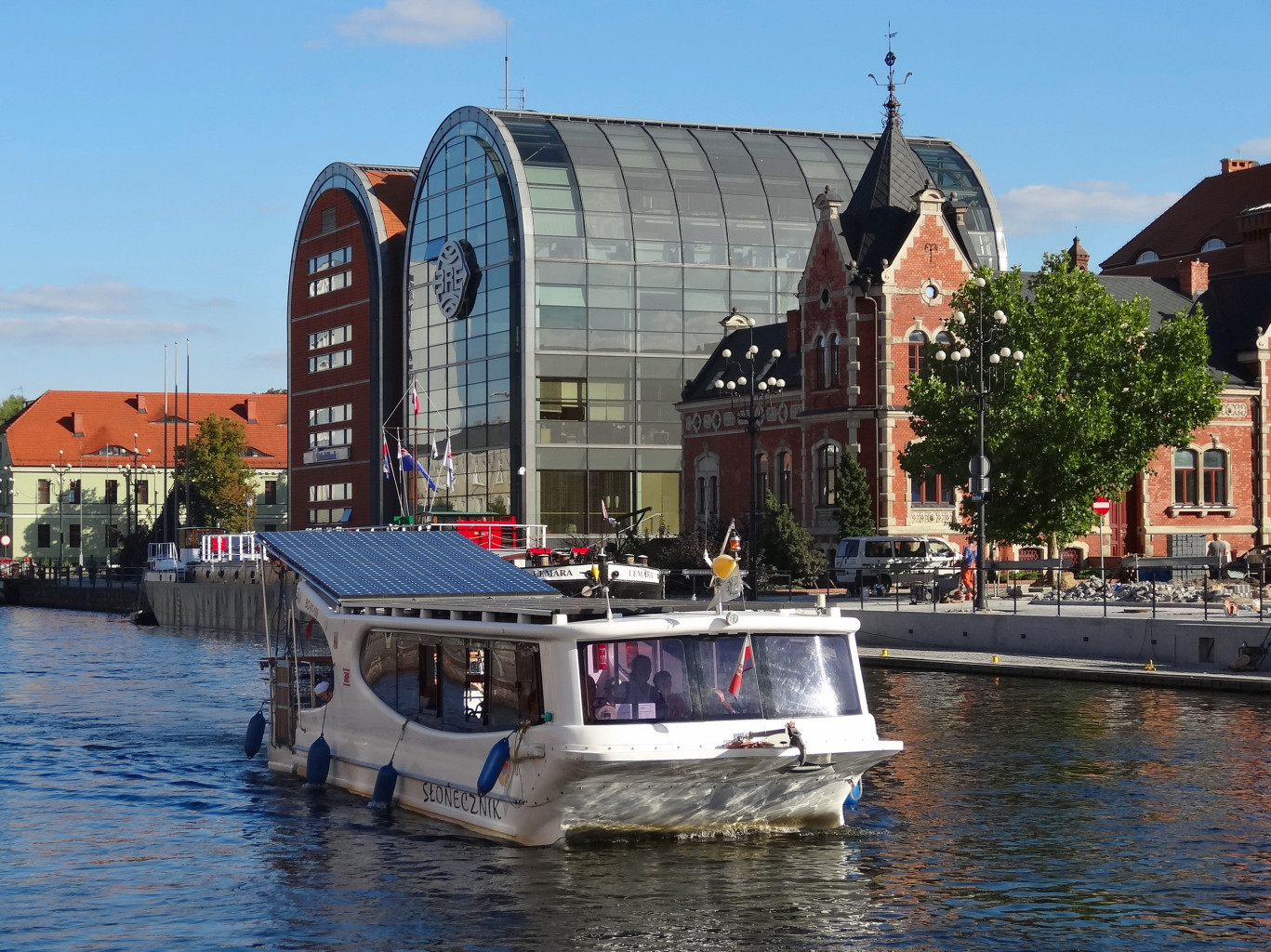
Brda River in the city centre

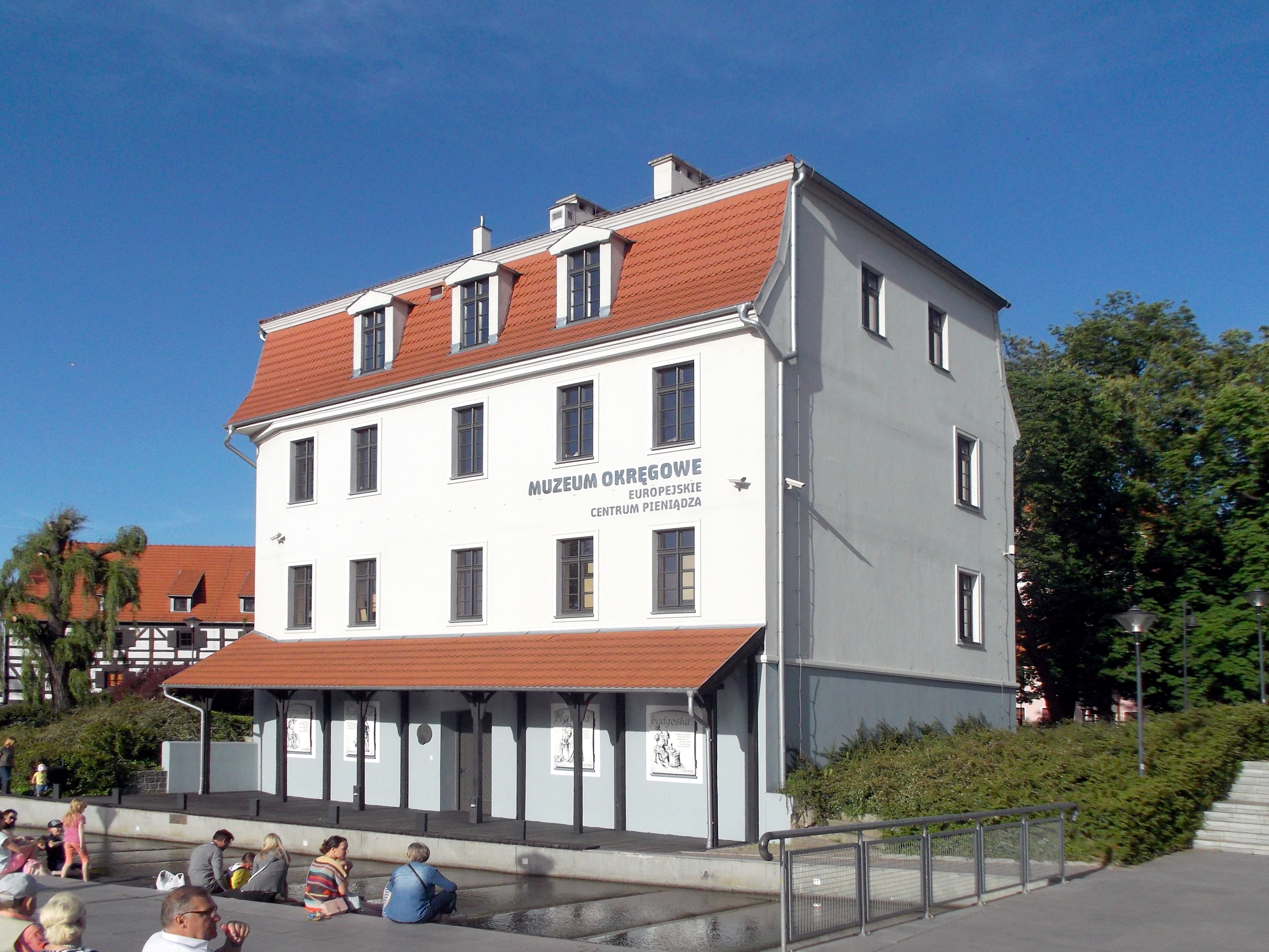
Former Polish Royal mint, now a museum

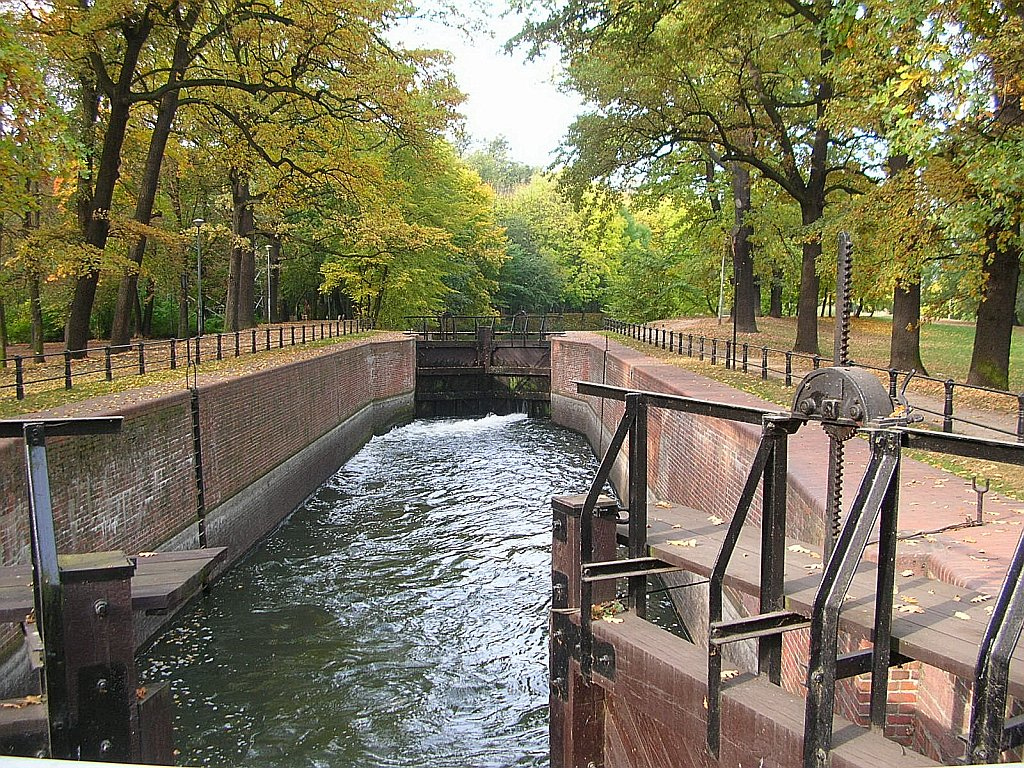
Sluice gate on Bydgoszcz Canal

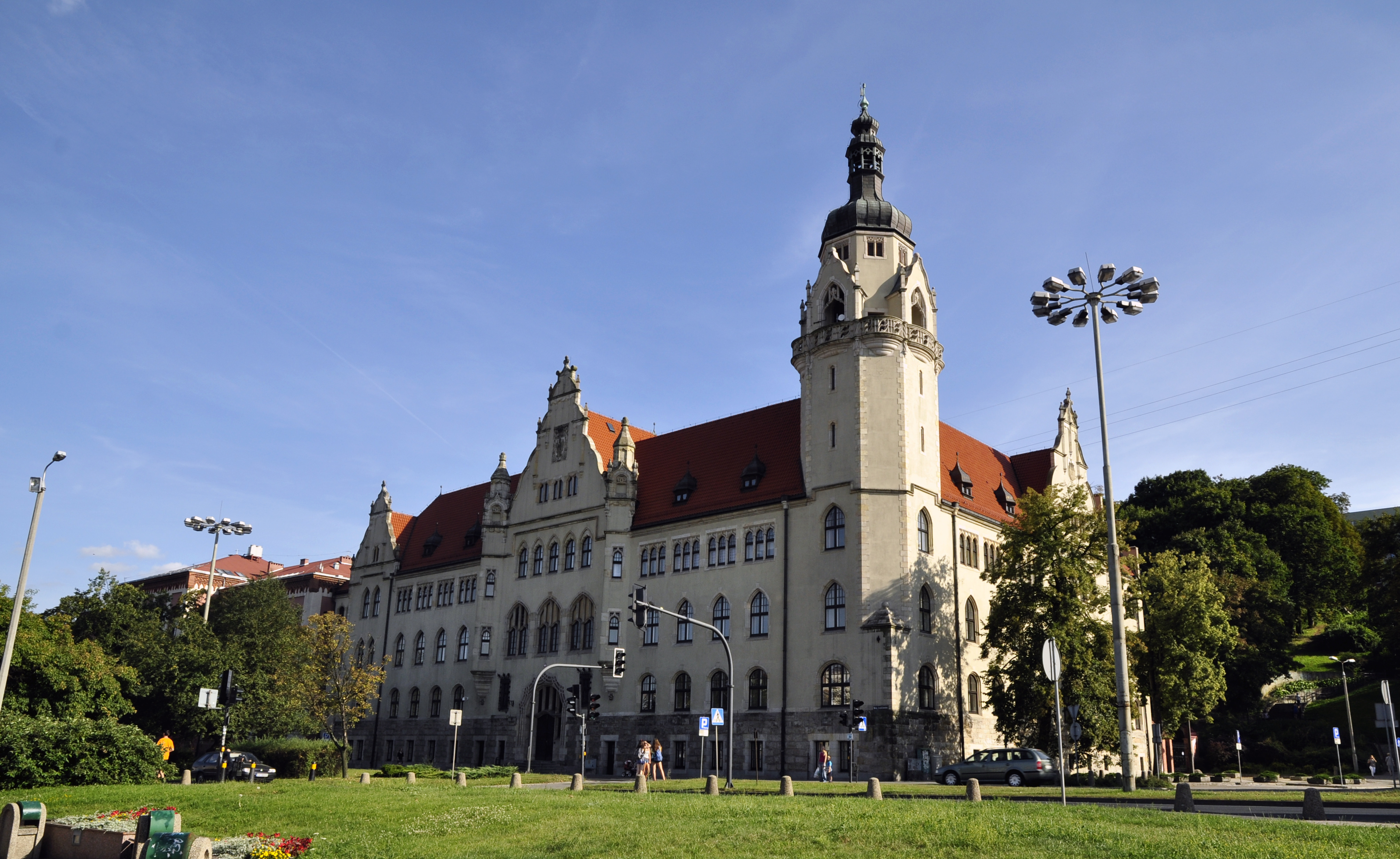
The district court building

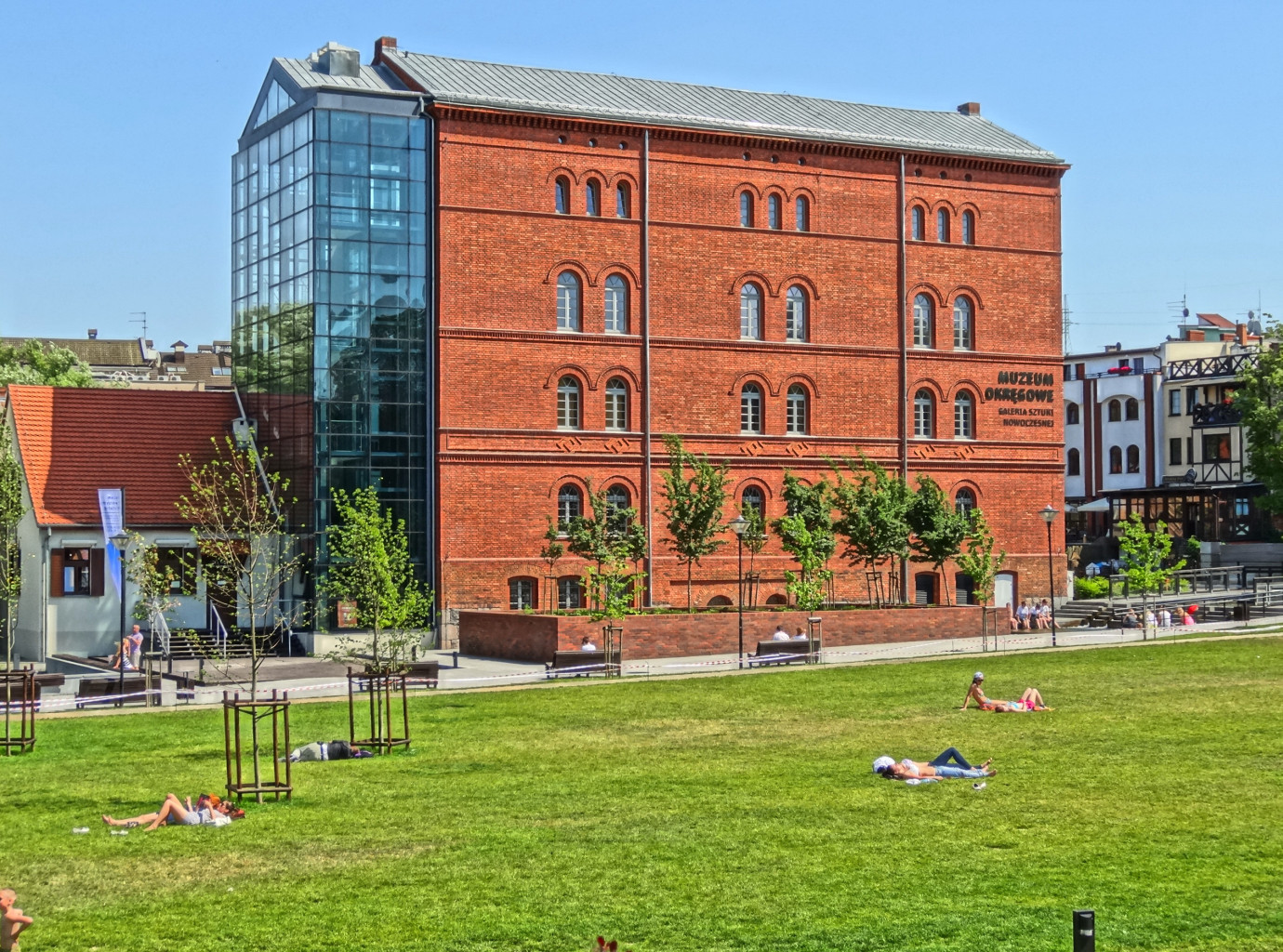
Czerwony Spichlerz – Museum of Contemporary Art in Bydgoszcz

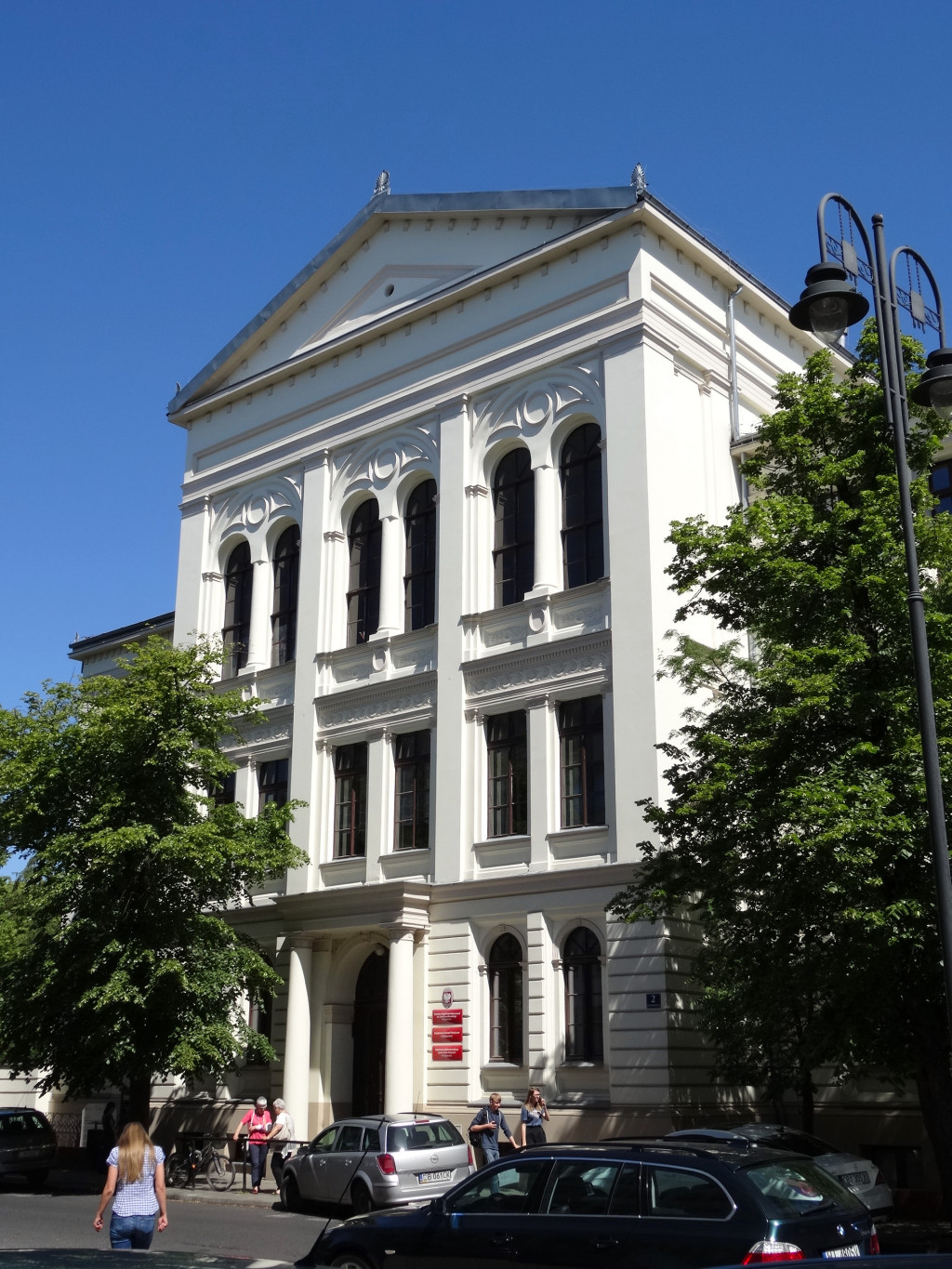
School of Fine Arts

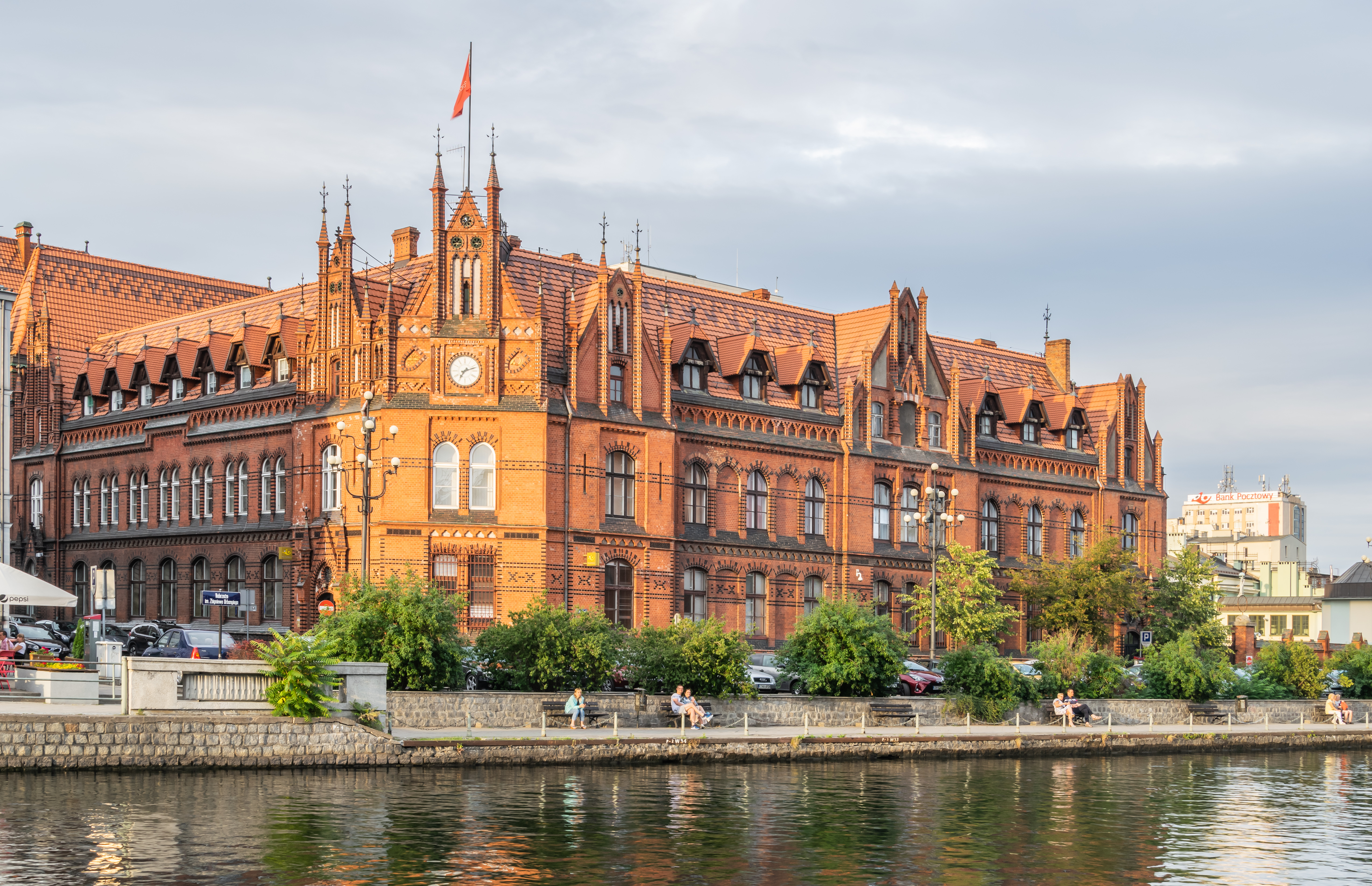
Main Post Office

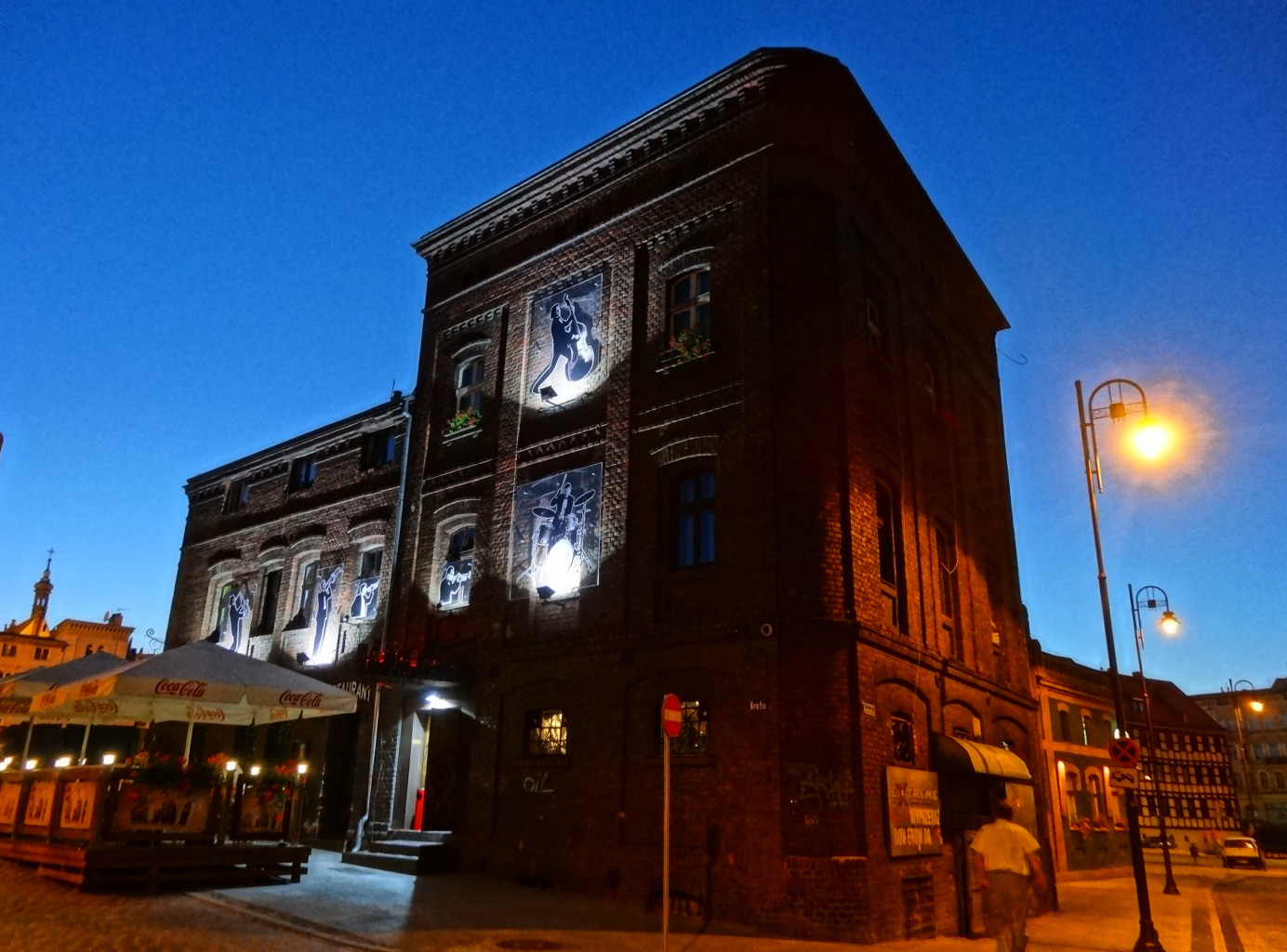
Music Club Eljazz

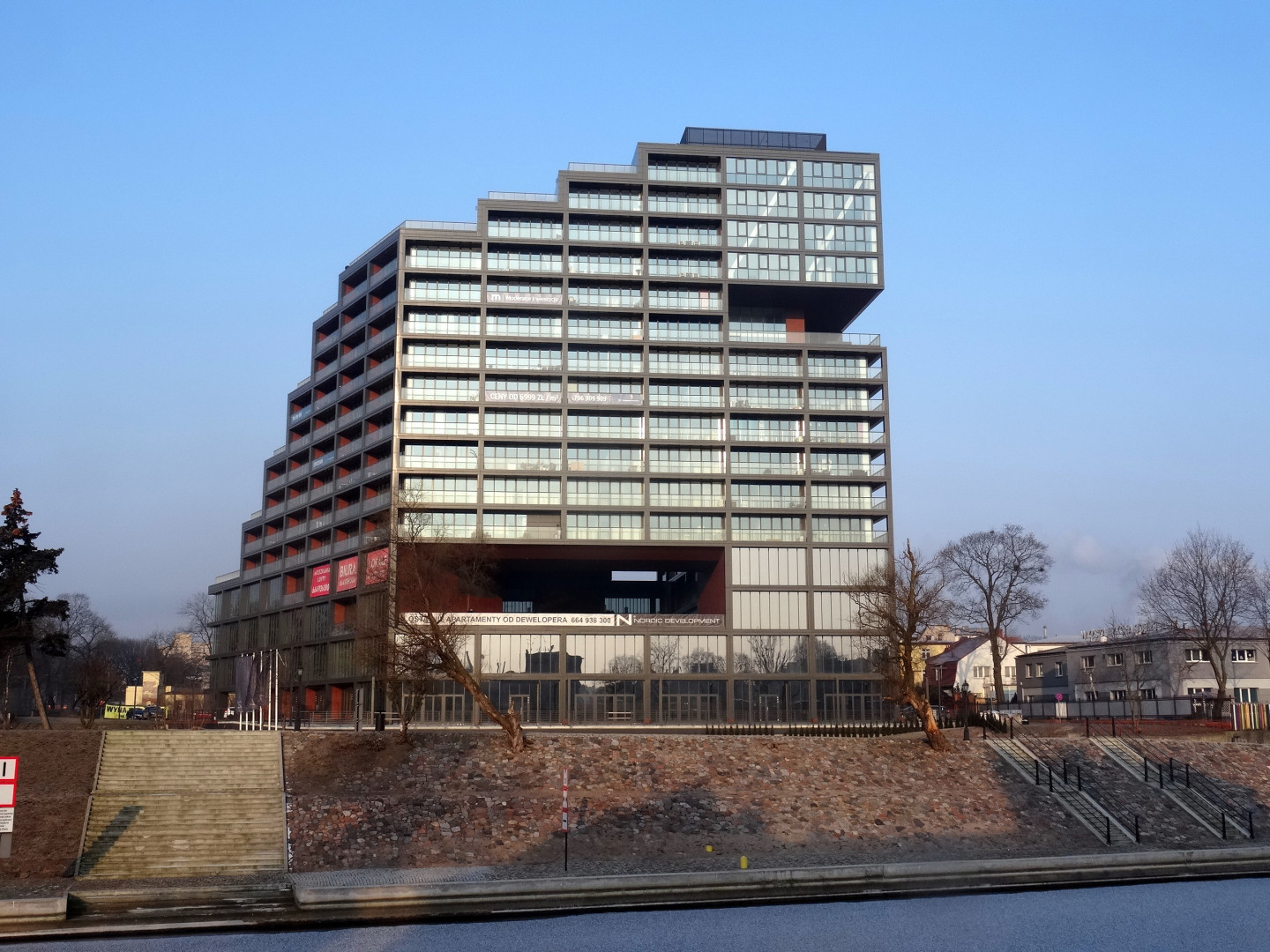
Nordic Haven apartment block

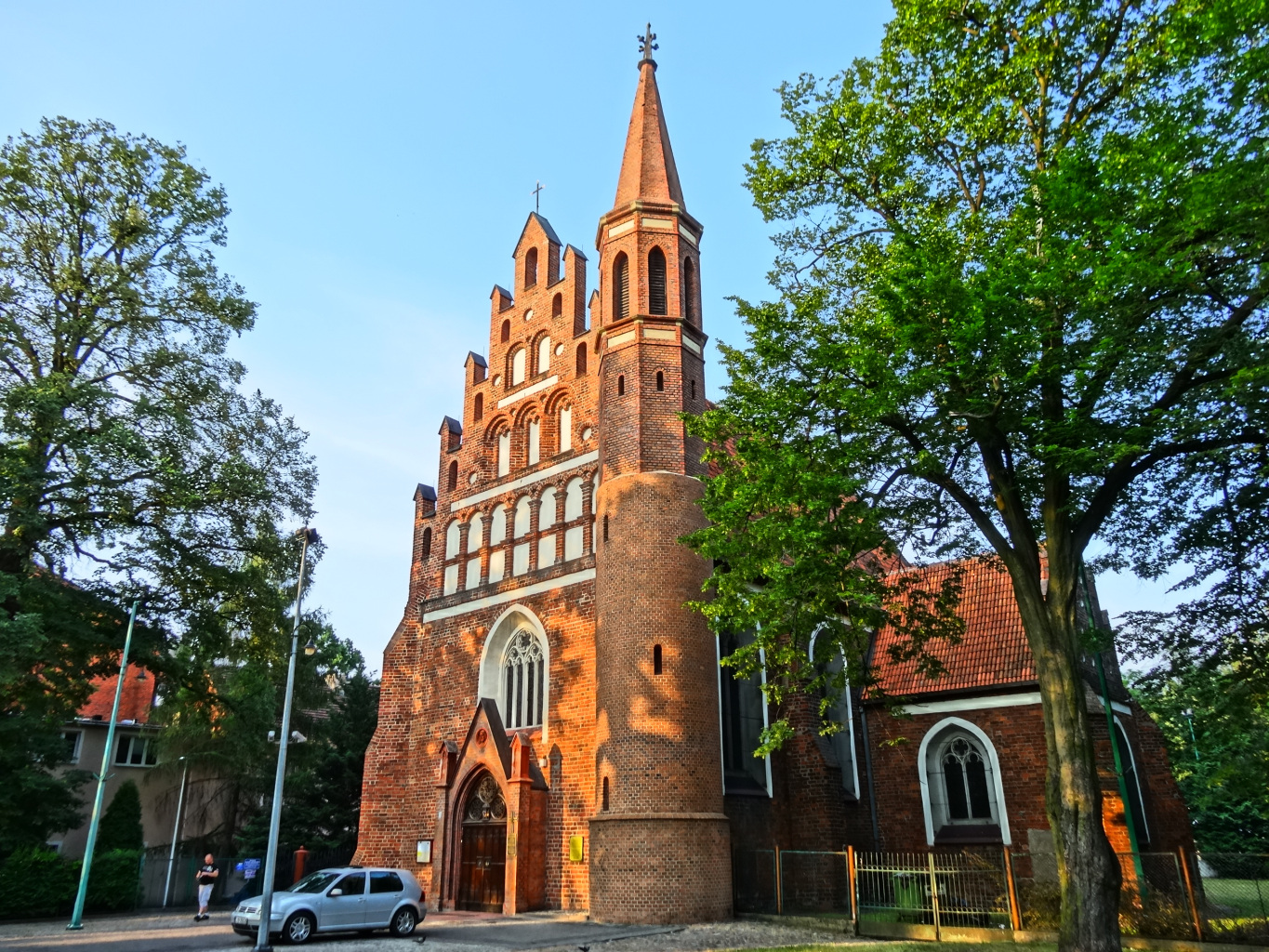
Bernardine church

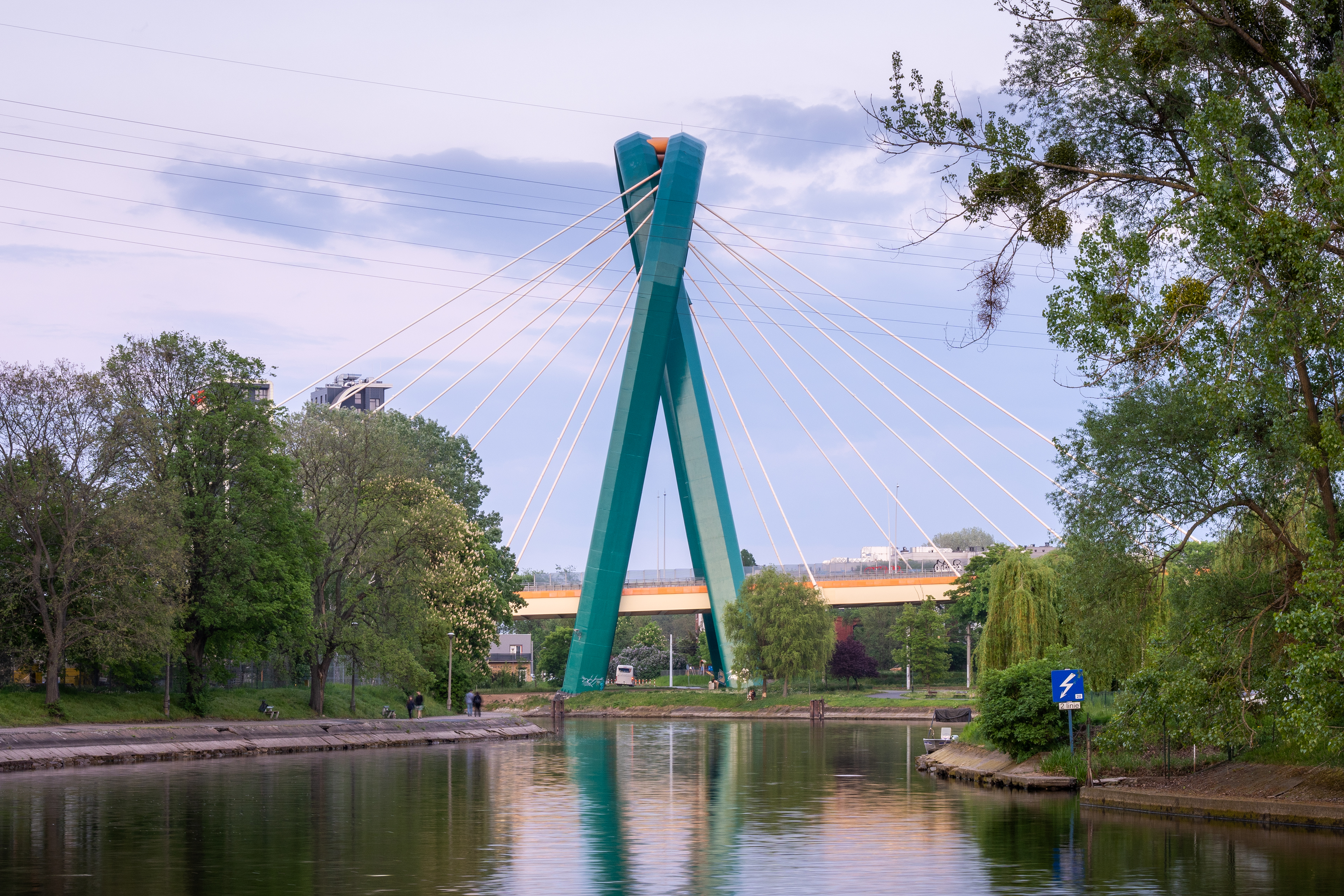
The University Bridge

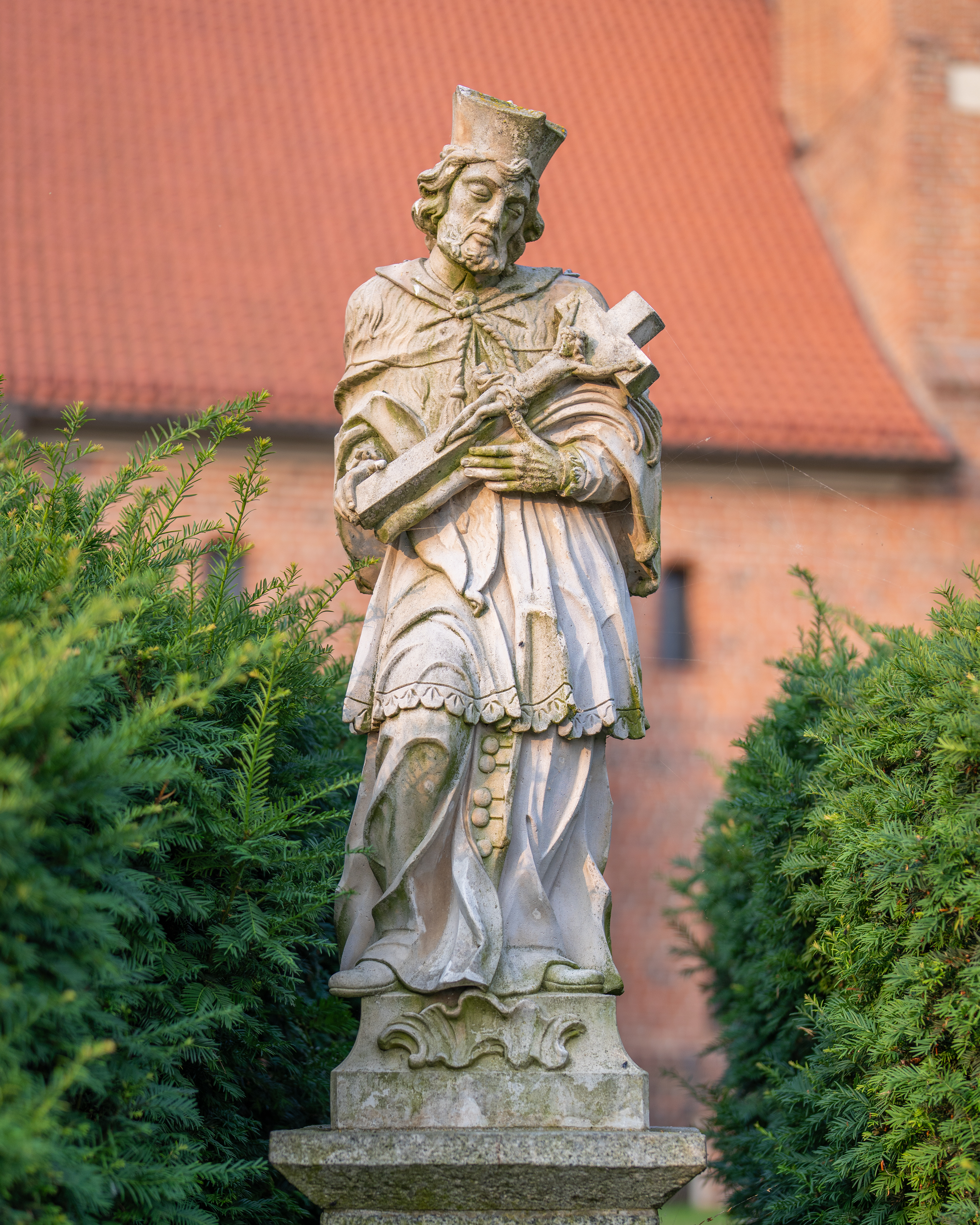
Statue of John of Nepomuk

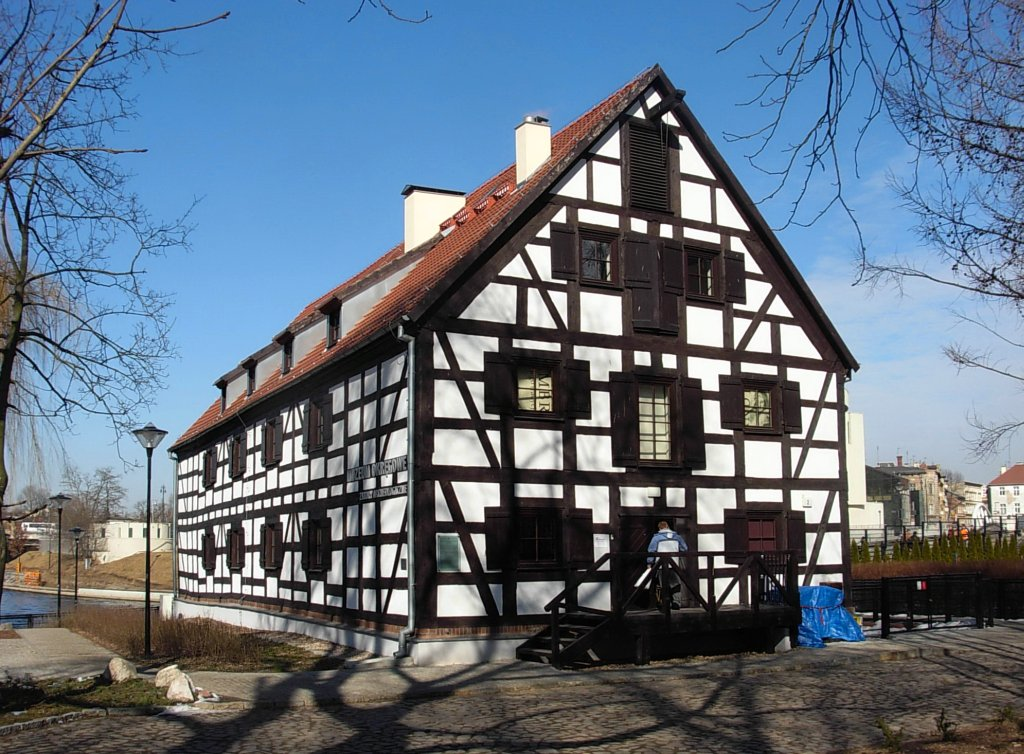
The White Granary, seat of the Archaeological Museum

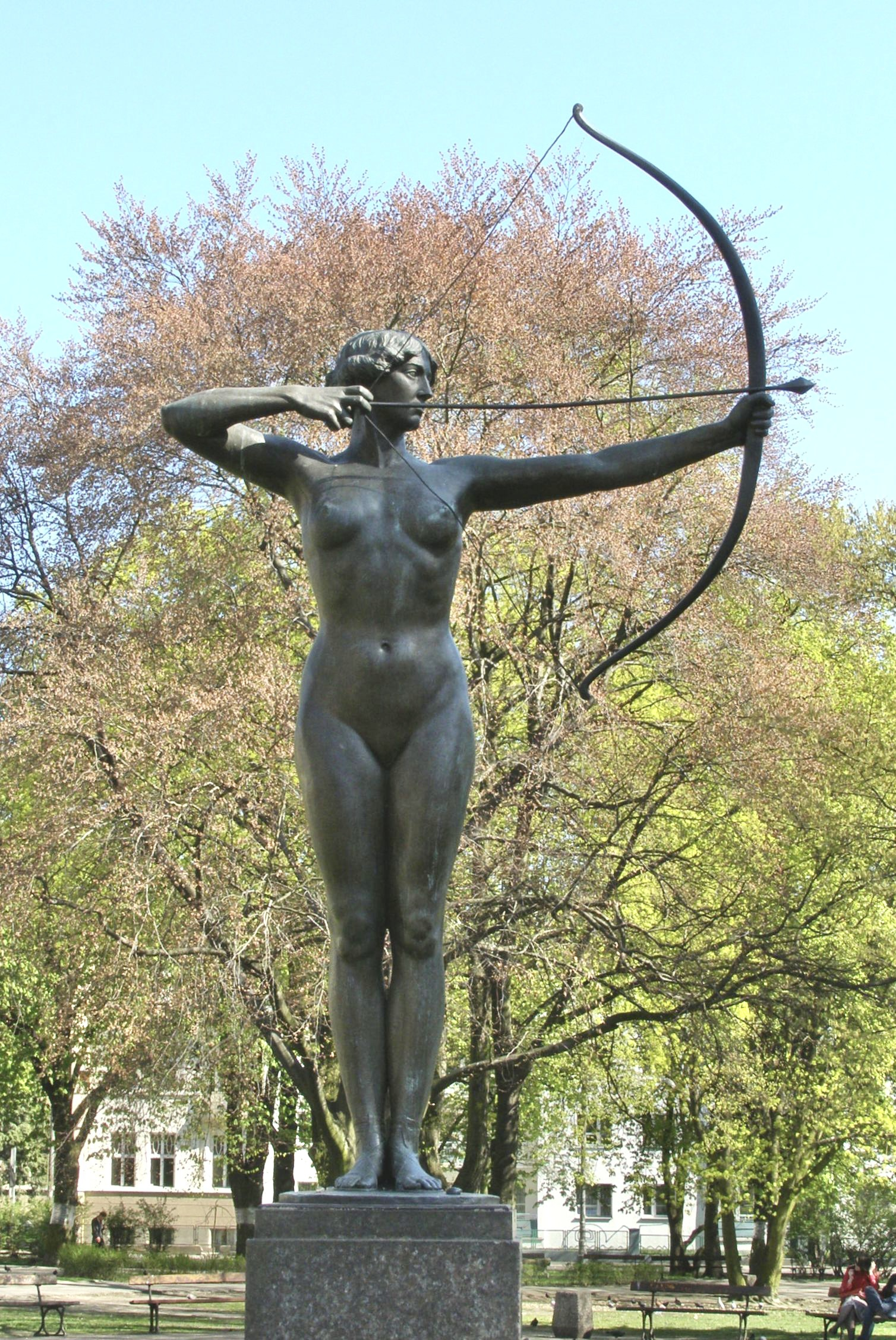
Łuczniczka (The Archeress, (Polish: Łuczniczka, German: Bogenspannerin)

== Climate ==
Bydgoszcz has a humid continental climate (Köppen Dfb).

Climate data for Bydgoszcz (1991–2020 normals, extremes 1951–1982 and 1992–2015)
Month	Jan	Feb	Mar	Apr	May	Jun	Jul	Aug	Sep	Oct	Nov	Dec	Year
Record high °C (°F)	13.0 (55.4)	14.1 (57.4)	22.8 (73.0)	30.7 (87.3)	31.9 (89.4)	35.5 (95.9)	38.3 (100.9)	37.0 (98.6)	33.4 (92.1)	28.2 (82.8)	19.5 (67.1)	15.9 (60.6)	38.3 (100.9)
Mean maximum °C (°F)	8.2 (46.8)	9.4 (48.9)	15.7 (60.3)	23.3 (73.9)	27.5 (81.5)	30.6 (87.1)	31.7 (89.1)	31.1 (88.0)	25.5 (77.9)	20.0 (68.0)	13.1 (55.6)	8.8 (47.8)	33.1 (91.6)
Mean daily maximum °C (°F)	1.1 (34.0)	2.7 (36.9)	6.9 (44.4)	14.1 (57.4)	19.4 (66.9)	22.1 (71.8)	24.6 (76.3)	23.9 (75.0)	18.6 (65.5)	12.7 (54.9)	6.2 (43.2)	2.0 (35.6)	12.9 (55.2)
Daily mean °C (°F)	−1.5 (29.3)	−0.4 (31.3)	2.5 (36.5)	8.5 (47.3)	13.7 (56.7)	16.7 (62.1)	19.1 (66.4)	18.2 (64.8)	13.3 (55.9)	8.2 (46.8)	3.5 (38.3)	−0.3 (31.5)	8.5 (47.2)
Mean daily minimum °C (°F)	−3.7 (25.3)	−3.0 (26.6)	−0.8 (30.6)	3.5 (38.3)	8.1 (46.6)	11.2 (52.2)	13.7 (56.7)	13.1 (55.6)	9.3 (48.7)	5.1 (41.2)	1.3 (34.3)	−2.4 (27.7)	4.6 (40.3)
Mean minimum °C (°F)	−14.9 (5.2)	−12.4 (9.7)	−8.3 (17.1)	−3.1 (26.4)	0.9 (33.6)	5.6 (42.1)	8.8 (47.8)	7.6 (45.7)	2.7 (36.9)	−2.3 (27.9)	−5.9 (21.4)	−11.7 (10.9)	−18.3 (−0.9)
Record low °C (°F)	−29.9 (−21.8)	−26.6 (−15.9)	−25.4 (−13.7)	−8.5 (16.7)	−5.1 (22.8)	−1.8 (28.8)	2.5 (36.5)	1.9 (35.4)	−4.0 (24.8)	−8.3 (17.1)	−19.6 (−3.3)	−24.2 (−11.6)	−29.9 (−21.8)
Average precipitation mm (inches)	34.3 (1.35)	26.3 (1.04)	36.4 (1.43)	28.2 (1.11)	52.8 (2.08)	56.7 (2.23)	83.4 (3.28)	55.6 (2.19)	48.0 (1.89)	40.1 (1.58)	33.6 (1.32)	36.9 (1.45)	532.3 (20.95)
Average precipitation days (≥ 0.1 mm)	16.0	13.4	12.9	10.5	12.4	12.4	14.2	12.0	10.9	12.7	13.7	16.9	158.4
Average relative humidity (%)	86.8	86.6	81.4	71.5	69.7	71.1	73.6	75.4	81.7	86.3	90.5	89.3	80.3
Average dew point °C (°F)	−4 (25)	−3 (27)	−1 (30)	2 (36)	7 (45)	10 (50)	13 (55)	13 (55)	10 (50)	6 (43)	3 (37)	−1 (30)	5 (40)
Source 1: Meteomodel.pl
Source 2: Time and Date (dewpoints, 2005-2015)

== People born in Bydgoszcz ==
- Maximilian Piotrowski (1813–1875), painter, Kunstakademie Königsberg professor
- Alexander Schimmelfennig (1824–1865) and Charles L. Matthies (1824–1868), American Civil War generals (Union)
- Georg von Schleinitz (1834–1910), explorer, governor of German New Guinea
- Adolf Rosenberg (1850–1906), theater critic and art historian
- Adolf Martens (1850–1914), metallurgist
- Max von Boehn (1850−1921), general
- Jan Biziel (1858–1934), physician
- Clara Hammerl (1858–1931), first woman to lead a Spanish financial institution
- Józef Święcicki (1859–1913), architect
- Hugo Hergesell (1859–1938), meteorologist
- Hermann Dietz (1861–1944), physician
- Imro Fox (1862–1910), chef, magician
- Louis Jacobsohn-Lask (1863–1941), neurologist and neuroanatomist
- Walter Leistikow (1865–1908), painter
- Julian Borchardt (1868–1932), socialist politician
- Julius Gehl (1869–1945), vice president of the Senate of the Free City of Danzig
- Martin Gorecki (1871–1928), brewery worker and Socialist member of the Wisconsin State Assembly
- Max Friedlaender (1873–1956), lawyer
- Gertrud von Kunowski (1877–1960), painter
- Emil Warmiński (1881–1909), physician
- Erich Regener (1881–1955), physicist, designer of instruments to measure cosmic ray intensity
- Samuel Roxy Rothafel (1882–1936), theatrical impresario, Amanda Peet great-grandfather
- Erwin von Sigel (1884–1967), Olympic runner
- Eberhard von Mackensen (1889–1969), general
- Margarete Schlegel (1899–1987), actress and soprano operetta singer
- George Adamski (1891–1965), metaphysics teacher, UFO contactee
- Erich Buchholz (1891–1972), painter
- Hermann Souchon (1895–1982), naval officer, executed Rosa Luxemburg
- Mieczysław Garsztka (1896–1919), aviator
- Bronisław Kłobucki (1896–1944), sculptor and painter
- Hermann Maaß (1897–1944), German Resistance fighter
- Teodor and Franciszek Gajewski (1897–1969), sculptors and painters
- Kurt Tank (1898–1983), aerospace engineer
- Marten von Barnekow (1900–1967), equestrian, Olympic gold medalist
- Max Jacobson (1900–1979), physician of John F. Kennedy
- Wolfgang Schmieder (1901–1990), music librarian and musicologist
- Alfred Ingemar Berndt (1905–1945) German writer and propagandist
- Marian Rejewski (1905–1980), mathematician and cryptologist
- Franciszek Bronikowski (1907–1964), Olympic rower
- Klara Prillowa (1907–1991), sculptor
- Eric Seelig (1909–1984), boxing champion
- Lothar Wolff (1909–1988), film editor, producer
- Ola Obarska (1919–1994), actress, operetta singer
- Hilde Zadek (1917–2019), operatic soprano
- Zbigniew Kuźmiński (1921–2005), film director and screenwriter
- Stefan Klajbor (1924–1991), architect
- Juliusz Bogdan Deczkowski (1924–1998), soldier, writer
- Danuta Kleisinger (1924–2017), Righteous Among the Nations
- Richard Ogorkiewicz (1926–2019), engineer
- Teodor Kocerka (1927–1999), rower
- Edmund Michał Piszcz (1929–2022), archbishop of Warmia
- Kazimierz Karabasz (1930–2018), documentary filmmaker
- Eulalia Szwajkowska (1932–2009), Olympic sprinter
- Zbigniew Syka (1936–1996), sprinter
- Włodzimierz Jastrzębski (born 1939), historian
- Jan Wróblewski (born 1940), glider pilot
- Ekkehard Schulz (born 1941), businessman, ThyssenKrupp CEO
- Jan Lewan (born 1941), singer, portrayed by Jack Black in The Polka King
- Andrzej Przybielski (1944–2011), jazz trumpeter
- Jan Rulewski (born 1944), politician
- Wojciech Gryniewicz (born 1946), sculptor
- Piotr Moss (born 1949), composer
- Jan Kulczyk (1950–2015), businessman and billionaire
- Ryszard Kubiak (1950–2022), rower
- Jan Krzysztof Bielecki (born 1951), Prime Minister of the Republic of Poland
- Mieczysław Cieniuch (born 1951), general
- Grażyna Szapołowska (born 1953), film actress
- Wojciech Mojzesowicz (born 1954), politician
- Marian Sypniewski (born 1955), fencer
- Zbigniew Boniek (born 1956), football player
- Mariusz Klimczyk (born 1956), pole vaulter
- Stefan Majewski (born 1956), football player
- Jan Kaja (born 1957), painter
- Jacek Soliński (born 1957), painter
- Julia Przyłębska (born 1959), President of the Constitutional Tribunal
- Mariusz Kazana (1960–2010), diplomat
- Janusz Turowski (born 1961), football coach
- Marek Leśniewski (born 1963), racing cyclist
- Radosław Sikorski (born 1963), Minister of Foreign Affairs of the Republic of Poland
- Wojciech Zajączkowski (born 1963), diplomat, ambassador to China
- Mirosław Chmara (born 1964), pole vaulter
- Wiesław Tarka (born 1964), diplomat
- Jacek Gollob (born 1969), top speedway rider
- Katarzyna Radtke (born 1969), race walker
- Alicja Pęczak (born 1970), swimmer
- Sebastian Chmara (born 1971), decathlete
- Tomasz Gollob (born 1971), speedway rider
- Robert Sycz (born 1973), rower
- Ewa Kowalkowska (born 1975), volleyball player
- Daniel Stefański (born 1977), football referee
- Robert Wulnikowski (born 1977), football goalkeeper
- Sylwester Szmyd (born 1978), cyclist (road)
- Michał Śledziński (born 1978), cartoonist
- Paweł Olszewski (born 1979), politician
- Filip Dylewicz (born 1980), basketball player
- Caesar Twins (born 1980), theatrical-gymnastics
- Wojciech Gutorski (born 1982), rower
- Wojciech Łobodziński (born 1982), football player
- Michał Winiarski (born 1983), volleyball player
- Piotr Hojka (born 1984), rower
- Beata Mikołajczyk (born 1985), canoer
- Łukasz Michalski (born 1988), pole vaulter
- Iga Baumgart-Witan (born 1989), sprinter
- Paweł Wojciechowski (born 1989), pole vaulter
- Martyna Mikołajczak (born 1991), rower
- Patryk Dudek (born 1992), speedway rider
- Jacek Góralski (born 1992), footballer
- Przemek Karnowski (born 1993), basketball player
- Klaudia Breś (born 1994), sport shooter
- Damian Knyba (born 1996), boxer
- Bedoes (born 1998), rapper and songwriter
- Oskar Repka (born 1999), footballer
- Helena Wiśniewska (born 1999), sprint canoeist
- Katarzyna Dondalska, coloratura soprano
- Agnieszka Stelmaszyk (born 1978), writer, novelist
- Maria Manow (born 1998), vocalist of electronic music duo, Bassvictim

== See also ==
- Bydgoszcz dialect
- Bydgoszcz Architects (1850-1970s)
- Gdańska Street
- Dworcowa Street
- Theatre square
- Freedom Square
- Church of St. John the Apostle and Evangelist in Bydgoszcz
- Grodzka Street
- Nakielska street
- Cieszkowskiego Street
- Independence Estate (Bydgoszcz)
- Jagiellońska street
- Stary Port Street
- Bernardyńska Street
- Podwale Street
- Długa street
- Adam Mickiewicz Alley
- Ossoliński Alley
- Śniadeckich Street
- Pomorska Street
- Focha Street
- Krasińskiego Street
- Bydgoszcz Synagogue, former synagogue in the city
- Roman Catholic Diocese of Bydgoszcz
- Piastowski Square
- Konarskiego Street
- Piotra Skargi Street
- Kołłątaja street in Bydgoszcz
- Gimnazjalna, Libelta and Szwalbego Streets
- Mikołaja Reja Street
- Swiętej Trojcy street
- Kopernika Street
- Krakowska Street
- Osowa Góra
- Flisy (Bydgoszcz district)
- Glinki (Bydgoszcz district)
- Freedom Hill

== Bibliography ==
- Chrzanowski, Bogdan (2022). Polskie Państwo Podziemne na Pomorzu w latach 1939–1945 (in Polish). Gdańsk: IPN. ISBN 978-83-8229-411-8.
- Wardzyńska, Maria (2009). Był rok 1939. Operacja niemieckiej policji bezpieczeństwa w Polsce. Intelligenzaktion (in Polish). Warszawa: IPN.
