= 2013 PLFA season =

- League: PLFA
- Sport: American football

Seasons
- ← 2012 2014 →

The 2013 season of the Polish American Football League was the eighth season played by the american football leagues in Poland.

Regular season of the Topliga took place between March 23 and June 23, 2013. The Polish champion was determined in the play-off final - the VIII SuperFinal PLFA (known as the Polish Bowl VIII). The Giants Wrocław beat the Warsaw Eagles in the championship game 29–13 hosted at the National Stadium in Warsaw.

== Topliga ==
=== Results table ===
Team	Week									
Team	1	2	3	4	5	6	7	8	9	10
Devils Wrocław (DEV)	SPA 56-6	@STE 7-48	GIA 18-27	SEA 34-25	@KOZ 14-33	STE 61-0	REB 41-6	@GIA 25-32	@REB 3-55	@EAG 25-27
Kozły Poznań (KOZ)	EAG 0-39	@REB 4-13	SPA 47-8	@EAG 35-22	STE 39-7	DEV 14-33	@SEA 62-35	@SPA 0-50	SEA 12-14	@GIA 62-0
Warsaw Eagles (EAG)	@KOZ 0-39	SEA 7-20	@STE 7-41	KOZ 35-22	@GIA 9-7	REB 39-0	SPA 71-0	@SEA 20-21	@SPA 0-55	DEV 25-27
Giants Wrocław (GIA)	@REB 0-61	@SEA 32-28	REB 55-13	@DEV 18-27	EAG 9-7	@SPA 0-83	@STE 0-56	DEV 25-32	STE 56-0	KOZ 62-0
Seahawks Gdynia (SEA)	@SPA 0-48	REB 35-6	GIA 32-28	@EAG 7-20	SPA 76-0	@DEV 34-25	@STE 7-42	KOZ 62-35	EAG 20-21	@KOZ 12-14
Silesia Rebels (REB)	GIA 0-61	@SEA 35-6	KOZ 4-13	@GIA 55-13	@STE 20-16	SPA 19-6	@EAG 39-0	@DEV 41-6	STE 22-15	DEV 3-55
Zagłębie Steelers (STE)	@SPA 0-28	DEV 7-48	EAG 7-41	REB 20-16	@KOZ 39-7	SEA 7-42	@DEV 61-0	GIA 0-56	@REB 22-15	@GIA 56-0
Warsaw Spartans (SPA)	SEA 0-48	STE 0-28	@DEV 56-6	@KOZ 47-8	@SEA 75-0	@REB 19-6	GIA 0-83	@EAG 71-0	KOZ 0-50	EAG 0-55

=== Standings ===
North Group
Team	W	L	PTS	PCT	PF	PA	PD
Seahawks Gdynia	8	2	16	.800	374	150	+224
Warsaw Eagles	7	3	14	.700	340	105	+235
Kozły Poznań	4	6	8	.400	232	264	-32
Warsaw Spartans	0	10	0	.000	20	533	-513

South Group
Team	W	L	PTS	PCT	PF	PA	PD
Devils Wrocław	9	1	18	.900	405	138	+267
Giants Wrocław	8	2	16	.800	462	102	+360
Silesia Rebels	2	8	4	.200	89	340	-251
Zagłębie Steelers	2	8	4	.200	91	381	-290

=== Postseason ===
Semi-finals
S1	Devils Wrocław	6
N2	Warsaw Eagles	21
N1	Seahawks Gdynia	12
S2	Giants Wrocław	35

VIII SuperFinał PLFA
S2	Giants Wrocław	29
N2	Warsaw Eagles	13

== PLFA I ==
=== Standings ===
Eastern Group
Team	W	L	PTS	PCT	PF	PA
Lowlanders Białystok	6	0	12	1.000	190	38
Kraków Kings	4	2	8	.667	156	89
Mustangs Płock	1	5	2	.167	45	176
Tytani Lublin	1	5	2	.167	48	136

Western Group
Team	W	L	PTS	PCT	PF	PA
Husaria Szczecin	6	0	12	1.000	123	44
Tychy Falcons	3	3	6	.500	105	73
Gliwice Lions	3	3	6	.500	122	92
Bielawa Owls	0	6	0	.000	32	173

=== Postseason ===
Semi-finals
W1	Husaria Szczecin	44
E2	Kraków Kings	14
E1	Lowlanders Białystok	21
W2	Tychy Falcons	14

PLFA Cup Game I
E1	Lowlanders Białystok	19
W1	Husaria Szczecin	20

== See also ==
- 2013 in sports
