= Polish American Football Association =

Polish American Football Association Polski Związek Futbolu Amerykańskiego
- Successor: American Football Association in Poland
- Formation: November 2004
- Dissolved: 2019
- Type: American football federation
- Headquarters: Warsaw
- Location: Poland
- Members: IFAF, EFAF
- President: Przemysław Kazaniecki
- Website: www.pzfa.pl

The Polish American Football Association or shortly PZFA (Polish: Stowarzyszenie Polski Związek Futbolu Amerykańskiego) was the national American football association in Poland, founded in November 2004.

The PZFA was a full member of the International and European federations. In 2020, it was replaced by the Association of American Football in Poland.

== History ==
The PZFA was created in November 2004, initiated by the first two American football teams: Warsaw Eagles and 1. KFA Wielkopolska (now Fireballs Wielkopolska). Its founding, was a response to the dynamic growth of the American football movement in Poland.

In October 2006, Eagles, Fireballs, Pomorze Seahawks and The Crew Wrocław, create the Polish American Football League (PLFA). Short season was won by the Eagles who beat the Seahawks in the Polish Bowl I.

The second league, PLFA II, was created in the 2008 PLFA season. In the 2011 PLFA season was founded eight-man football league, PLFA 8. In the 2012 PLFA season was founded junior league (14–17 years old), PLFA J and 15 Polish team gets 400 complete sets of equipment for junior players.

== See also ==
- Polish American Football League
