= Fireballs Wielkopolska =

1.KFA Fireballs Wielkopolska
- Founded: 2004
- Based in: Poznań, Poland
- League: Polish American Football League
- Colours: Red and Black

Personnel
- Head coach: Phillip Dillon
- Website: 1kfa.com

The 1.KFA Fireballs Wielkopolska is a Polish American football club from Poznań, Greater Poland Voivodeship, which currently competes in the PLFA II, the second division of Polish American Football League. The Fireballs is one of four founders of the Polish American Football League.

== History ==
The team was founded in July 2004 as the 1.KFA Wielkopolska, which is refers as a First American Football Club in the Wielkopolska. It was the second football team in Poland, after the Warsaw Eagles. In 2006 the Fireballs was one of four founders of the Polish American Football League. Since the 2008 season club is competes in the PLFA II.

== Season-by-season records ==
PLFA champions (2006–2007); PLFA I champions (2008–present)	PLFA II champions (2008–present)	Championship Game appearances

Season	League	Division	Finish	Wins	Losses	Ties	Postseason results	Ref
2006	PLFA	—	4th	0	3	0	Won 3rd place game (The Crew) W.O.	
2007	PLFA	South	3rd	1	5	0	—	
2008	PLFA II	West	1st	6	0	0	Lost semi-final (Torpedy) 14–19	
2009	PLFA II	North	5th	3	3	0	—	
2010	PLFA II	West	3rd	4	2	0	Won wild card (Spartans) 22–18; Lost semi-final (Owls) 14–35; Won 3rd place game (Mustangs) 27–14; Lost barrage (Steelers) 32–37	
2011	PLFA II	North	4th	2	4	0	—	

Note:

* — season in progress

== See also ==
- Sports in Poznań
