= 2012 PLFA season =

- League: PLFA
- Sport: American football

Seasons
- ← 2011 2013 →

The 2012 season of the Polish American Football League was the seventh season played by the american football leagues in Poland. In 2012, the Topliga was created as a major league with a bid (invitation) rule. Remaining teams was divided into two leagues (PLFA I and PLFA II) between which there is promotion and relegation. Both, PLFA I and PLFA II, was divided into two divisions, for the geographical reason.

Regular season of the Topliga took place between March 24 and June 17, 2012. The Polish champion was determined in the play-off final - the VII SuperFinal PLFA (known as the Polish Bowl VII). The Seahawks Gdynia beat the Warsaw Eagles in the championship game 52–37 hosted at the National Stadium in Warsaw.

== Topliga ==
=== Results table ===
Team	Week									
Team	1	2	3	4	5	6	7	8	9	10
Devils Wrocław (DEV)	SEA 27-34	REB 59-0	@KOZ 34-0	@TIG 73-0	EAG 35-32	@REB 59-0	KOZ 7-6	@EAG 27-48	@SEA 28-43	TIG 20-0 wo
Kozły Poznań (KOZ)	@EAG 0-27	@TIG 14-26	DEV 0-34	@SEA 6-48	REB 21-14	TIG 33-12	@DEV 6-7	@REB 14-19	EAG 7-38	SEA 0-41
Warsaw Eagles (EAG)	KOZ 27-0	@SEA 52-22	TIG 68-12	@REB 66-26	@DEV 32-35	SEA 24-34	@TIG 52-0	DEV 48-27	@KOZ 38-7	REB 38-0
Kraków Tigers (TIG)	@REB 6-40	TIG 26-14	@EAG 12-68	DEV 0-73	SEA 12-61	@KOZ 12-33	EAG 0-52	@SEA 16-51	REB 0-65	@DEV 0-20 wo
Seahawks Gdynia (SEA)	@DEV 34-27	EAG 22-52	@REB 49-0	KOZ 48-6	@TIG 61-12	@EAG 34-24	REB 61-19	TIG 51-16	DEV 48-28	@KOZ 41-0
Silesia Rebels (REB)	TIG 40-6	@DEV 0-59	SEA 0-49	EAG 26-66	@KOZ 14-21	DEV 0-59	@SEA 19-61	KOZ 19-14	@TIG 65-0	@EAG 0-38

=== Standings ===
Team	W	L	PTS	PCT	PF	PA	PD
Seahawks Gdynia	9	1	18	.900	444	184	+260
Warsaw Eagles	8	2	16	.800	445	163	+282
Devils Wrocław	7	3	14	.700	369	163	+206
Silesia Rebels	3	7	6	.300	183	373	-190
Kozły Poznań	2	8	4	.200	101	266	-165
Dom-Bud Kraków Tigers	1	9	0	.100	84	477	-393

=== Postseason ===
Semi-finals
1	Seahawks Gdynia	52
4	Silesia Rebels	7
2	Warsaw Eagles	37
3	Devils Wrocław	20

VII SuperFinał PLFA
1	Seahawks Gdynia	52
2	Warsaw Eagles	37

== PLFA I ==
=== Standings ===
North Group
Team	W	L	PTS	PCT	PF	PA
Warsaw Spartans	4	2	8	.667	99	81
Lowlanders Białystok	4	2	8	.667	114	69
Mustangs Płock	2	4	4	.333	95	146
Husaria Szczecin	2	4	4	.333	95	107

South Group
Team	W	L	PTS	PCT	PF	PA
Gliwice Lions	5	1	10	.833	121	63
Zagłębie Steelers	4	2	8	.667	152	72
Bielawa Owls	3	3	6	.500	110	88
Kraków Knights	0	6	0	.000	28	188

=== Postseason ===
Semi-finals
N1	Warsaw Spartans	17
S2	Zagłębie Steelers	0
S1	Gliwice Lions	6
N2	Lowlanders Białystok	12

PLFA Cup Game I
N1	Warsaw Spartans	7
N2	Lowlanders Białystok	6

== PLFA II ==
=== Standings ===
North Group
Team	W	L	PTS	PCT	PF	PA
Królewscy Warszawa	6	0	12	1.000	191	27
Cougars Szczecin	5	1	10	.833	199	29
Sabercats Sopot	4	2	8	.667	178	105
Angels Toruń	2	4	4	.333	74	127
Warsaw Werewolves	1	5	2	.167	26	179
Olsztyn Lakers	0	6	0	.000	20	221

South Group
Team	W	L	PTS	PCT	PF	PA
Tytani Lublin	6	0	12	1.000	191	53
Tychy Falcons	4	2	8	.667	203	80
Saints Częstochowa	4	2	8	.667	169	84
Diabły Wrocław	4	2	8	.667	167	80
Rybnik Thunders	2	4	4	.333	84	180
Ravens Globinit Rzeszów	1	5	2	.167	82	182
Silvers Olkusz	0	6	0	.000	25	262

=== Postseason ===
Semi-finals
S1	Tytani Lublin	20
N2	Cougars Szczecin	12
N1	Królewscy Warszawa	14
S2	Tychy Falcons	57

PLFA II Championship Game
S1	Tytani Lublin	0
S2	Tychy Falcons	42

== See also ==
- 2012 in sports
