= Polish Football League =

American football league in Poland

- Current season, competition or edition: 2026 Polish Football League
- Sport: American football
- Founded: 2021; 5 years ago
- First season: 2021
- CEO: Łukasz Pawlak (president, 2024–2028)
- Administrator: ZFAP
- No. of teams: 13
- Country: Poland
- Most recent champion: Warsaw Eagles (3rd title) (2026)
- Most titles: Warsaw Eagles (3 titles)
- Level on pyramid: Level 1
- Related competitions: Polish Bowl
- Website: polskafutbolliga.pl

The Polish Football League (Polish: Polska Futbol Liga, shortly PFL) is an American football league in Poland. It was formed in 2021, following a merger of the Topliga and the LFA, which had split in 2017. The league is governed by the Związek Futbolu Amerykańskiego w Polsce (ZFAP). The championship game of the league is the Polish Bowl. The inaugural season was held with 7 teams in PFL Division 1 and 7 teams in PFL Division 2.

In the 2024–2028 term, the league is led by president Łukasz Pawlak, with Osman Hózman-Mirza-Sulkiewicz as chairman of the supervisory board.

== History ==
After the 2017 PLFA season, there was a split in the Polish American Football Association. 20 teams, among them 5 from the TopLiga, left the Polish American Football League and founded a new league, the LFA. The two competitions reunited as the PFL in 2021. The first PFL game was played on 17 April 2021 in Tychy, where the Tychy Falcons beat the Warsaw Eagles 41–3. In the first season, seven teams competed in the top division, six of which qualified for the playoffs.

From 2021 to 2024 senior competition was organised in three divisions: PFL 1 (top level), PFL 2 (second level, with promotion to PFL 1) and PFL 9 (a nine-a-side autumn league). Ahead of the 2023 season the Olsztyn Lakers, 2022 PFL 2 champions, and the Jaguars Kąty Wrocławskie were promoted, expanding the top division from six to eight teams.

In 2025 PFL 1 and PFL 2 were replaced by a single senior league of 15 teams split into North and South divisions. The Panthers Wrocław returned to the league after four seasons in the European League of Football. In 2026 the divisions were dropped: 13 teams played in a single table, seeded into three tiers based on 2025 results, with the top eight qualifying for the quarterfinals.

From 2024 to 2026 the Warsaw Eagles won three consecutive Polish Bowls, the first club to do so in the PFL era.

== Results ==
Season	Teams	Polish Bowl	Champions	Score	Runners-up	Venue
2021	7	XVI	Bydgoszcz Archers	27–7	Tychy Falcons	Ząbki
2022	6	XVII	Lowlanders Białystok	21–20	Kraków Kings	Ząbki
2023	8	XVIII	Lowlanders Białystok	38–35	Silesia Rebels	Warsaw
2024	6	XIX	Warsaw Eagles	20–10	Lowlanders Białystok	Warsaw
2025	15	XX	Warsaw Eagles	41–12	Warsaw Mets	Ząbki
2026	13	XXI	Warsaw Eagles	58–40	Panthers Wrocław	Wrocław

=== PFL 2 (2021–2024) ===
Second division, played in spring and summer; discontinued after the 2024 season.

Season	Teams	Champions	Score	Runners-up	Final venue
2021	7	Armia Poznań	29–20	Wilki Łódzkie	Poznań
2022	9	Olsztyn Lakers	58–0	Jaguars Kąty Wrocławskie	Olsztyn
2023	7	Wilki Łódzkie	52–0	Rhinos Wyszków	Konstantynów Łódzki
2024	8	Tychy Falcons	38–7	Rhinos Wyszków	Wyszków

=== PFL 9 (2021–2024) ===
Nine-a-side autumn competition; discontinued after the 2024 season.

Season	Teams	Champions	Score	Runners-up	Final venue
2021	18	Bielawa Owls	42–0	Armada Szczecin	Szczecin
2022	14	Rhinos Wyszków	26–24	Wilki Łódzkie	Sieradz
2023	9	Wataha Zielona Góra	24–6	Miners Wałbrzych	Zielona Góra
2024	8	Miners Wałbrzych	33–14	Tytani Lublin	Lublin

In 2022 the Lithuanian team Dukes Kaunas played in PFL 9, hosting its home games in Suwałki.

=== Youth competitions ===
Final results according to the Polish referees' association match database. In 2026 the junior league was split into U20 and a six-a-side U17 competition.

Season	Category	Champions	Final
2021	PFL J	Lowlanders Białystok	6–0 (OT) vs Angels Toruń
2022	PFL J	Kraków Kings	34–6 vs Panthers Wrocław
2023	PFL J	Panthers Wrocław	34–12 vs Warsaw Mets
2024	PFL J	Warsaw Mets	29–6 vs Panthers Wrocław
2025	PFL J	Warsaw Mets	28–7 vs Panthers Wrocław
2026	U17	Panthers Wrocław Black	27–0 vs Panthers Wrocław Blue
2026	U20	in progress (final on 15 November 2026)	

== 2026 teams ==
Teams were seeded into three tiers based on their 2025 results.

=== Top 6 ===
- Kraków Kings
- Lowlanders Białystok
- Panthers Wrocław
- Silesia Rebels
- Warsaw Eagles
- Warsaw Mets

=== Middle 5 ===
- Armia Poznań
- Jaguars Kąty Wrocławskie
- Olsztyn Lakers
- Tytani Lublin
- Wilki Łódzkie

=== Bottom 2 ===
- Dukes Ząbki
- Wataha Zielona Góra
