= Dabba-Kato =

Polish professional wrestler (born 1988)

- Born: Babatunde Łukasz Aiyegbusi; May 26, 1988 (age 38); Oleśnica, Wrocław Voivodeship, Poland
- Professional wrestling career
- Ring name(s): Babathunder; Babatunde; Babatunde Aiyegbusi; Commander Azeez; Dabba-Kato
- Billed height: 6 ft 9 in (206 cm)
- Billed weight: 350 lb (159 kg)
- Trained by: WWE Performance Center
- Debut: September 30, 2016
- Football career

No. 71, 69
- Position: Offensive tackle

Personal information
- Listed height: 6 ft 9 in (2.06 m)
- Listed weight: 345 lb (156 kg)

Career history
- The Crew Wrocław / Giants Wrocław (2007–2013); Dresden Monarchs (2014–2015); Warsaw Eagles (2015); Minnesota Vikings (2015)*
- * Offseason or practice squad member only

Awards and highlights
- 3x SuperFinał (II, VI, VIII)

Babatunde Łukasz Aiyegbusi (born May 26, 1988) is a Polish professional wrestler and former American football player. He performs on the independent circuit and occasionally for Major League Wrestling (MLW), where he is a former member of Contra Unit, under the ring name Babathunder. He is best known for his tenure with WWE, where he performed under the ring names Dabba-Kato, Babatunde, and Commander Azeez.

Aiyegbusi previously played for a number of teams in the Polish American Football League and German Football League, and had a stint with the Minnesota Vikings during the 2015 preseason.

== Early life and football career ==
Born in Oleśnica, Wrocław Voivodeship (now part of Lower Silesian Voivodeship) in southwestern Poland on May 26, 1988, to a Polish mother and an immigrant Nigerian father, Aiyegbusi began playing American football in 2005 as an offensive lineman. He played in the Polish American Football League for the Giants Wrocław (formerly known as The Crew Wrocław) and the Warsaw Eagles and in the German Football League for the Dresden Monarchs. In 2015, Aiyegbusi was signed by the Minnesota Vikings of the National Football League and he participated in their preseason program, playing three preseason games before being released as part of roster cuts prior to the 2015 NFL season.

== Professional wrestling career ==
=== WWE (2016–2023) ===
On April 12, 2016, Aiyegbusi joined the WWE Performance Center as part of a new class of recruits. He made his professional wrestling debut under his birth name, portraying a face, at a NXT house show in Orlando, Florida, on September 30, 2016, competing in a battle royal. In April 2018, Babatunde started to accompany Lio Rush to the ring at NXT live events until Rush was called up to the main roster as part of 205 Live. Babatunde made his televised debut on April 27 at the Greatest Royal Rumble, entering the match as the 37th entrant and being eliminated by Braun Strowman.

In 2019, Babatunde had several matches for Evolve, a WWE affiliated promotion. During his time in the company, he would challenge for the Evolve Championship.

On August 3, 2020, Babatunde would make his return to television and his Raw debut. He would debut as part of a Raw Underground segment under the ring name Dabba-Kato. He would develop a winning streak on Raw Underground defeating several local wrestlers until he was defeated by Strowman on the September 21 episode of Raw. As part of the 2020 Draft in October, Dabba-Kato was drafted to the Raw brand. However following the draft, he would not make a single appearance on the brand.

On Night 2 of WrestleMania 37 on April 11, 2021, he returned to help Apollo Crews win the Intercontinental Championship from Big E. Crews would then re-introduce him as Commander Azeez the following Friday on SmackDown, with no mention made of his previous time as Dabba-Kato on Raw, thus transferring to the SmackDown brand. As part of the 2021 Draft, both Crews and Azeez were drafted to the Raw brand. In June 2022, Crews and Azeez were sent to NXT and reunited at NXT Vengeance Day. On September 21, 2023, Aiyegbusi was released from his WWE contract.

=== Independent circuit (2024–present) ===
On February 4, 2024, Aiyegbusi made his debut for Prime Time Wrestling (PTW) and later revealed his new ring name to be Babathunder.

== Other media ==
Aiyegbusi, as Commander Azeez, made his video game debut in The Whole Dam Pack DLC for WWE 2K22. He also appeared in WWE 2K23 as the same character.

Aiyegbusi portrayed the villainous Samson in the 2020 film The Main Event.

== Championships and accomplishments ==
- Atomic Legacy Wrestling
  - ALW Tag Team Championship (1 time) – with Jason Dugan

== See also ==
- List of gridiron football players who became professional wrestlers
