= Aki Jones =

American football player (1982–2014)

No. 94
- Position: Defensive end

Personal information
- Born: October 25, 1982; Jamaica, New York
- Died: October 12, 2014 (aged 31); Miami, Florida
- Listed height: 6 ft 4 in (1.93 m)
- Listed weight: 280 lb (127 kg)

Career information
- College: Fordham

Career history
- 2005: Washington Redskins
- Stats at Pro Football Reference

Aki Jones (October 25, 1982 – October 12, 2014) was an American football player, who played in National Football League for Washington Redskins in 2005 season. He signed a 3-year contract to the Washington Redskins as an Undrafted Free Agent at the end of the 2005 NFL draft.

He also played professionally in Europe for several teams, but played in Poland Polish American Football Association and Finland Vaahteraliiga for much of his European career.

Jones played a cameo role in a 2011 Polish comedy Wojna żeńsko-męska (The Female-Male War).

Aki Jones died in car accident in Miami.

== High school ==
=== Christ the King Regional High School ===
Born in Jamaica, New York, Jones initially attended St. John's Prep High School in Queens, NY in 2000. While at St. John's he played only basketball due to them not having a football team. in 2001, his Sophomore year, he transferred to Christ the King Regional H.S in Middle Village, Queens so that he could have the opportunity to play football. His senior year, he received All-City and All League Honors. Jones was selected to play in CHSFL (Catholic High School Football League) All-Star game and represented New York City in the annual NYC vs Long Island Outback Steakhouse Empire Challenge.

=== Deerfield Academy ===
Jones attended Deerfield Academy in Deerfield, Massachusetts for a postgraduate year. While at Deerfield he played varsity football, basketball and track and field. In his first year of track and field Jones placed 5th in New England's Regional Meet in the discus and shot put.

== College career ==
In 2001 Jones attended Fordham University in the Bronx, New York. Jones contribute on both O Line and D Line his freshman year. Jones was a starter his junior and senior year. In 2003 Jones received First-team All-Patriot League Honors. During his senior year, he received Lindy's Pre-Season 1-AA Second-team All-American and Second-team All-Patriot League Honors. Jones finished his career at Fordham with a 2002 Patriot League Championship and team leader in sacks for three consecutive years 2002, 2003, and 2004. He graduated from the Gabelli School of Business in 2009.

== NFL ==
Jones signed with the Washington Redskins as an undrafted free agent in April 2005. Jones spent the opening day roster on the practice squad but was elevated to active roster by week 2. Jones appeared in his first game on November 6, 2005, against the Philadelphia Eagles where he registered his first tackle. In the 2005 NFL season he played in four games which remains his only season.

== European career ==
In March 2007, Jones moved to Poland where he worked as President/Creator of the Super Flag Bol league in Wrocław, which is the first junior high school flag football league in Poland.

Jones was also a player for The Crew Wrocław an American football club in the Polish American Football League. He also played for the Warsaw Eagles in Poland's top league.

In 2011, he moved to Sweden and joined the Arlanda Jets, who play in the Swedish Superserien.

In 2013, he signed with Turku Trojans who play in the Vaahteraliiga Maple League the top level in Finland.

In 2013, he moved to Brazil and declared to participate in the LFA, which is the Brazilian NFL.

During the summer, he joined the Turku Trojans for the 2014 season, the Trojans were then playing in the Finnish 1st division, the second highest level league in Finland.

Jones had returned from Europe prior to his death, and had taken a position as a Group Sales Account Executive with the Miami Dolphins.

He died in a car accident in October 2014.
