= Micah Brown =

American gridiron football player (born 1986)

No. 3 – Halifax Harbour Hawks
- Position: Quarterback
- Roster status: Injured reserve

Personal information
- Born: June 12, 1986 (age 40); Staten Island, New York, U.S.
- Listed height: 5 ft 10 in (1.78 m)
- Listed weight: 182 lb (83 kg)

Career information
- High school: TBT (FL); Blake (FL)
- College: SMU Huskies; Saint Paul's

Career history
- Halifax Harbour Hawks (2018–present); Lazio Marines (2017) Italy; Helsinki Roosters (2015–2016); Seahawks Gdynia (2015); Marburg Mercenaries (2013–2014); West Texas Roughnecks (2012); U.S. National Team (IFAF 2011); Basel Meanmachine (2009) Swiss National B League; Wernigerode Mountain-Tigers (2008) German Regional League (third division)

Awards and highlights
- Maple Bowl XVIV 2016 champion; Maple Bowl XVIII 2015 champion; PLFA Super Final X 2015 champion; Touchdown Europe Hall of Fame; World champion 2011; AUS Loney Bowl champion 2010

Olympic medal record

Men's American football

Representing United States

World Championship
Gold medal – first place	2011 Austria	Team competition

Micah Brown (born June 12, 1986) is an American former professional football quarterback. He owns BATLX, a football-specific training and athletic development facility and the Halifax Harbour Hawks football program. Brown has played in the German Football League (GFL), the United States national American football team and Canadian University Football for the Saint Mary's Huskies.

== High school ==
Born in Staten Island, NY, Brown moved to Tampa, FL and initially attended Tampa Bay Technical High School from 2000 to 2003. While at TBT (FL) he played basketball in addition to football. In the spring of 2003, his junior year, he transferred to Howard W. Blake High School. His junior and senior years he received All-District and All-County Honors along with Gatorade Player of the Year, Wendy's High School Heisman Award and the Elite 11 nominations.

== Education ==
- Master's North American Studies from University of Marburg Germany
- Bachelor's Art Psychology & Sociology from Saint Mary's University (Halifax) Canada
- Bachelor's Science Marketing & Management from Saint Paul's College (Virginia)

== Professional career ==
Brown was allocated to the Roosters in July 2015 a day after winning the Polish Super Final X with the Seahawks Gdynia. Prior to his time in Poland, Brown was the offensive coordinator in addition to his role as quarterback, in Germany with the Marburg Mercenaries, where he kept the team in championship contention reaching the playoffs in the German Football League each his two years there.

Brown was introduced to Marburg through a former teammate on the U.S. National Team, which won Gold in the World Championship 2011 in Austria.
