= Lowlanders Białystok =

- Founded: 2006
- Based in: Białystok, Poland
- Home field: Municipal Stadium
- Head coach: John Douglas Harper
- League: Polish Football League
- Colours: Yellow and Black
- Polish Bowl: 2018, 2022, 2023
- Website: lowlanders.pl

The Lowlanders Białystok is an American football team based in Białystok, Poland. They play in the Polish Football League.

== History ==
The team joined to the PLFA II in 2008 PLFA season. Lowlanders won the PLFA II and was promoted to the PLFA I. In the 2009 PLFA season Lowlanders lost all games (including barrage against Kraków Tigers) and were relegated to the second league. In the 2010 PLFA season team lost the PLFA II Final and were promoted to the PLFA I.

On May 8, 2011 the Lowlanders won first game in the PLFA against Kozły Poznań 18–12. Lowlanders lost other games and were relegated.

The team made it to the semifinals of the Polish American Football League playoffs twice in 2015 and 2016. After the 2017 season, the Lowlanders left the Polish American Football League and joined the new Liga Futbolu Amerykańskiego.

== Season-by-season records ==
PLFA champions (2006–2007); PLFA I champions (2008–2011); PLFA Topliga (2012–present)	PLFA II champions (2008–2011); PLFA I champions (2012–present)	Championship Game appearances

Season	League	Division	Finish	Wins	Losses	Ties	Postseason results	Ref
2008	PLFA II	North	1st	5	1	0	Won the Final (Torpedy) 20–0	
2009	PLFA I	—	8th	0	7	0	Lost barrage (Tigers) 14–30	
2010	PLFA II	East	1st	5	1	0	Lost the Final (Owls) 12–27	
2011	PLFA I	—	10th	1	8	0	—	
2012	PLFA I	North	2nd	4	2	0	Lost the Final (Spartans) 6-7	
2013	PLFA I	East	1st	6	0	0	Lost the Final (Husaria) 19-20	

== See also ==
- Sports in Białystok
