= 2006 PLFA season =

- League: PLFA
- Sport: American football

Seasons
- ← 2005 2007 →

The 2006 season of the Polish American Football League (PLFA) was the 1st season played by the major american football league in Poland. Regular season play was held from October 8 to November 5, 2006. The Polish champion title was eventually won by the Warsaw Eagles when they defeated the Pomorze Seahawks; the Polish Bowl championship game, at Marymont stadium in Warsaw, Masovian Voivodeship on November 12.

== Regular season ==
=== Results table ===
Team	Game					
Team	1	2	3	4	5	6
Warsaw Eagles (EAG)	FIR	—	—	@CRE	@SEA	—
Warsaw Eagles (EAG)	66-6	—	—	25-6	19-6	—
Seahawks Gdynia (SEA)	—	FIR	@CRE	—	EAG	—
Seahawks Gdynia (SEA)	—	51-6	26-22	—	6-19	—
The Crew Wrocław (CRE)	—	—	SEA	EAG	—	@FIR
The Crew Wrocław (CRE)	—	—	22-26	6-25	—	20-0
Fireballs Wielkopolska (FIR)	@EAG	@SEA	—	—	—	CRE
Fireballs Wielkopolska (FIR)	6-66	6-51	—	—	—	0-20

=== Standings ===
Team	W	L	PTS	PCT	PF	PA
Warsaw Eagles	3	0	6	1.000	110	18
Pomorze Seahawks	2	1	4	0.667	83	47
The Crew Wrocław	1	2	2	0.333	48	51
Fireballs Wielkopolska	0	3	0	0.000	18	137

== Postseason ==
=== Third place match ===
Third placed team after the regular season, The Crew Wrocław, did not participate in match due to financial reasons. After a walkover, third place was won by Fireballs Wielkopolska.

=== Polish Bowl I ===
Polish Bowl I: Eagles 34, Seahawks 6

Quarter	1	2	3	4	Total
Pomorze Seahawks	6	0	0	0	6
Warsaw Eagles	6	18	3	7	34

at Marymont stadium

- Date: November 12, 2006
- Game attendance: 1,300

Game information

Scoring
for the Eagles:

- A. Zając – 6 pts (pass from J.Stęszewski)
- A. Nawrocki – 6 pts (run)
- M. Włodarczyk – 6 pts (fumble recovered in the end zone)
- P. Osuchowski – 6 pts (run)
- J. Stęszewski – 6 pts (run)
- P. Gorzkowski – 4 pts (field goal and PAT)

for the Seahawks:

- K. Toruński – 6 pts (fumble recovered in the end zone)

Awards

- MVP: #86 Adam Zając, WR, CB (Eagles)

== See also ==
- 2006 in sports
