= Sports in Białystok =

This is a sub-article to Białystok

Białystok has a number of sports teams, both professional and amateur, and a number of venues across the city. Jagiellonia Białystok is a Polish football club, based in Białystok, in the Ekstraklasa League that plays at the Białystok Municipal Stadium. Jagiellonia Białystok won the Polish Cup in 2010, Super Cup and qualified to play in the third round qualification of the UEFA Europa League. A new 22,500 seat stadium was completed at the end of 2014.

Hetman Białystok (formerly known as Gwardia Bialystok) is a Polish football club based in Podlaskie Voivodeship. They play in the Division IV or the (4th) League at the Białystok Municipal Stadium.

Lowlanders Białystok is a football club, based in Białystok, that plays in the Polish American Football League (Polish: Polska Liga Futbolu Amerykańskiego) PLFA I Conference. The Lowlanders were the champions of the PLFA II Conference in 2010 with a perfect season (8 wins in eight meetings). Because of the win they were advanced to the upper conference (PLFA I) in 2011.

Club	Sport	Founded	League	Venue	Head Coach
Jagiellonia Białystok	Football	1920	Ekstraklasa	Białystok Municipal Stadium	Michał Probierz
KS Włókniarz Białystok	Football	1947	Fourth League	Włókniarz Białystok Stadium	Artur Dakowicz
Hetman Białystok	Football	1948	Fourth League	Białystok Municipal Stadium	Andrzej Pietrzyk
KKS Piast Białystok	Football	1997	Fourth League	?	Jacek Bayer
AZS Białystok	Volleyball	1998	Polish Women's-Volleyball League	Sports hall SP No 50	Wiesław Czaja
PKK Żubry Białystok	Basketball	2003	Third League	Public Gymnasium No 18	Marek Kubiak
Lowlanders Białystok	American football	2006	PLFA	Białystok Municipal Stadium	Łukasz Lewandowski, Tomasz Żukowski
UKS Wygoda Białystok	Cycling	?	Polish Cycling Federation	?	Wiesław Grabek
Jagiellonia Judo Club Bialystok	Judo	?	Polski Związek Judo	Elementary school No 44	Marcin Orłowski, Jarosław Kazberuk, Cezary Kazberuk
HUMAN Białystok	Kickboxing	?	Polski Związek Kickboxingu	?	?

== Sport Clubs and Organizations ==
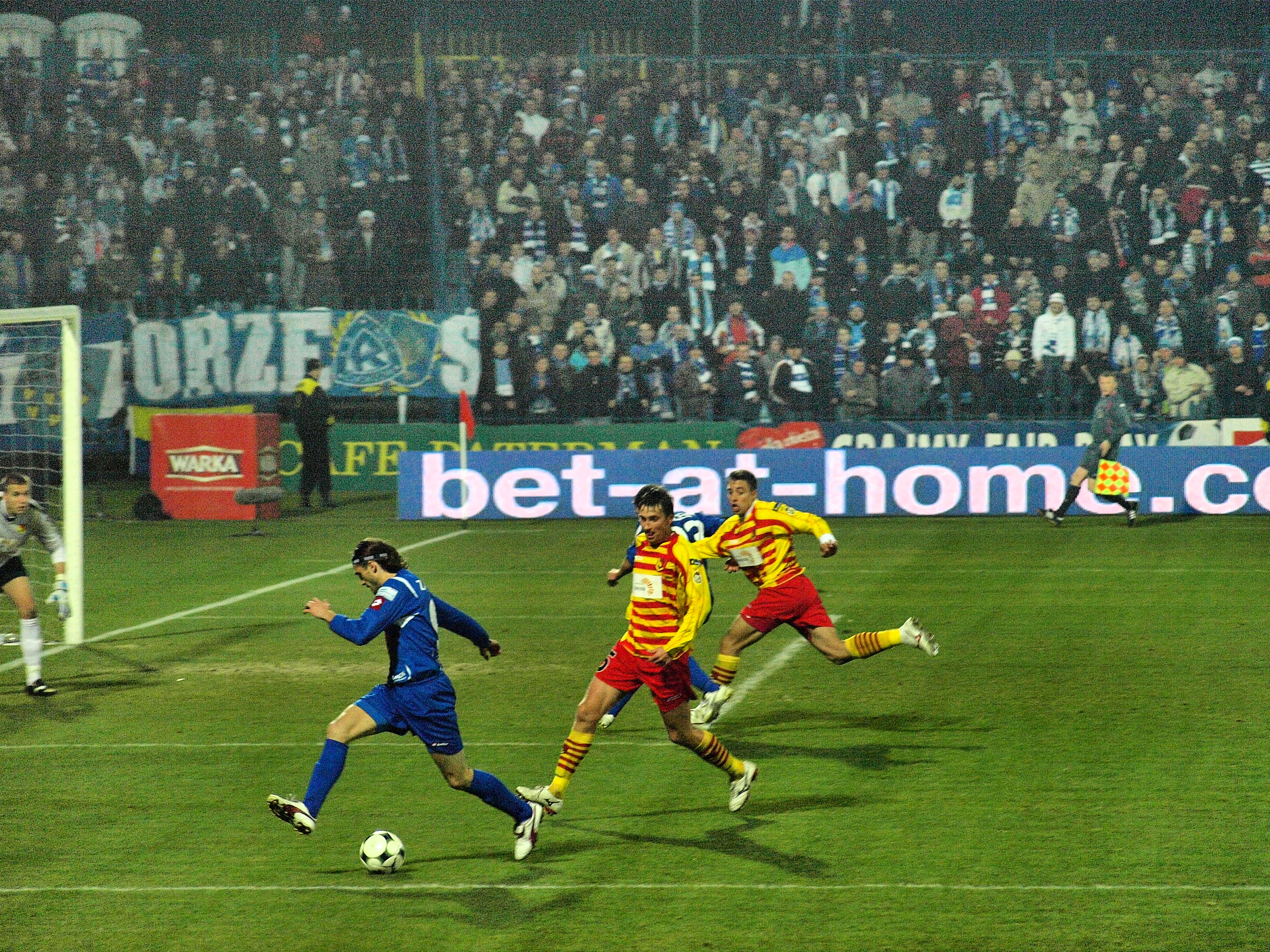
Jagiellonia Białystok v Ruch Chorzów (09.11.2009)

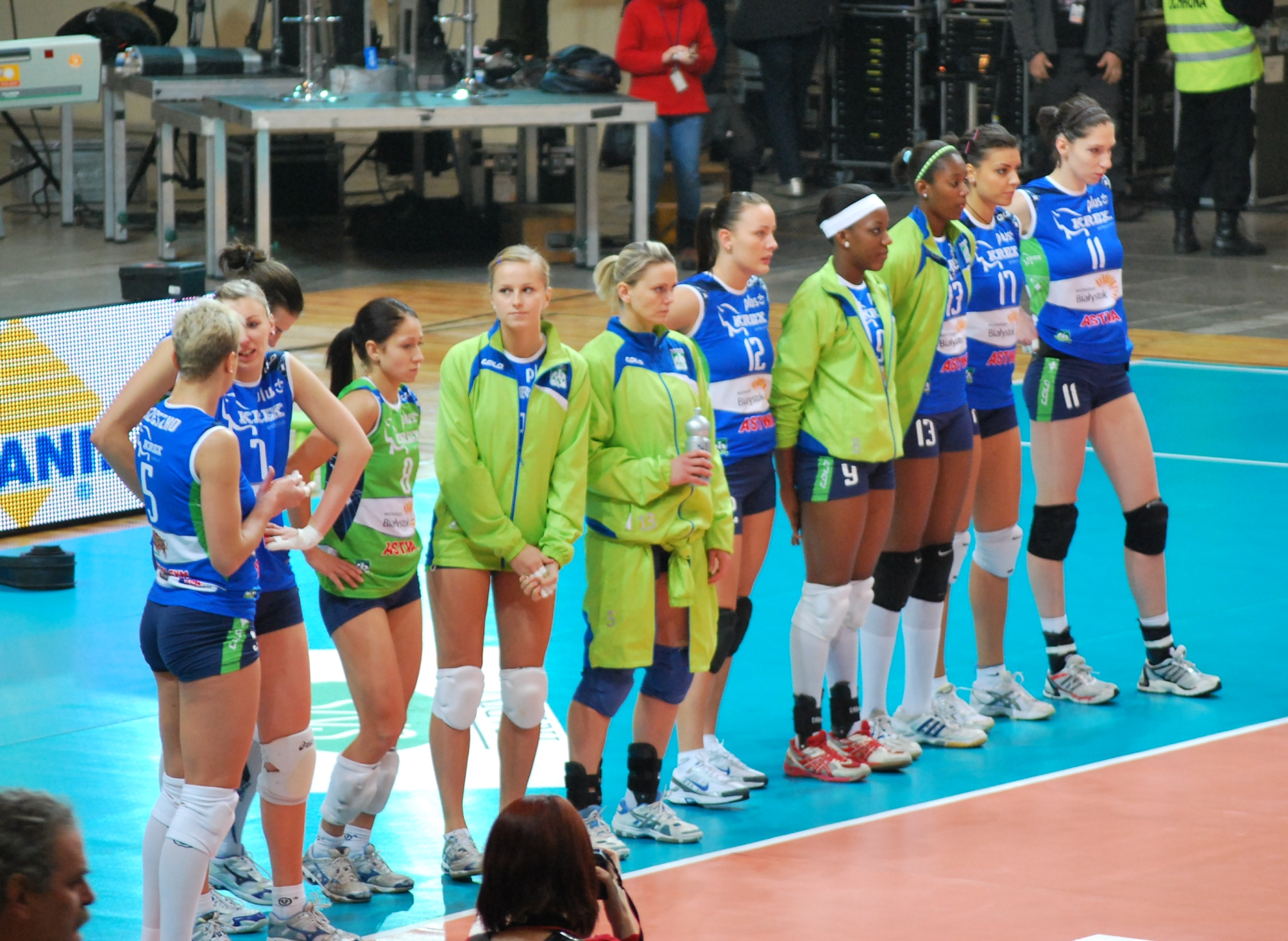
AZS Białystok

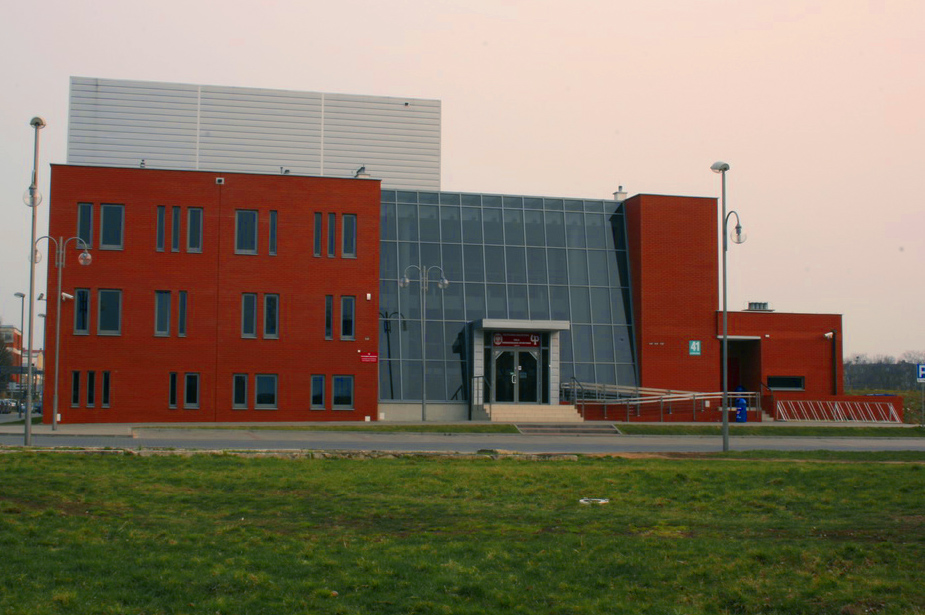
Sports and Entertainment Arena (Białystok Technical University)

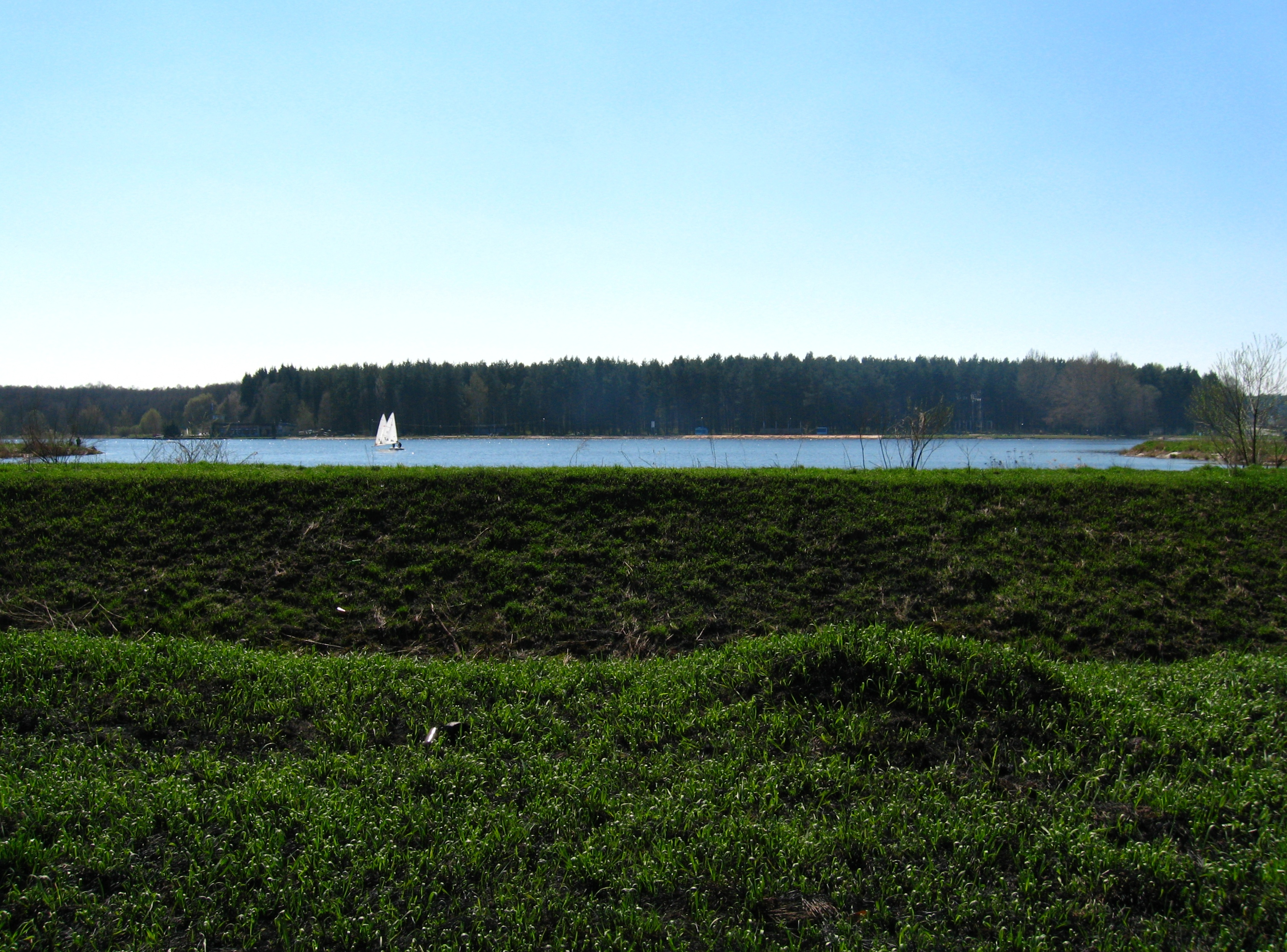
Ponds Dojlidzkie

- AZS PB
- AZS WSAP
- Aeroklub Białostocki
- Automobilklub Podlaski
- Zakładowy Klub Sportowy "Instal"
- Miejski Ośrodek Sportu i Rekreacji
- Podlaski Klub Taekwondo "So-san"
- Białostocki Ośrodek Japońskich Sztuk Walki "SHOBUKAI"
- Białostocka Drużyna Hokeja na lodzie "ADH Białystok"
- Podlaskie Stowarzyszenie Sportu Osób Niepełnosprawnych "Start" Białystok
- Rowerowy Białystok, cycling association, PTR Dojlidy– MTB Sport Team .
- Makabi Bialystok was a between—the—world—wars Jewish multi—sport club (soccer, basketball and track and field were just a few of types of sport practiced at the club)

== Sports Facilities ==
Stadiums and sports halls

- Białystok Municipal Stadium
- Athletic stadium MOSiR
- Stadium KS Włókniarz
- Stadium KKS Ognisko
- Sports and Entertainment Arena at Bialystok Technical University
- Sports Arena at Medical University

Pools

- MOSiR (Mazowiecka street, Włókiennicza street, Stroma street) (Covered)
- Interschool Sports Centre (Covered)
- BKS Hetman (open)
- Hotel Gołębiewski (swimming trophy "tropicana")

Tennis Courts

- Tennis Courts "Richi"
- Tennis Courts at Bialystok Technical University
- Tennis Courts Tennis Association "Stanley"
- Tennis Courts MOSiR

other

- Driver training track (Tor Wschodzący Białystok)
- Sports Club (Ośrodek Sportów Wodnych "Dojlidy")
- Children's Center FIKOLAND & RE-kreacja
- Sport and Recreation Centre "Maniac Gym"
- Skatepark
- Rink (during the summer rolls) MOSiR
- Shooting Range LOK
