= Zagłębie =

Zagłębie in Polish means coalfield. It can refer to:

- Górnośląskie Zagłębie Węglowe, a mining region
- Zagłębie Dąbrowskie, a mining region
- Zagłębie Sosnowiec, an association football club
- Zagłębie Lubin, an association football club
- Zagłębie Wałbrzych, an association football club
- Zagłębie Steelers, a Polish club of American football
- KH Zagłębie Sosnowiec an ice hockey club
- MKS Zagłębie Lubin, a women's handball team
