= 2007 PLFA season =

- League: PLFA
- Sport: American football

Seasons
- ← 2006 2008 →

The 2007 season of the Polish American Football League (PLFA) was the 2nd season played by the major american football league in Poland. Regular season play was held from April 14 to September 23, 2007. The Polish champion title was eventually won by The Crew Wrocław when they defeated the AZS Silesia Miners; the Polish Bowl championship game, at Marymont stadium in Warsaw, Masovian Voivodeship on October 14.

== Regular season ==
=== Northern Division ===
Team	W	L	PTS	PCT	PF	PA
#2 Pomorze Seahawks	5	1	10	0.833	188	65
Zachodniopomorska Husaria	2	4	4	0.333	80	105
Kozły Poznań	1	5	2	0.167	58	146

=== Central Division ===
Team	W	L	PTS	PCT	PF	PA
#1 Warsaw Eagles	6	0	12	1.000	199	14
#4 AZS Silesia Miners	4	2	8	0.667	141	78
Sioux Kraków Tigers	0	6	0	0.000	30	278

=== Southern Division ===
Team	W	L	PTS	PCT	PF	PA
#3 The Crew Wrocław	5	1	10	0.833	178	73
Devils Wrocław	3	3	6	0.500	146	86
Fireballs Wielkopolska	1	5	2	0.167	35	210

== Playoffs ==
Three division winners and one runner-up was qualify to the play-offs.

=== Bracket ===
Semi-finals
1	Warsaw Eagles	13
4	Silesia Miners	16
2	Pomorze Seahawks	2
3	The Crew Wrocław	18

II PLFA Final
4	Silesia Miners	0
3	The Crew Wrocław	18

=== Semi-finals ===
- September 22, Sopot

Seahawks vs. The Crew 2:18

- September 30, Żyrardów

Eagles vs. Miners 13:16

=== Polish Bowl II ===
- October 14, 2006
- Warsaw
- Marymont stadium
- Attendance: ?
- MVP: Paweł Wojcieszak (The Crew)

Team	1	2	3	4	Total
AZS Silesia Miners	0	0	0	0	0
The Crew Wrocław	8	8	0	2	18

== See also ==
- 2007 in sports
