= Bielawa Owls =

- Founded: 2007
- Based in: Bielawa, Poland
- Head coach: Przemysław Klinger
- League: Liga Futbolu Amerykańskiego
- Colours: Blue and White
- Mascot(s): Owlie
- Website: owls.bielawa.pl

The Bielawa Owls are an American football team located in Bielawa, Poland. They play in the Liga Futbolu Amerykańskiego.

== History ==
The team was founded in December 2007 by Przemysław Klinger. In 2010, they won the PLFA II championship and were promoted to the PLFA I.

== Season-by-season records ==
PLFA champions (2006–2007); PLFA I champions (2008–present)	PLFA II champions (2008–present)	Championship Game appearances

Season	League	Division	Finish	Wins	Losses	Ties	Postseason results	Ref
2008	PLFA II	West	2nd	2	4	0	—	
2009	PLFA II	South	3rd	4	2	0	Won wildcard (Mustangs) 26–6; Lost semi-final (Tigers) 0–24; Lost 3rd placed game (Torpedy) 14–20	
2010	PLFA II	West	1st	6	0	0	Won semi-final (Fireballs) 35–14; Won the Final (Lowlanders) 27–12	
2011	PLFA I	—	7th	3	6	0	—	
