= General Kazimierz Sosnkowski Municipal Stadium =

Football stadium in Warsaw

Coordinates: 52°15′19.86″N 21°0′4.76″E

- Konwiktorska 6 Polonia Warsaw Stadium
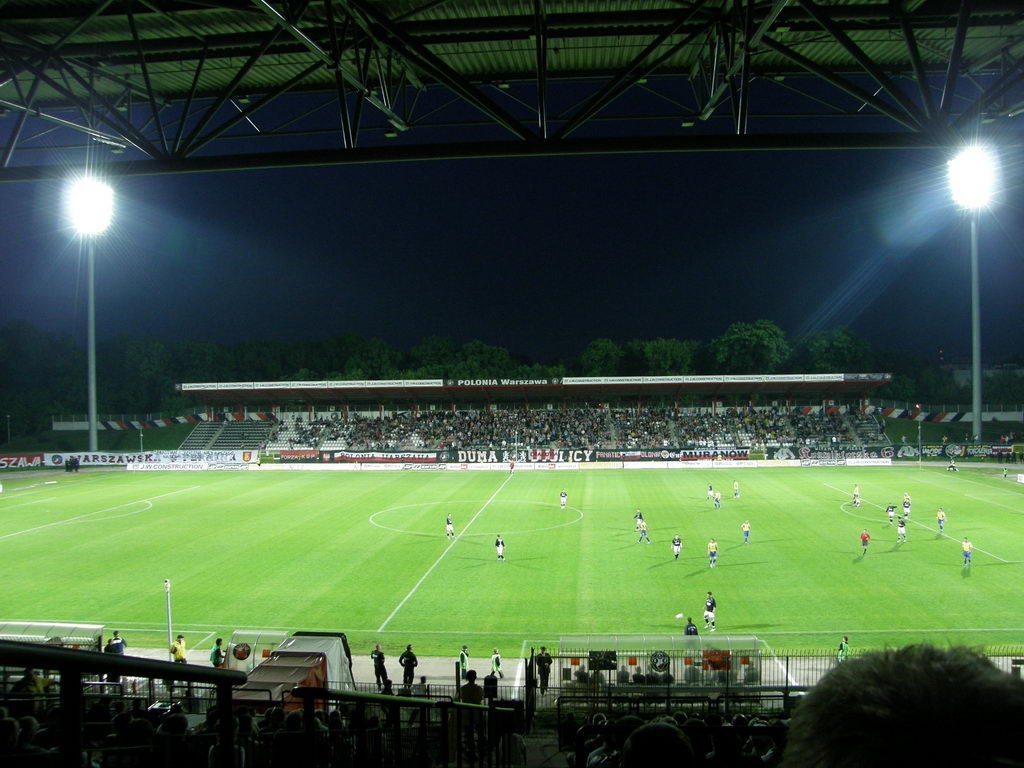
- Interactive map of General Kazimierz Sosnkowski Municipal Stadium
- Location: ul. Konwiktorska 6 Muranów, Warsaw, Poland
- Owner: City of Warsaw
- Operator: Warsaw Sports and Recreation Center
- Capacity: 6,852 (seating only)
- Surface: Grass
- Field size: 106m x 74m
- Public transit: Dworzec Gdański

Construction
- Opened: September 30, 1928

Tenants
- Polonia Warsaw; Polonia Warsaw II; Warsaw Eagles

The General Kazimierz Sosnkowski Municipal Stadium (Polish: Stadion Miejski im. gen. Kazimierza Sosnkowskiego) or Polonia Warsaw Stadium (Polish: Stadion Polonii Warszawa), known colloquially as K6, is a multi-purpose stadium in Warsaw, Poland.

It is currently used mostly for football matches, and is the home ground of Polonia Warsaw. The stadium was originally built in 1928. The East stand was thoroughly modernized in 2004.

The stadium was used as a training ground for UEFA Euro 2012, and is being upgraded to hold a larger audience. It currently holds 6,852 seats, subdivided as follows.

== Stadium stands ==
1. The main stand (capacity: 4,889 seats) is the best seating for any sports event held at the stadium, fully covered and considerably high.
2. The east stand (concrete; capacity: 1,611 seats), popularly called trybuna kamienna (the "stone stand"), is the historic stand with steps made of stone, originally with standing room only. In 2004, the stand was fully reconstructed with overhead cover.
3. The special guests' sector (capacity: 352 seats). Originally built for around 500 persons, in August 2009 it was fitted with only 352 seats. The sector lies at the north side of the stadium, near the ul. Międzyparkowa (street).

== Additional tenants ==
Since 2013 the stadium is a home venue for American football team Warsaw Eagles.

It is also a home for the Polonia Warsaw reserve team.

== Gallery ==
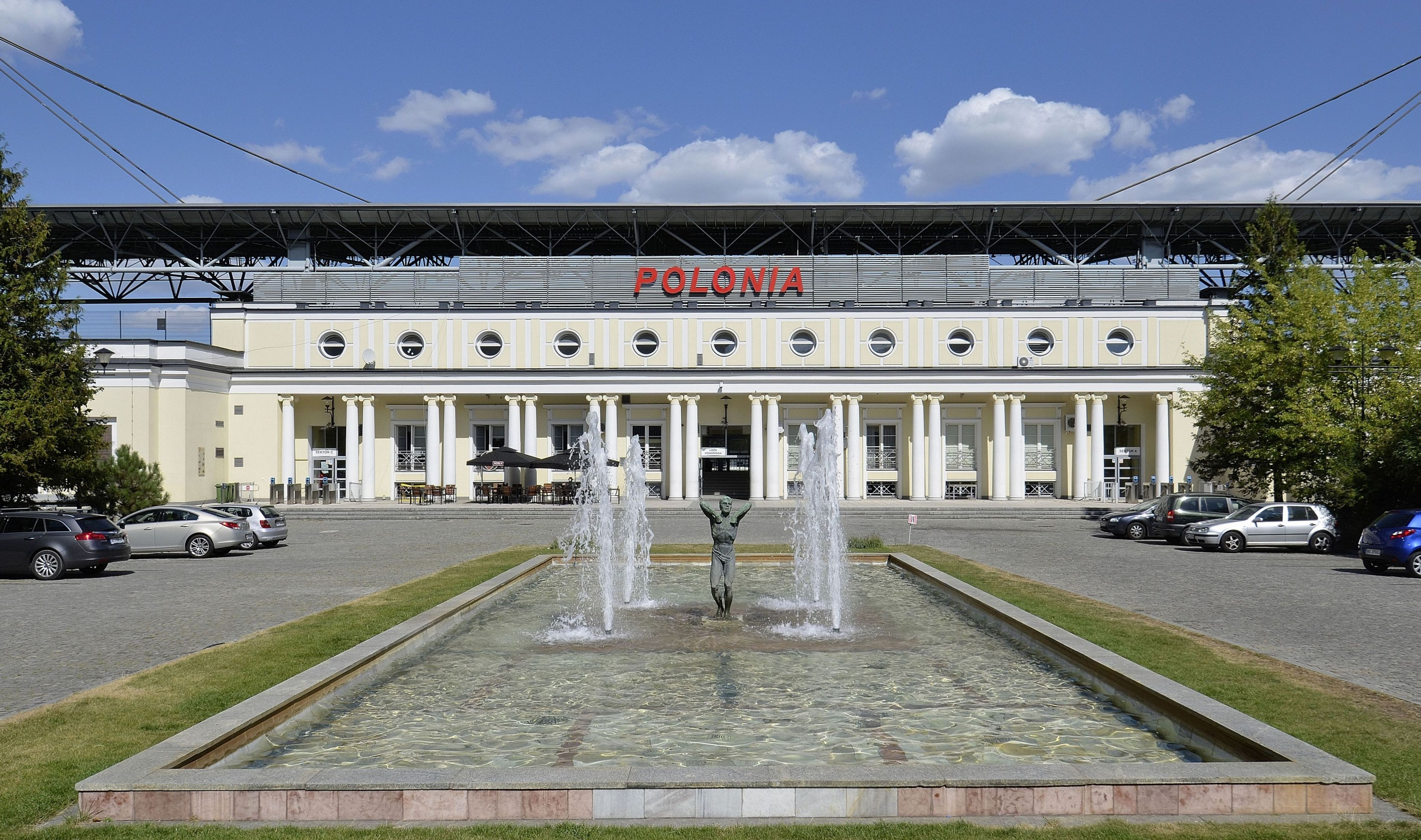
Front view of the stadium's entrance in August of 2015

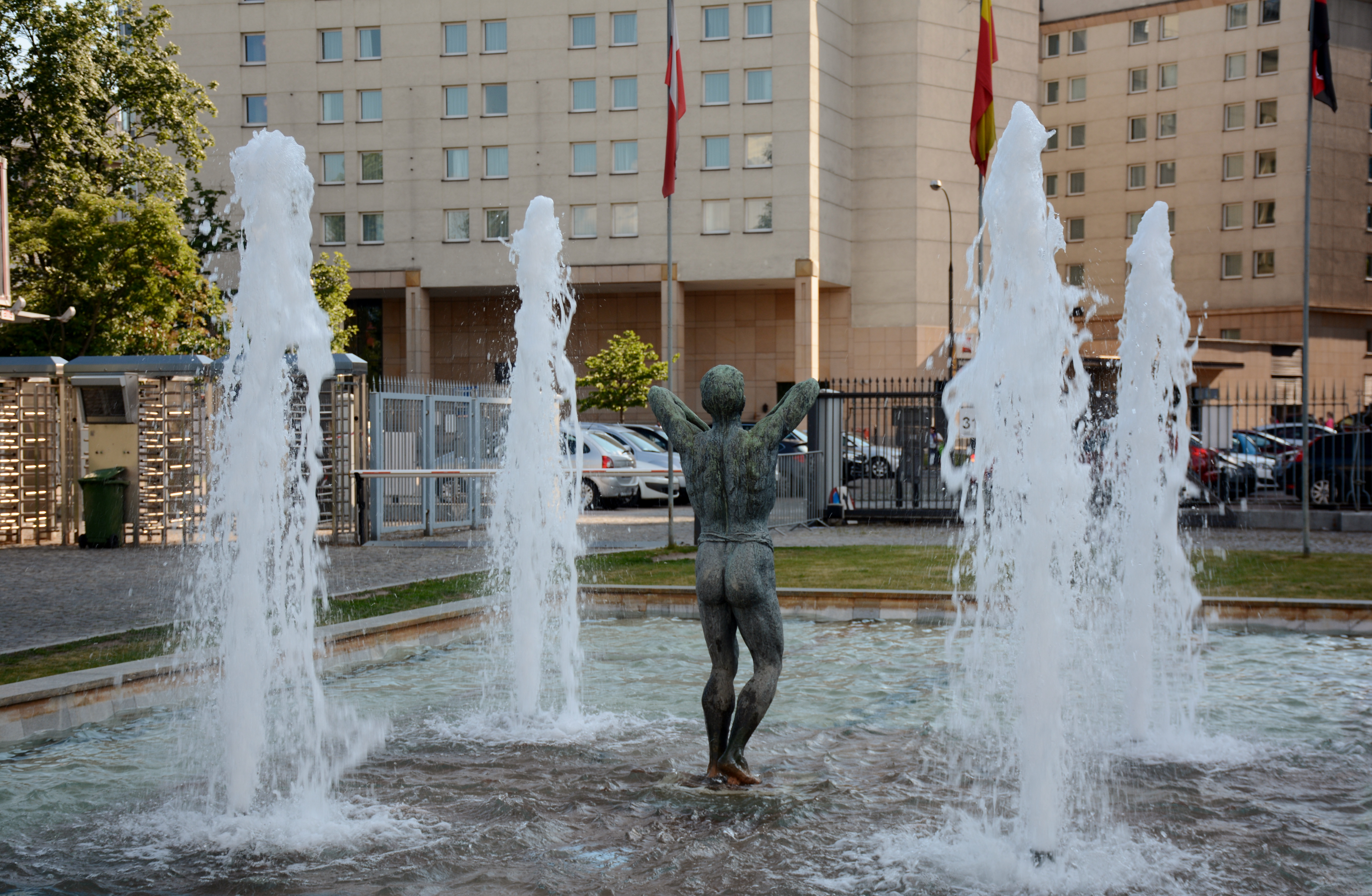
View of the fountain from the back, June 2016

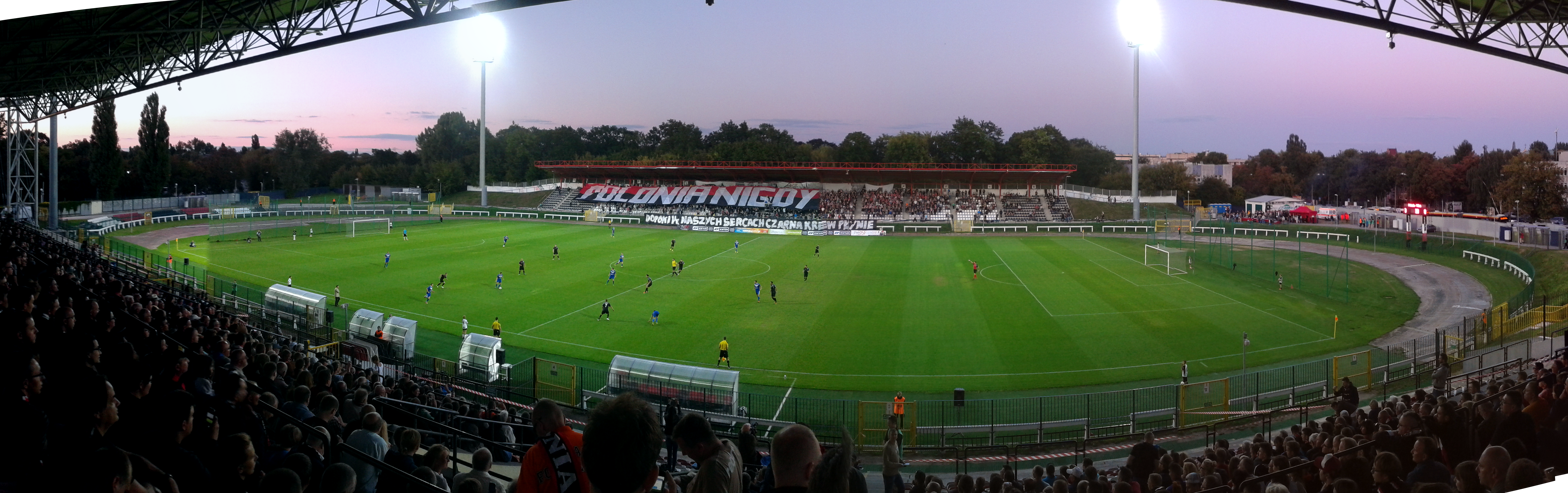
Panorama of the stadium from 2013

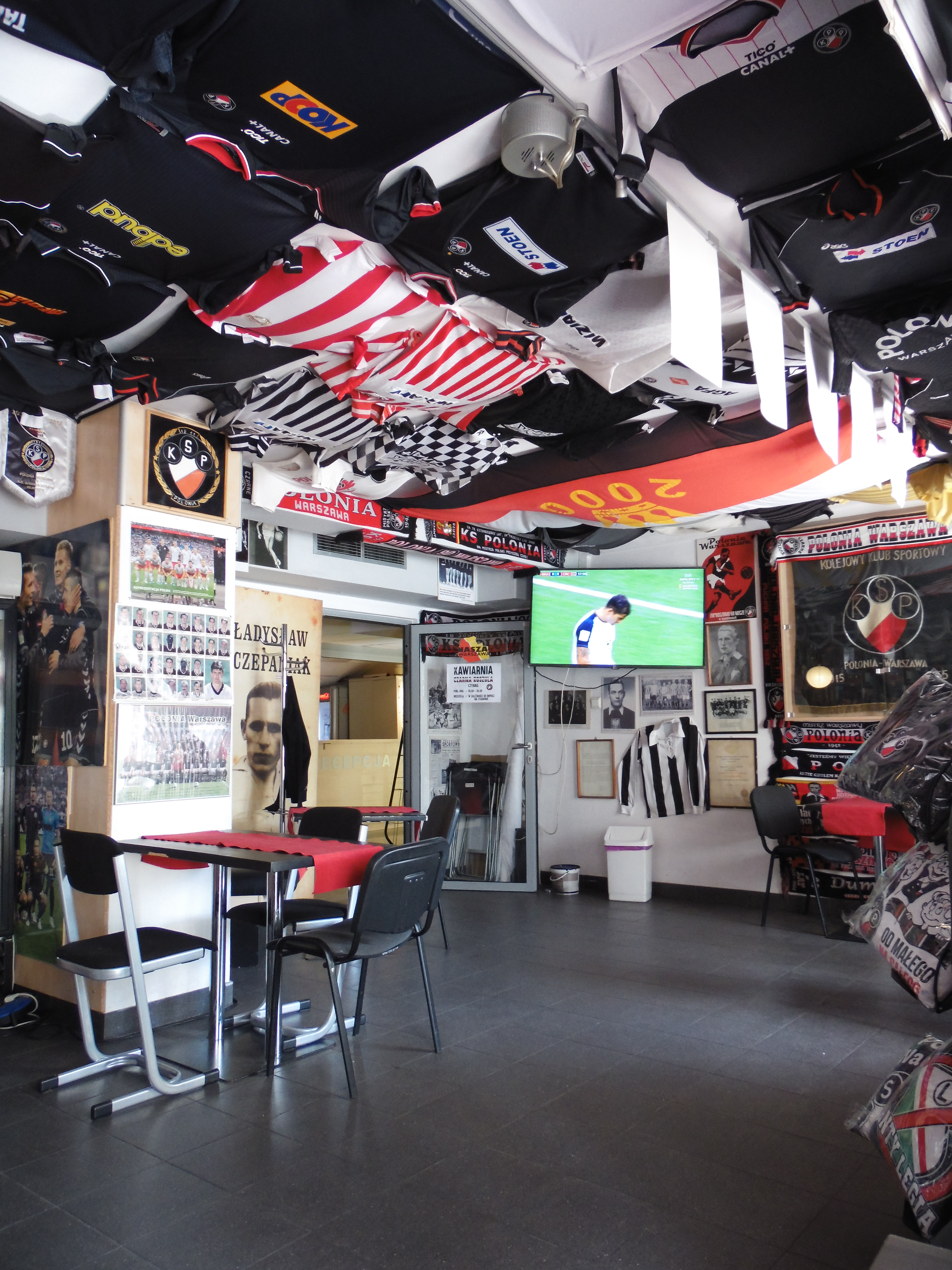
Czarna Koszula ("Black Shirt") bar located inside the stadium

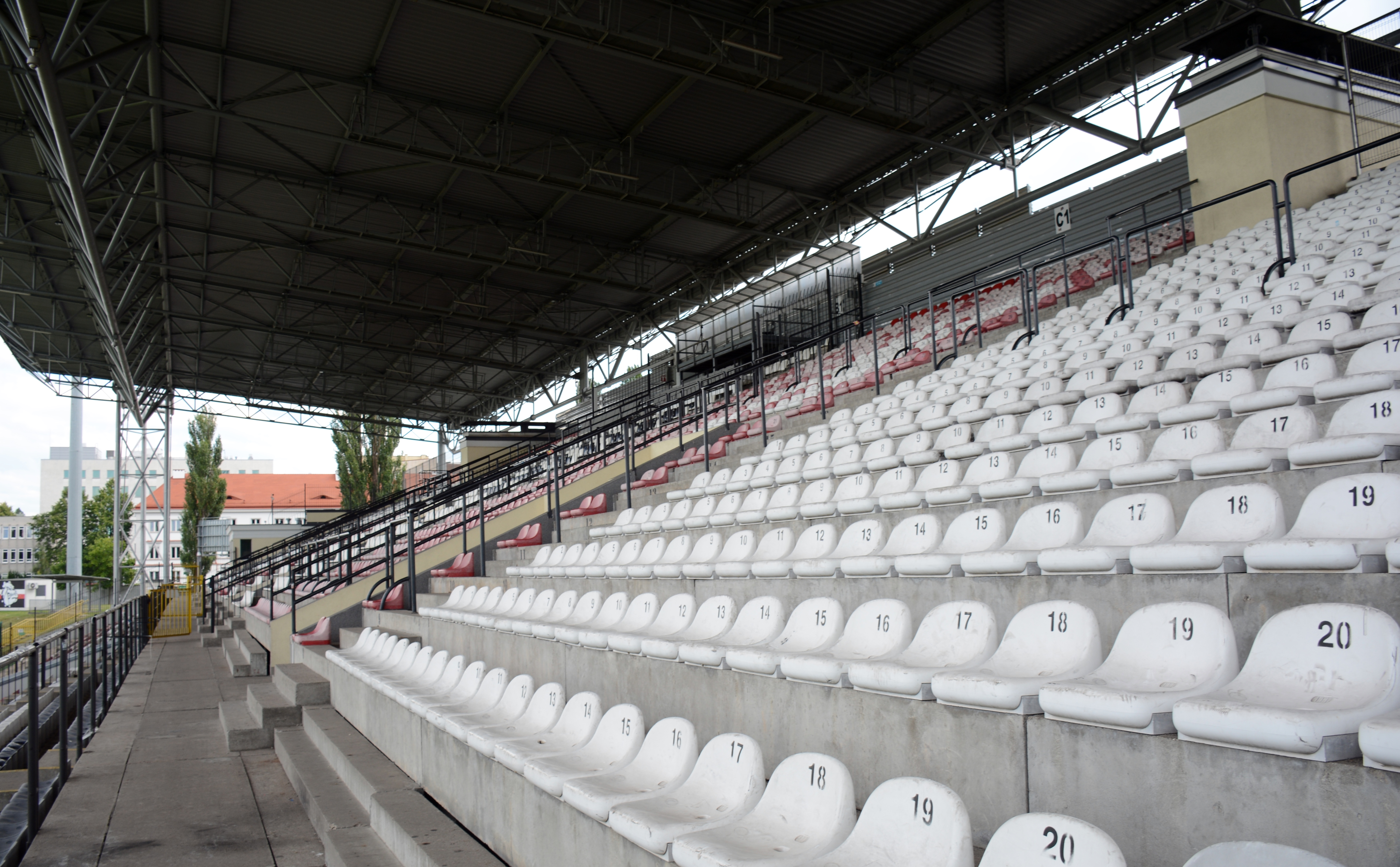
Stadium seats, June 2016

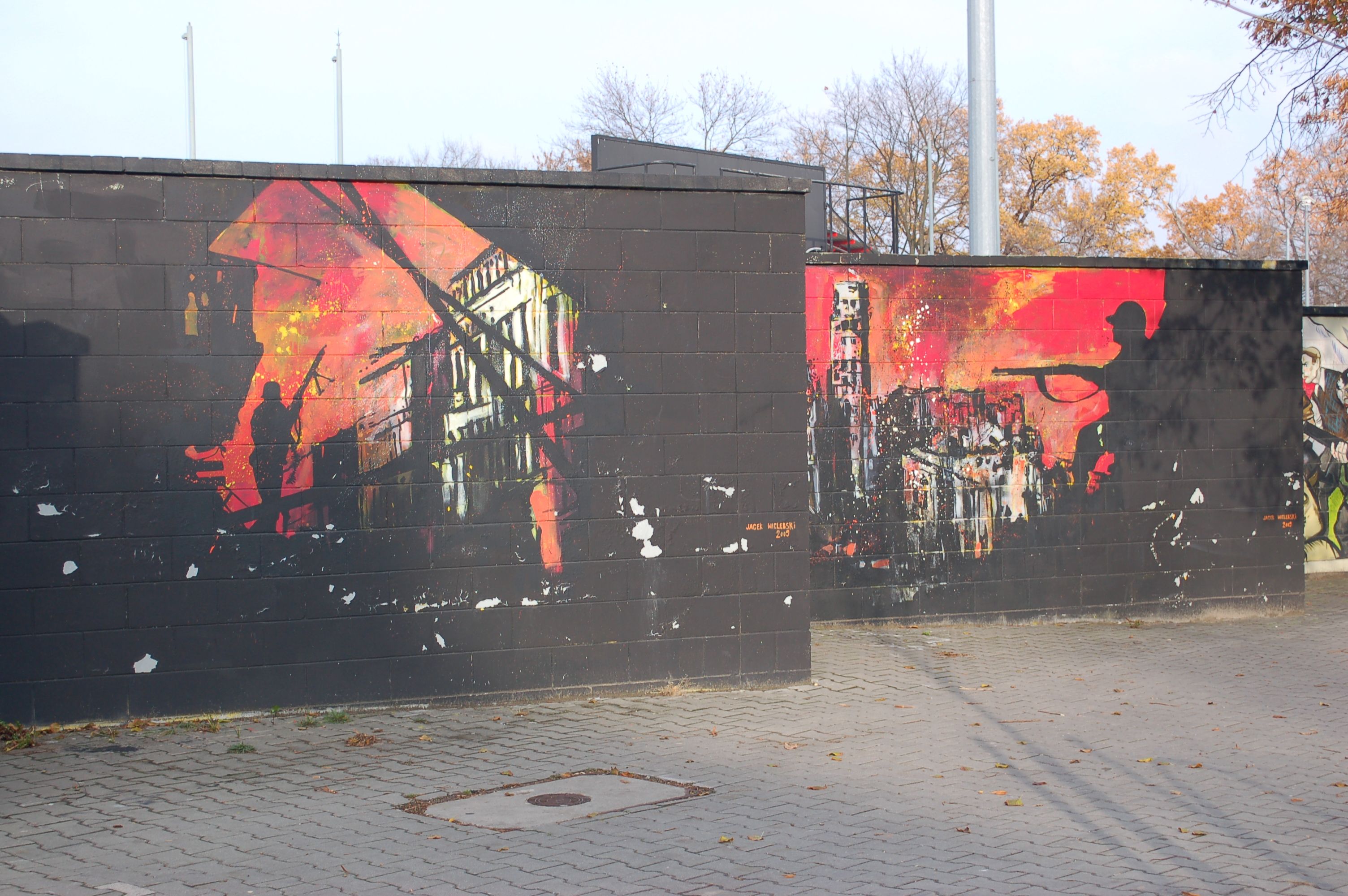
Murals at the stadium showing the Warsaw Uprising
