= Stadion Miejski (Ząbki) =

Multi-use stadium in Ząbki, Poland

Coordinates: 52.3°N 21.1°E

Ząbki Municipal Stadium
- Stadion Miejski w Ząbkach
- Interactive map of Ząbki Municipal Stadium
- Full name: Dozbud Arena
- Former names: Dolcan Arena
- Address: ul. Słowackiego 21
- Location: Ząbki, Poland
- Owner: MOSiR Ząbki
- Capacity: 2100
- Type: Stadium
- Event: Association football
- Surface: grass
- Record attendance: 1300
- Field size: 104 x 68 m
- Current use: Association football

Construction
- Opened: 18 November 2012
- Renovated: June 2010-July 2012
- Expanded: August 2015-September 2015
- Cost: zl 17,000,000

Tenants
- Ząbkovia Ząbki (1927–); Legia Warsaw II (2016–2020)

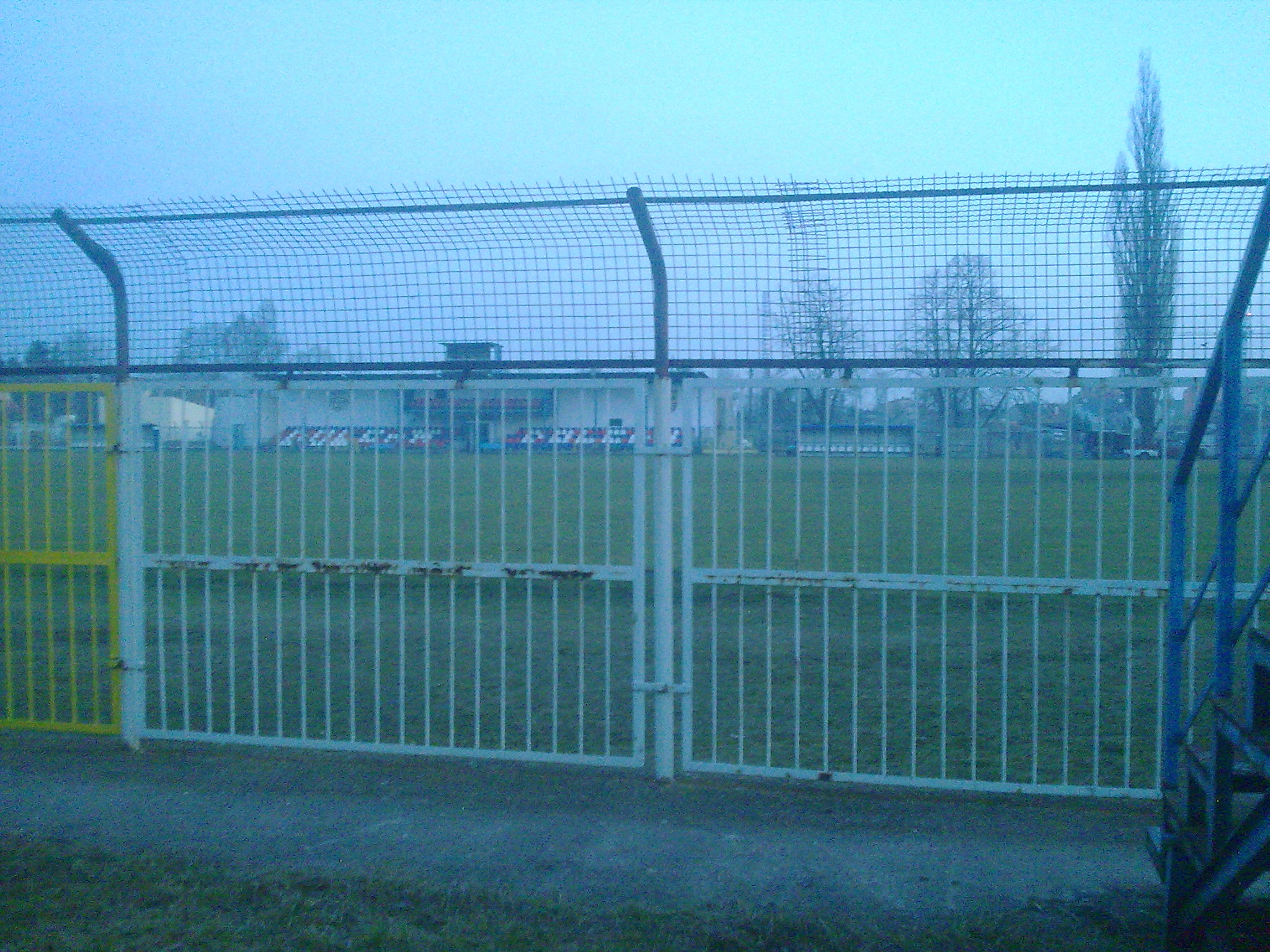
Covered stands at Dolcan arena

The Ząbki Municipal Stadium (Polish: Stadion Miejski w Ząbkach), officially known since 2018 as Dozbud Arena for sponsorship reasons and previously called Dolcan Arena, is a multi-use stadium in Ząbki, Poland.

It is primarily used for football matches and serves as the home ground of Ząbkovia Ząbki. The stadium has a capacity of 2,100 spectators and was extensively rebuilt in 2012, giving it its current appearance.

From 2016 to 2020, Legia Warsaw II played their home matches at the stadium. In 2020, the team relocated to Grodzisk Mazowiecki.
