= Silesia Rebels =

Logo

General information
- Founded: 2012
- Headquartered: Katowice, Poland
- Colours: Black and White
- Website: www.silesiarebels.com

Personnel
- Head coach: Michał Kołek

League / conference affiliations
- Polish Football League

Championships
- Polish Bowl: 0; 2009

The AZS Silesia Rebels are an American football team in Katowice, Silesia, Poland. The Rebels team arose from a merger between the Silesia Miners and the Ruda Śląska Warriors.

It is only PLFA team operates as an Academic Sports Association (AZS).

== History ==
=== Miners ===
Silesia Miners

General information
- Founded: 2006
- Folded: 2012
- Headquartered: Katowice, Poland
- Colours: Black and White

Personnel
- Head coach: Michał Kołek

League / conference affiliations
- Polish American Football League

Championships
- Polish Bowl: 0; 2009

The team was founded in April 2006, and joined to the 2007 PLFA season. Miners won four games and lost two (both to the Warsaw Eagles). Finished second in the division, team was awarded as a wild card to the postseason. In the semifinal road game, Miners beat the Eagles 16-13 and qualify to the Polish Bowl. The Miners lost championship game against The Crew Wrocław 0–18.

In the 2008 season, the Miners record was 3-4 and finished sixth in an eight-team PLFA I.

During the 2009 PLFA season, Miners lost two games in a regular season (against the Eagles 6-27 and The Crew 0-24). Miners quality to the playoff and won semifinal game against the Eagles 31–26. The Miners won the Polish Bowl IV with The Crew Wrocław 18–7. After earning the team has been honored with the title "Team of the month" in November 2009 by the International Federation of American Football.

As a defending champion, Miners lost their opening game against the Kraków Tigers 20–24. Miners won only one game, against the local rival, Zagłębie Steelers 42-6 and finished seventh in the eighth-team league.

In the 2011 season, Miners won two game in the season ending (against Lowlanders Białystok and the Steelers). Miners finished eighth in the ten-team league.

=== Warriors ===
Warriors Ruda Śląska

General information
- Founded: 2008
- Folded: 2012
- Headquartered: Ruda Śląska, Poland
- Colours: White, Silver and Black

League / conference affiliations
- Polish American Football League

The Warriors Ruda Śląska was created in April 2008, and joined to the 2009 PLFA season. Warriors won one game only, against Scyzory Kielce 45–18. Warriors played home games in three different cities (Będzin, Zabrze and Ruda Śląska).

During 2010 season, Warriors lost all six games. And home games played in Ruda Śląska.

Warrior's last season, 2011, was the best in club short history. Team won 4 games (including walkover from Radom Rocks) All three winnings was after defeated new teams (Częstochowa Saints twice and Tychy Falcons once). Warriors was awarded to the postseason and lost this game against Mustangs Płock in the wild card weekend. Home games was played in Zabrze.

=== Rebels ===
On January 31, 2012, the Miners and the Warriors announced about theirs merger and will play in the newly established Ekstraklasa PLFA.

== Season-by-season records ==
| PLFA champions (2006–2007); PLFA I champions (2008–present) | PLFA II champions (2008–present) | Championship Game appearances |

=== Silesia Miners (2007-11) ===
| Season | League | Division | Finish | Wins | Losses | Ties | Postseason results | Ref |
|---|---|---|---|---|---|---|---|---|
| 2007 | PLFA | Central | 2nd | 4 | 2 | 0 | Won Semi-Final (Eagles) 16–13; Lost Polish Bowl (The Crew) 0–18 | |
| 2008 | PLFA I | — | 6th | 3 | 4 | 0 | — | |
| 2009 | PLFA I | — | 2nd | 5 | 2 | 0 | Won Semi-Final (Eagles) 31–26; Won Polish Bowl (The Crew) 18–7 | |
| 2010 | PLFA I | — | 7th | 1 | 6 | 0 | — | |
| 2011 | PLFA I | — | 8th | 2 | 7 | 0 | — | |

=== Warriors Ruda Śląska (2009-11) ===
| Season | League | Division | Finish | Wins | Losses | Ties | Postseason results | Ref |
|---|---|---|---|---|---|---|---|---|
| 2009 | PLFA II | South | 6th | 1 | 5 | 0 | — | |
| 2010 | PLFA II | West | 6th | 0 | 6 | 0 | — | |
| 2011 | PLFA II | South | 3rd | 4 | 2 | 0 | Lost wild card (Mustangs) 8–18 | |

=== Silesia Rebels (2012-) ===
| Season | League | Division | Finish | Wins | Losses | Ties | Postseason results | Ref |
|---|---|---|---|---|---|---|---|---|
| 2012 | Ekstraklasa | — | — | — | — | — | — | |

== Honours ==
- Polish Bowl
  - Champions: 2009
  - Runners-up: 2007

== See also ==
- Sport in Katowice
