= Panthers Wrocław =

Professional American football team in Poland

- Current season
Logo

General information
- Founded: 2005, reorganized 2013
- Stadium: Stadion Olimpijski
- Headquartered: Wrocław, Poland
- Colours: Blue, black, white
- Website: pantherswroclaw.com

Personnel
- Head coach: Dave Likins

League / conference affiliations
- Polish American Football League (PLFA) (2014–2017) Central European Football League (2017–2020): Western Conference (2017–2018); Eastern Conference (2019); American Football League (LFA) (2018–2020) European League of Football (2021–2025): Northern Conference (2021–2022); Eastern Conference (2023–2025); American Football League Europe (2026-present): South/East Conference (2026-present)

Championships
- Polish Bowl: 4; 2016, 2017, 2019, 2020
- IFAF Europe Champions League: 1; 2016

The Panthers Wrocław is an American football team based in Wrocław, Poland, that competes in the American Football League Europe. The team is a result of a merger of Giants Wrocław and Devils Wrocław.

Previously, they played in domestic leagues PLFA until 2017 and in the LFA (2018–2020); and in international leagues IFAF Europe Champions League (2016) and CEFL (2017–2019). They won the Polish Bowl four times and the IFAF Europe Champions League in 2016.

== History ==
The team was founded in 2013 by a merger of two PLFA teams, Giants Wrocław and Devils Wrocław. In 2014, the club played in the Polish Bowl for the first time, where they lost to Seahawks Gdynia. In 2016, the Panthers dominated every game and won their first Championship. The Panthers won the title by defeating Seahawks, 56–13. After the Panthers won also the 2017 Polish Bowl, the team left the Polish American Football League and joined the new Liga Futbolu Amerykańskiego. In first two seasons in LFA, Panthers won every game in regular season, lost Polish Bowl XIII to Lowlanders Białystok 14–13 in 2018 and won Polish Bowl XIV to Lowlanders 28–14 (both final games were played at Wrocław Olympic Stadium).

The Panthers also became the first Polish team to win the IFAF Europe Champions League.

During the COVID-19 lockdown, Jakub Samel was named new head coach of the Panthers Wrocław. He is the first Polish head coach in club history. It was also announced that the club would be one of the first 8 to join the new European League of Football that is set to start in June 2021.

=== American Football League Europe (2026–present) ===
Panthers Wrocław were one of eight founding members of the European Football Alliance, which was created due to growing dissatisfaction with the league's management. After the conclusion of the 2025 ELF season, the EFA, now numbering 11 of the league's 16 teams, announced intentions to leave the ELF and form a new league for 2026. However, a split among the EFA franchises led to a separate league known as the American Football League Europe, with the Panthers among those defecting from the EFA to join the AFLE.

Panthers Wrocław finished the league's inaugural season with a 10-2 record, reaching the first-ever AFLE Gold Bowl, where they fell to the Vienna Vikings 68-5. Panthers' quarterback Jameson Wang was named the 2026 AFLE Most Valuable Player.

== Uniforms ==
The Panthers Wrocław's Panther blue home jersey has black numbers, letter outlines and vertical stripes on opposite sides. The away kit consists of a white jersey with dark blue letters and numbers that have orange outlines. Players wear white socks, black helmets with a panther head logo, and black pants to all games.

== Season-by-season records ==
=== Domestic ===
Season	League	Finish	Wins	Losses	Postseason	Result	Ref
2014	TopLiga	1st	8	2	1–1	Lost Polish Bowl (Seahawks) 41–32	
2015	TopLiga	1st	10	0	1–1	Lost Polish Bowl (Seahawks) 28–21	
2016	TopLiga	1st	7	1	2–0	Won Polish Bowl (Seahawks) 56–13	
2017	TopLiga	1st	6	0	2–0	Won Polish Bowl (Seahawks) 55–21	
2018	LFA1	1st	8	0	1–1	Lost Polish Bowl (Lowlanders) 14–13	
2019	LFA1	1st	8	0	2–0	Won Polish Bowl (Lowlanders) 28–14	
2020	LFA1	1st	8	0	2–0	Won Polish Bowl (Lowlanders) 48–12	

=== International ===
Season	League	Finish	Wins	Losses	Postseason	Result	Ref
2017	CEFL	2nd (Western)	1	1	Did not qualify		
2018	CEFL	2nd (Western)	1	1	Did not qualify		
2019	CEFL	2nd (Eastern)	2	1	Did not qualify		
2020	CEFL	Not held					
2021	ELF	2nd (North)	6	4	0–1	Lost Division Finals (Sea Devils) 30–27	
2022	ELF	3rd (North)	5	7	Did not qualify		
2023	ELF	3rd (Eastern)	8	4	0–1	Lost Wild Card (Surge) 14–37	
2024	ELF	2nd (Eastern)	6	6	Did not qualify		
2025	ELF	3rd (East)	5	7	Did not qualify		
2026	AFLE	2nd (South/East)	10	2	1–1	Lost Gold Bowl (Vikings) 5–68	

== Honours ==
- Polish Bowl (PLFA)
  - Champions: 2016, 2017
  - Runners-up: 2014, 2015
- Polish Bowl (LFA)
  - Champions: 2019, 2020
  - Runners-up: 2018
- IFAF Europe Champions League
  - Champions: 2016
- Gold Bowl (AFLE)
  - Runners-up: 2026

=== Players ===
Honor	Player Name	Season
AFLE Most Valuable Player	(United States) Jameson Wang	2026

=== The Crew Wrocław/Giants Wrocław ===
- Polish Bowl (PLFA)
  - Champions: 2007, 2011, 2013
  - Runners-up: 2009, 2010

=== Devils Wrocław ===
- Polish Bowl (PLFA)
  - Champions: 2010
  - Runners-up: 2011
