= Devils Wrocław =

General information
- Founded: 2005
- Folded: 2013
- Headquartered: Wrocław, Poland
- Colours: Red and Gold
- Website: devilswroclaw.pl

Personnel
- Head coach: Kenneth "Skip" Poole

League / conference affiliations
- Polish American Football League

Championships
- Polish Bowl: 1; 2010

The Devils Wrocław were an American football team based in Wrocław, Poland. They played in the Polish American Football League. Devils' American affiliate is Chattanooga Steam from Tennessee. In 2013, they merged with Giants Wrocław forming a new team Panthers Wrocław.

== History ==
The team was founded in May 2005. In 2010, they won the final of the Polish American Football League against The Crew Wrocław. In 2009 the team makes his first appearance at the EFAF Challenge Cup.

== Season-by-season records ==
PLFA champions (2006–2007); PLFA I champions (2008–present)	PLFA II champions (2008–present)	Championship Game appearances

Season	League	Division	Finish	Wins	Losses	Ties	Postseason results	Ref
2007	PLFA	South	2nd	3	3	0	—	
2008	PLFA I	—	4th	4	3	0	Lost semi-final (Seahawks) 20–24	
2009	PLFA I	—	7th	3	4	0	Won barrage (Torpedy) 28–0	
2010	PLFA I	—	1st	7	0	0	Won semi-final (Eagles) 54–13; Won Polish Bowl (The Crew) 37–32	
2011	PLFA I	—	2nd	8	1	0	Won semi-final (Eagles) 31–13; Lost Polish Bowl (The Crew) 26–27	
2012	Ekstraklasa	—	—	—	—	—	—	

== Honours ==
- Polish Bowl
  - Champions: 2010
