= Kraków Tigers =

American football team based in Kraków, Poland

- Founded: 2006
- Based in: Kraków, Poland
- League: Polish American Football League
- Division: Topliga
- Colours: Black and Orange
- Website: krakowtigers.com

The Kraków Tigers are an American football team based in Kraków, Poland founded in 2006. They play in the first division of the Polish American Football League.

== Season-by-season records ==
PLFA champions (2006–2007); PLFA I champions (2008–present)	PLFA II champions (2008–present)	Championship Game appearances

Season	League	Division	Finish	Wins	Losses	Ties	Postseason results	Ref
2007	PLFA	Central	3rd	0	6	0	—	
2008	PLFA I	—	8th	0	7	0	—	
2009	PLFA II	South	1st	6	0	0	Won Semi-Final (Owls) 24–0; Lost the Final (Steelers) 20–27	
2010	PLFA I	—	6th	2	5	0	—	
2011	PLFA I	—	5th	5	4	0	—	

== See also ==
- Sports in Kraków
