= American Football League (Poland) =

- Sport: American football
- Founded: 2017 in Wrocław, Poland
- First season: 2018
- Folded: 2020
- Replaced by: Polish Football League
- CEO: Marcin Wyszkowski
- No. of teams: 6 (LFA 1)
- Country: Poland
- Most titles: Panthers Wrocław (2)
- Website: ligafa.pl

The American Football League (Polish: Liga Futbolu Amerykańskiego, PFA) was an American football league in Poland. Founded in 2017 after a split in the Polish American Football Association. It consisted of 22 teams competing in two conferences, the LFA1 and LFA2. The championship game of the league was the Polish Bowl. In 2021 a new league started with participating both old PLFA and LFA members as Polish Football League.

== History ==
After the 2017 PLFA season, there was a split in the Polish American Football Association. 20 teams among them 5 from the TopLiga left the Polish American Football League and founded a new league.

== Teams 2020 ==
=== LFA 1 ===
- Panthers Wrocław
- Lowlanders Białystok
- Tychy Falcons
- Warsaw Mets
- Silesia Rebels
- Bydgoszcz Archers

== Polish Bowl ==
| Game | Season | Date | City | Venue | Hour | Winning team | Score | Losing team | MVP | Attendance |
|---|---|---|---|---|---|---|---|---|---|---|
| Polish Bowl XIII | 2018 | July 21, 2018 | Wrocław | Stadion Olimpijski | 18:30 | Lowlanders Białystok | 14:13 | Panthers Wrocław | Daniel Tarnawski | 4,000 |
| Polish Bowl XIV | 2019 | June 29, 2019 | Wrocław | Stadion Olimpijski | 18.00 | Panthers Wrocław | 28:14 | Lowlanders Białystok | Przemysław Banat | 4,500 |
| Polish Bowl XV | 2020 | November 14, 2020 | Wrocław | Stadion Olimpijski | 16.00 | Panthers Wrocław | 48:12 | Lowlanders Białystok | Bartosz Dziedzic | ? |
