= EFAF Challenge Cup =

The EFAF Challenge Cup was an international competition for European American Football clubs. The EFAF Challenge Cup was the third highest level of club competition in the European Federation of American Football (EFAF), behind the European Football League (EFL) and the EFAF Cup.

== EFAF Challenge Cup ==
Organised by EFAF, this competition is comparable to football's UI Cup.

Participants are Champions and Vice-Champions of the "smaller" American Football nations from eastern and southern Europe.

The competition was replaced by the IFAF CEI Interleague in 2011.

== Competition format ==
In 2009, the group phase consisted of two groups with four teams each. The winners and the second placed of these groups qualify directly for the semi-final phase. From 2010, the competition will feature 12 teams, divided in 4 groups of 3. The group winners qualify for the semifinals.

== Teams 2010 ==
=== Group A ===
- (Turkey) METU Falcons
- (Turkey) Istanbul Cavaliers
- (Serbia) Kraljevo Royal Crowns

=== Group B ===
- (Hungary) Győr Sharks
- (Turkey) ITU Tigers
- (Serbia) Klek Knights

=== Group C ===
- (Romania) Bucharest Warriors
- (Serbia) Čačak Angel Warriors
- (Turkey) Boğaziçi Sultans

=== Group D ===
- (Italy) Bologna Doves
- (Croatia) Zagreb Raiders
- (Hungary) Budapest Cowboys

=== Final ===
| Year | Winner | Runner-up | Score |
|---|---|---|---|
| 2010 | (Serbia) Klek Knights | (Turkey) Istanbul Cavaliers | 36-14 |

== Teams 2009 ==
=== Group A ===
- Pomorze Seahawks
- Győr Sharks
- Vrbas Hunters
- Klek Knights

=== Group B ===
- Devils Wrocław
- Hogs Reggio Emilia
- Pancevo Panthers
- Kragujevac Wild Boars

=== Final ===
| Year | Winner | Runner-up | Score |
|---|---|---|---|
| 2009 | (Italy) Hogs Reggio Emilia | (Hungary) Győr Sharks | 35-7 |
