= Zagłębie Steelers =

- Founded: 2007
- Based in: Będzin, Poland
- League: Polish American Football League
- Division: PLFA I
- Colours: Black and Silver

The Zagłębie Steelers are an American football team in Będzin, Zagłębie Dąbrowskie, Poland. They play in the Polish American Football League.

== History ==
The team was founded in September 2007. In 2008 PLFA season team joined to new created PLFA II. In the next season the Steelers won the league and was promoted to the top league, PLFA I.

== Season-by-season records ==
| PLFA champions (2006–2007); PLFA I champions (2008–present) | PLFA II champions (2008–present) | Championship Game appearances |

| Season | League | Division | Finish | Wins | Losses | Ties | Postseason results | Ref |
|---|---|---|---|---|---|---|---|---|
| 2008 | PLFA II | South | 3rd | 2 | 4 | 0 | — | |
| 2009 | PLFA II | South | 2nd | 5 | 1 | 0 | Won wildcard (Spartans) 27–7; Won semifinal (Torpedy) 23–20; Won the Final (Tigers) 27–20 | |
| 2010 | PLFA I | — | 8th | 1 | 6 | 0 | Won barrage (Fireballs) 37–32 | |
| 2011 | PLFA I | — | 9th | 1 | 8 | 0 | Won barrage (Mustangs) 22–8 | |

== Honours ==
- PLFA II Champion: 2009

== See also ==
- Zagłębie Dąbrowskie,
