= 2011 PLFA season =

- League: PLFA
- Sport: American football

Seasons
- ← 2010 2012 →

The 2011 season of the Polish American Football League (PLFA I) was the 6th season played by the major american football league in Poland. It was the first time that the PLFA I consisted of ten teams. The regular season took place between April 2 and June 19, 2011. The Polish champion was determined in the play-off final; the VI SuperFinal PLFA (known as the Polish Bowl VI). The Crew Wrocław (last year runner-up) beat the defending champion Devils Wrocław 27–26. The championship game was broadcast live on Sportklub channel, as a first PLFA game ever.

== Regular season ==
=== Results table ===
Team	Week								
Team	1	2	3	4	5	6	7	8	9
The Crew Wrocław (CRE)	@TIG	OWL	MIN	@LOW	SEA	DEV	@STE	@EAG	KOZ
The Crew Wrocław (CRE)	54-8	35-0	60-0	74-0	62-7	41-34	56-0	35-14	29-6
Devils Wrocław (DEV)	LOW	@MIN	@SEA	STE	@OWL	@CRE	EAG	@KOZ	TIG
Devils Wrocław (DEV)	60-0	31-6	22-18	84-0	42-0	34-41	36-13	47-0	44-0
Warsaw Eagles (EAG)	KOZ	@TIG	LOW	@SEA	@STE	MIN	@DEV	CRE	OWL
Warsaw Eagles (EAG)	42-7	55-28	53-0	30-13	62-6	69-0	13-36	14-35	68-6
Seahawks Gdynia (SEA)	MIN	@KOZ	DEV	EAG	@CRE	@OWL	TIG	@STE	LOW
Seahawks Gdynia (SEA)	34-23	28-26	18-22	13-30	7-62	26-6	39-20	41-0	68-0
Kraków Tigers (TIG)	CRE	EAG	@STE	KOZ	@MIN	LOW	@SEA	OWL	@DEV
Kraków Tigers (TIG)	8-54	28-55	30-14	20-18	36-32	32-16	20-39	36-0	0-44
Kozły Poznań (KOZ)	@EAG	SEA	@OWL	@TIG	@LOW	STE	MIN	DEV	@CRE
Kozły Poznań (KOZ)	7-42	26-28	13-12	18-20	12-18	36-0	27-0	0-47	6-29
Bielawa Owls (OWL)	STE	@CRE	KOZ	MIN	DEV	SEA	@LOW	@TIG	@EAG
Bielawa Owls (OWL)	21-0	0-35	12-13	21-20	0-42	6-26	39-8	0-36	6-68
AZS Silesia Miners (MIN)	@SEA	DEV	@CRE	@OWL	TIG	@EAG	@KOZ	LOW	STE
AZS Silesia Miners (MIN)	23-34	6-31	0-60	20-21	32-36	0-69	0-27	54-6	27-0
Zagłębie Steelers (STE)	@OWL	@LOW	TIG	@DEV	EAG	@KOZ	CRE	SEA	@MIN
Zagłębie Steelers (STE)	0-21	7-0	14-30	0-84	6-62	0-36	0-56	0-41	0-27
Lowlanders Białystok (LOW)	@DEV	STE	@EAG	CRE	KOZ	@TIG	OWL	@MIN	@SEA
Lowlanders Białystok (LOW)	0-60	0-7	0-53	0-74	18-12	16-32	8-39	6-54	0-68

=== Standings ===
Team	W	L	PTS	PCT	PF	PA	PD
The Crew Wrocław	9	0	18	1.000	446	69	+377
Devils Wrocław	8	1	16	0.889	400	78	+322
Warsaw Eagles	7	2	14	0.778	406	131	+275
Seahawks Gdynia	6	3	12	0.667	274	189	+85
Kraków Tigers	5	4	10	0.556	210	272	-62
Kozły Poznań	3	6	6	0.333	145	196	-51
Bielawa Owls	3	6	6	0.333	105	248	-143
AZS Silesia Miners	2	7	4	0.222	162	284	-122
Zagłębie Steelers Interpromex	1	8	2	0.111	27	357	-330
Lowlanders Białystok	1	8	2	0.111	48	399	-351

Source: pzfa.pl

== Postseason ==
=== Bracket ===
Semi-finals
1	The Crew Wrocław	27
4	Seahawks Gdynia	7
2	Devils Wrocław	31
3	Warsaw Eagles	13

VI SuperFinał PLFA
1	The Crew Wrocław	27
2	Devils Wrocław	26

== See also ==
- 2011 in sports
