= 2010 PLFA season =

- League: PLFA
- Sport: American football

Seasons
- ← 2009 2011 →

The 2010 season of the Polish American Football League (PLFA I) was the 5th season played by the major american football league in Poland. Regular season play was held from March 27 to July 4, 2010. The Polish champion title was eventually won by the Devils Wrocław when they defeated The Crew Wrocław; the Polish Bowl championship game, at the Niskie Ląki stadium in Wrocław, Lower Silesian Voivodeship on July 24.

== Regular season ==
Team	W	L	PTS	PCT	PF	PA
Devils Wrocław	7	0	14	1.000	324	70
The Crew Wrocław	6	1	12	0.857	252	47
Pomorze Seahawks	4	3	8	0.571	108	122
Warsaw Eagles	4	3	8	0.571	105	145
Kozły Poznań	3	4	6	0.429	100	148
Sioux Kraków Tigers	2	5	4	0.286	91	255
AZS Silesia Miners	1	6	2	0.143	89	137
Zagłębie Steelers Interpromex	1	6	2	0.143	72	247
Zachodniopomorska Husaria	—	—	—	—	—	—

== Playoffs ==
Top four teams was qualify to the play-offs.

=== Bracket ===
Semi-finals
1	Devils Wrocław	54
4	Warsaw Eagles	13
2	The Crew Wrocław	49
3	Pomorze Seahawks	0

V PLFA Final
1	Devils Wrocław	26
2	The Crew Wrocław	21

=== Semi-finals ===
- July 10, Wrocław

The Crew vs. Seahawks 49:0

- July 11, Wrocław

Devils vs. Eagles 54:13

=== Polish Bowl V ===
- July 24, 2010
- Wrocław
- Niskie Łąki stadium
- Attendance: 1,200
- MVP: Dawid Tarczyński (Devils)

Team	1	2	3	4	Total
Devils Wrocław	7	10	6	3	26
The Crew Wrocław	14	7	0	0	21

== See also ==
- 2010 in sports
