= Kozły Poznań =

General information
- Founded: 2005; 21 years ago
- Ended: 2018; 8 years ago
- Headquartered: Poznań, Poland
- Colors: Blue and White
- Website: KozlyPoznan.eu

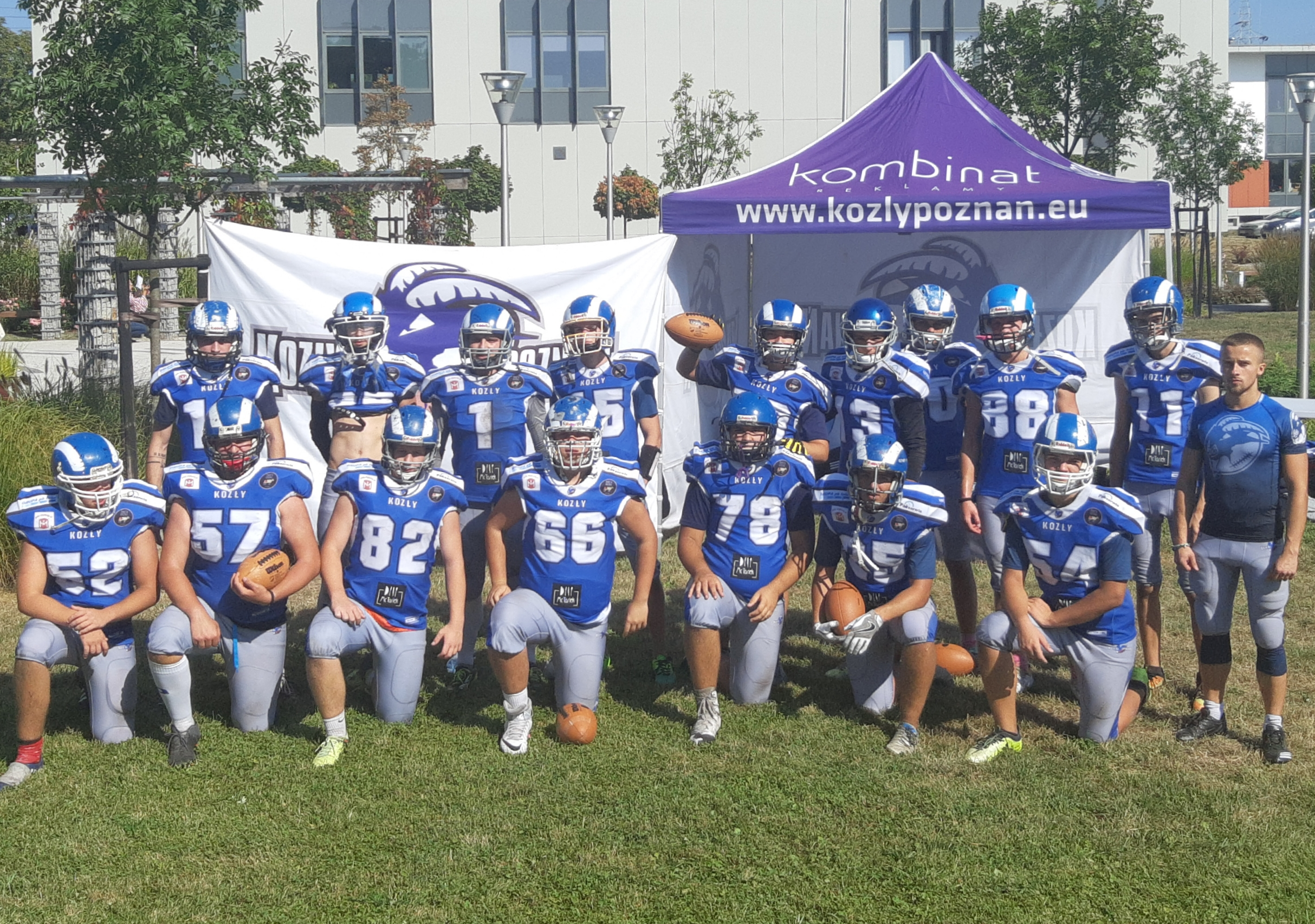
Kozły in 2018

The Kozły Poznań (English: Goats Poznań) were an American football team based in Poznań, Poland. In 2018, the team merged with another American football team from Poznań, Patrioci. The new team plays as Armia Poznań.

== History ==
The team was founded in June 2005 and joined to the Polish American Football League in the 2007 season. 2009 PLFA season was the best season in the Kozły' history: they finished fourth in the regular season and was qualified to the post-season game (lost to The Crew Wrocław in the semi-final). 2009 season was the only winning Kozły' season (4-3).

== Season-by-season records ==
PLFA champions (2006–2007); PLFA I champions (2008–present)	PLFA II champions (2008–present)	Championship Game appearances

Season	League	Division	Finish	Wins	Losses	Ties	Postseason results	Ref
2007	PLFA	North	3rd	1	5	0	—	
2008	PLFA I	—	7th	2	5	0	Won barrage (Torpedy) 22–0	
2009	PLFA I	—	4th	4	3	0	Lost semi-final (The Crew) 8–28	
2010	PLFA I	—	5th	3	4	0	—	
2011	PLFA I	—	6th	3	6	0	—	

== See also ==
- Sports in Poznań
