= Ząbki =

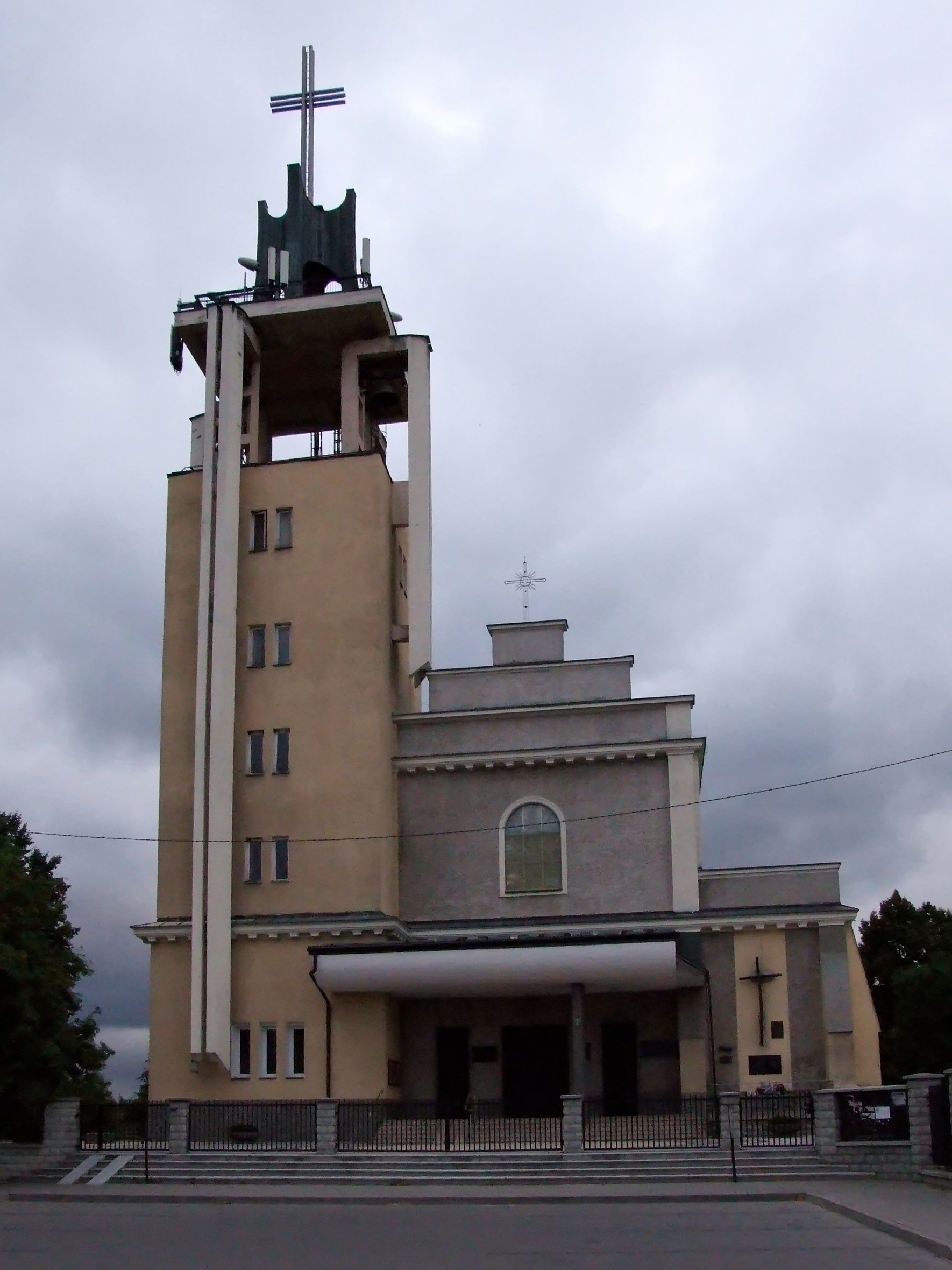
- Church of the Holy Trinity

- Coat of arms

- Location within Poland
- Coordinates: 52°17′34″N 21°6′58″E
- Country: Poland
- Voivodeship: Masovian
- County: Wołomin
- Gmina: Ząbki (urban gmina)
- Town rights: 1967

Government
  - Mayor: Małgorzata Zyśk

Area
  - Total: 11.13 km^{2} (4.30 sq mi)

Population (2013)
  - Total: 31,884
  - Density: 2,865/km^{2} (7,420/sq mi)
- Time zone: UTC+1 (CET)
  - Summer (DST): UTC+2 (CEST)
- Postal code: 05-091
- Area code: +48 022
- Car plates: WWL
- Website: http://www.zabki.pl

Ząbki [ˈzɔmpkʲi] is a town in central Poland with 31,884 inhabitants (2013). It is situated in the Masovian Voivodeship, just northeast of Warsaw.

== Location ==
Ząbki is located 8 kilometres (5 miles) away from Warsaw city center. It borders Warsaw to the south and west, the city of Marki to the north and Zielonka to the east.

== History ==
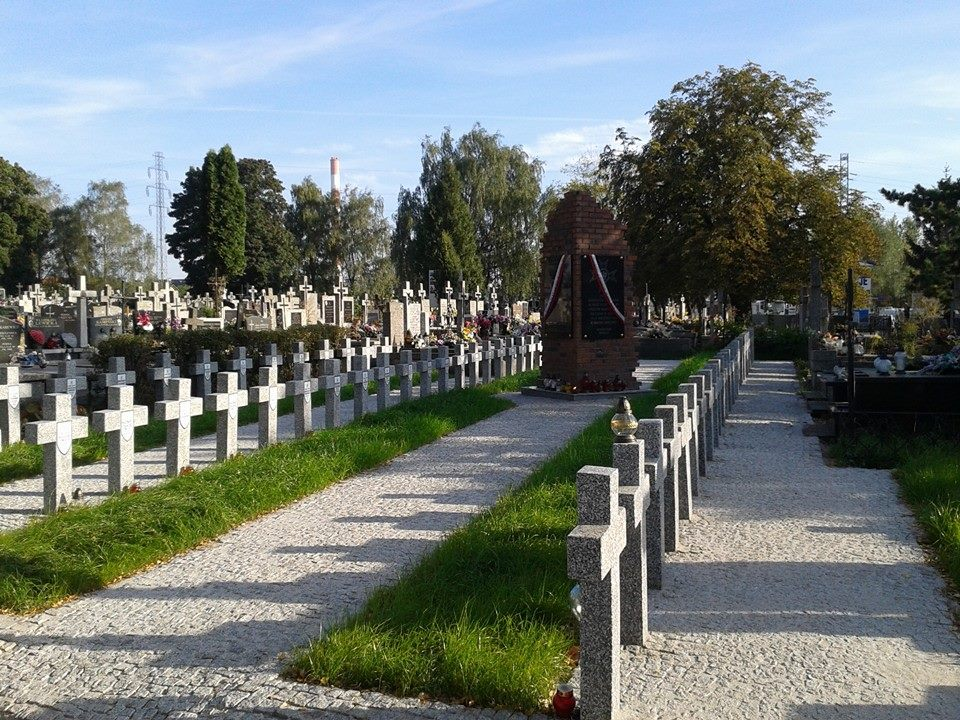
Cemetery of Polish soldiers killed during the German invasion in 1939

Initially called Wola Ząbkowa, the settlement dates back to the 16th century. It was a royal village, administratively located in the Warsaw County in the Masovian Voivodeship in the Greater Poland Province of the Kingdom of Poland. In 1880, Count Plater from the Polish noble family of Plater owned a brickyard in Ząbki. Ząbki was a place of concentration of some Polish units participating in the victorious Battle of Warsaw against the invading Russians in August 1920.

During the joint German-Soviet invasion of Poland, which started World War II in September 1939, Ząbki was invaded by Germany, and then occupied until 1944.

Ząbki obtained town status in 1967.

In Ząbki, Blessed Jerzy Popiełuszko first served as a young priest in 1972–1975. There is a monument of Fr. Popiełuszko in the town.

== Transport ==
A railway line connects the city to Warszawa Wileńska. Proximity to expressways makes for easy road access both to the north of Warsaw via Trasa AK, and south via Trasa Siekierkowska and Lazienkowska. Several bus routes connect Ząbki with Warsaw, as the Zarząd Transportu Miejskiego lines.

== Sports ==
The local football team is Ząbkovia Ząbki. It competes in the lower leagues.
