= 2009 PLFA season =

- League: PLFA
- Sport: American football

Seasons
- ← 2008 2010 →

The 2009 season of the Polish American Football League (PLFA I) was the 4th season played by the major american football league in Poland. Regular season play was held from April 5 to September 20, 2009. The Polish champion title was eventually won by the AZS Silesia Miners when they defeated The Crew Wrocław; the Polish Bowl championship game, at the Marymont stadium in Warsaw, Masovian Voivodeship on October 17.

== Regular season ==
Team	W	L	PTS	PCT	PF	PA
The Crew Wrocław	6	1	12	0.857	236	31
AZS Silesia Miners	5	2	10	0.714	177	91
Warsaw Eagles	4	3	8	0.571	160	90
Kozły Poznań	4	3	8	0.571	88	155
Pomorze Seahawks	3	4	6	0.429	88	106
Zachodniopomorska Husaria	3	4	6	0.429	114	142
Devils Wrocław	3	4	6	0.429	111	172
Lowlanders Białystok	0	7	0	0.000	36	223

== Playoffs ==
Top four teams was qualify to the play-offs.

=== Bracket ===
Semi-finals
1	The Crew Wrocław	28
4	Kozły Poznań	8
2	AZS Silesia Miners	31
3	Warsaw Eagles	26

IV PLFA Final
1	The Crew Wrocław	7
2	AZS Silesia Miners	18

=== Semi-finals ===
- October 3, Wrocław

The Crew vs. Kozły 28:8

- October 4, Katowice

Miners vs. Eagles 31:26

=== Polish Bowl IV ===
- October 17, 2009
- Warsaw
- Marymont stadium
- Attendance: 1,200
- MVP: Grzegorz Suder (Miners)

Team	1	2	3	4	Total
The Crew Wrocław	6	0	12	0	7
AZS Silesia Miners	0	7	0	0	18

== See also ==
- 2009 in sports
