= Giants Wrocław =

American football team in Poland

Logo

General information
- Founded: 2005
- Folded: 2013
- Headquartered: Wrocław, Poland
- Colours: Red and Black
- Website: giganci.com

Personnel
- Head coach: Jacek Wallusch

League / conference affiliations
- Polish American Football League

Championships
- Polish Bowl: 2; 2007, 2011

The Giants Wrocław (formerly The Crew Wrocław) were an American football team based in Wrocław, Poland. They played in the Polish American Football League.

== History ==
The team was founded in 2005 as Wrocław Angels. In 2007, they won the final of the Polish American Football League against Silesia Miners. In 2008 the team made its first appearance at the EFAF Cup. In 2009 Aki Jones joined The Crew. Jones is the first former NFL player who is playing in the Polish league. In 2012, the team changed its name from The Crew Wrocław to Giants Wrocław. In 2013, they merged with Devils Wrocław forming a new team Panthers Wrocław.

== Season-by-season records ==
=== PLFA ===
PLFA champions (2006–2007); PLFA I champions (2008–present)	PLFA II champions (2008–present)	Championship Game appearances

Season	League	Division	Finish	Wins	Losses	Ties	Postseason results	Ref
2006	PLFA	—	3rd	1	2	0	Lost 3rd placed game (Fireballs) W.O.	
2007	PLFA	South	1st	5	1	0	Won semi-final (Seahawks) 2–18; Won Polish Bowl (Miners) 18–0	
2008	PLFA I	—	3rd	4	3	0	Lost semi-final (Eagles) 7–8	
2009	PLFA I	—	1st	6	1	0	Won semi-final (Kozły) 28–8; Lost Polish Bowl (Miners) 7–18	
2010	PLFA I	—	2nd	6	1	0	Won semi-final (Seahawks) 49–0; Lost Polish Bowl (Devils) 32–37	
2011	PLFA I	—	1st	9	0	0	Won semi-final (Seahawks) 27–7; Won Polish Bowl (Devils) 27–26	

=== EFAF ===
Season	Competition	Group	Finish	Wins	Losses	Ties	Season results	Playoffs results	Ref
2008	EFAF Cup	D	3rd	0	2	0	vs Prague Panthers 0-53 at Danube Dragons 0-84	—	
2012	EFAF Cup	C	—	—	—	—	at Søllerød Gold Diggers vs Prague Black Hawks	—	

=== ČLAF ===
Season	Competition	Group	Finish	Wins	Losses	Ties	Playoffs results	Ref
2006	ČLAF	?	?	?	?	?	?	
2012	ČLAF	A1	—	—	—	—	—	

== Honours ==
- Polish Bowl
  - Champions: 2007, 2011, 2013
  - Runners-up: 2009, 2010
