= 2008 PLFA season =

- League: PLFA
- Sport: American football

Seasons
- ← 2007 2009 →

The 2008 season of the Polish American Football League (PLFA I) was the 3rd season played by the major american football league in Poland. Regular season play was held from March 29 to September 28, 2008. The Polish champion title was eventually won by the Warsaw Eagles when they defeated the Pomorze Seahawks; the Polish Bowl championship game, at the Olympic Stadium in Wrocław, Lower Silesian Voivodeship on October 18.

== Regular season ==
Team	W	L	PTS	PCT	PF	PA
Pomorze Seahawks	6	1	12	0.857	206	90
Warsaw Eagles	5	2	10	0.714	146	70
The Crew Wrocław	4	3	8	0.571	180	71
Devils Wrocław	4	3	8	0.571	121	91
Zachodniopomorska Husaria	4	3	8	0.571	116	132
AZS Silesia Miners	3	4	6	0.429	138	116
Kozły Poznań	2	5	4	0.286	54	159
Sioux Kraków Tigers	0	7	0	0.000	29	261

== Playoffs ==
Top four teams was qualify to the play-offs.

=== Bracket ===
Semi-finals
1	Pomorze Seahawks	24
4	Devils Wrocław	20
2	Warsaw Eagles	8
3	The Crew Wrocław	7

III PLFA Final
1	Pomorze Seahawks	14
2	Warsaw Eagles	26

=== Semi-finals ===
- October 4, Warsaw

Eagles vs. The Crew 8:7

- October 5, Gdańsk

Seahawks vs. Devils 24:20

=== Polish Bowl III ===
- October 18, 2008
- Wrocław
- Olympic Stadium
- Attendance: 800
- MVP: Wojciech Krzemień (Eagles)

Team	1	2	3	4	Total
Pomorze Seahawks	0	7	0	7	14
Warsaw Eagles	0	6	0	20	26

== See also ==
- 2008 in sports
