= Warsaw Eagles =

American football team in Warsaw, Poland

Logo

General information
- Founded: 1999
- Stadium: Bemowski Ośrodek Piłki Nożnej - Obrońców Tobruku 11
- Headquartered: Warsaw, Poland
- Colours: Navy, orange
- Mascot: Pierzak
- Website: https://warsaweagles.com/

Personnel
- Owner: Paul Kusmierz
- Head coach: Deante Battle

League / conference affiliations
- American Football League Europe; Polish Football League; PFL1

Championships
- Polish Bowl: 7; 2006, 2008, 2018, 2019, 2024, 2025, 2026

The Warsaw Eagles are an American football team in Warsaw, Poland. They play in the Polish Football League and are an upcoming expansion team to the American Football League Europe. Paul Kusmierz is the owner of the team.

== History ==
The team was founded in 1999 by a group of NFL enthusiasts consisting of Jędrzej Staszewski, Piotr Gorzkowski, Jan Kowalski, Grzegorz Mikuła, and Tomasz Kozankiewicz, who are considered to be the founders of the Warsaw Eagles club.

In 2004 the club purchased professional sports gear for the first time to be able to spar with the very first opponent on the Polish arena - Fireballs Wielkopolska. The first game was played on December 17 of 2004 in Suchy Las near Poznań. In 2006 along with 1. KFA Wielkopolska, Pomorze Seahawks (currently Seahawks Gdynia) and The Crew Wrocław (currently Giants Wrocław), the Eagles debuted in the very first edition of the Polish American Football League and having dominated each game, won the first Championship title. The Eagles would go on to win the title again in 2008 defeating The Crew Wrocław 26:14. In 2009, the team signed contracts with its first two import professional players from the United States. In the 2012–13 season, the Eagles signed four American import players.

On 5 September 2026, the American Football League Europe announced the Warsaw Eagles as the league's ninth overall franchise, and the second from Poland after the Panthers Wrocław. The team will begin AFLE play for the 2027 season.

== Uniforms ==
The Warsaw Eagles’ navy-blue home jersey has orange numbers, letter outlines and vertical stripes on opposite sides. The away kit consists of a white jersey with dark blue letters and numbers that have orange outlines. Players wear white socks, navy blue helmets with an Eagle head, and navy-blue pants to all games.

== Season-by-season records ==
PLFA champions (2006–2007); PLFA I champions (2008–present)	PLFA II champions (2008–present)	Championship Game appearances

Season	League	Division	Finish	Wins	Losses	Ties	Postseason results	Ref
2006	PLFA	—	1st	3	0	0	Won Polish Bowl (Seahawks) 34–6	
2007	PLFA	Central	1st	6	0	0	Lost semi-final (Miners) 13–16	
2008	PLFA I	—	2nd	5	2	0	Won Polish Bowl (Seahawks) 26–14	
2009	PLFA I	—	3rd	4	3	0	Lost semi-final (Miners) 26–31	
2010	PLFA I	—	4th	4	3	0	Lost semi-final (Devils) 13–54	
2011	PLFA I	—	3rd	7	2	0	Lost semi-final (Devils) 13–31	

== Fan traditions ==
Bernie Dance

Fans of the Warsaw Eagles club have adopted the Bernie Dance (a dance style from the 1993 comedy film Weekend at Bernies II which involves loosely wobbling arms and tilting one’s head back) to celebrate each touchdown scored by their players during the game.

Eagles’ Nest (Orle Gniazdo)
An official fan-club organization called “Eagles’ Nest” composed of the team’s most devoted fans.

== Stadiums ==
Warsaw Eagles game site locations and stadiums:

- pre-2010: Piaseczno, Żyrardów, Marymont
- 2010-2012: Bemowo
- 2013-2022 : Polonia Stadium
- 2023- : Bemowo

== Honours ==
- Polish Bowl
  - Champions: 2006, 2008, 2018, 2019, 2024, 2025, 2026

== Media ==
Video of Clarence Anderson’s (WR) 75-yard punt return from Eagles’ home game against Warsaw Spartans during the 2012–13 season has been prominently featured across all major Polish and American sports media programs including ESPN and ESPN2.

== Current staff ==
Front office

- Owner – Paul Kusmierz
- General Manager - Osman Hózman-Mirza-Sulkiewicz
- President of the Board - Marek Włodarczyk

Head coaches

- Head coach - Deante Battle
- Offensive coordinator - Paweł Kaźmierczak
- Defensive coordinator - Darius Lewis

== See also ==
- Sports in Warsaw
