= Seahawks Gdynia =

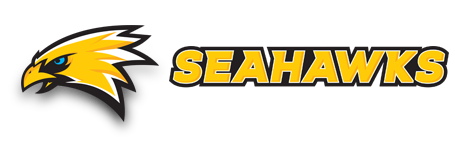
Logo

General information
- Founded: 2005
- Folded: 2020
- Stadium: National Rugby Stadium
- Headquartered: Gdynia, Poland
- Colours: Black and Yellow
- Website: seahawks.pl

Personnel
- Head coach: Mele J. Mosqueda
- President: Maciej Cetnerowski

League / conference affiliations
- Liga Futbolu Amerykańskiego; LFA 1

Championships
- Polish Bowl: 0; 2012, 2014, 2015

The Seahawks Gdynia were an American football team based in Gdynia, Poland. They played in the Liga Futbolu Amerykańskiego.

== History ==
The team was founded in October 2005 as the Pomorze Seahawks. In 2006, the Seahawks were one of four founders of the Polish American Football League and, in the first season, made their first appearance in the national championship game, the Polish Bowl, but lost to the Warsaw Eagles. In 2008, they lost the Polish Bowl to the Eagles again. In 2009, the team made its first appearance in the EFAF Challenge Cup.

In the first two seasons, the Seahawks played home games in Sopot, and in the next three, they played in Gdańsk at the GOKF stadium. Since the 2011 PLFA season, the Seahawks moved to Gdynia, changed their name to Seahawks Gdynia and played at the National Rugby Stadium.

After the 2017 season, the Seahawks left the Polish American Football League and joined the new Liga Futbolu Amerykańskiego. The Seahawks would end up folding in 2020 due to economic issues and tensions between the players and the administration, with many outright abandoning the team.

== Season-by-season records ==
PLFA champions (2006–2007); PLFA I champions (2008–present)	PLFA II champions (2008–present)	Championship Game appearances

Season	League	Division	Finish	Wins	Losses	Ties	Postseason results	Ref
2006	PLFA	—	2nd	2	1	0	Lost Polish Bowl (Eagles) 6–34	
2007	PLFA	North	1st	5	1	0	Lost semi-final (The Crew) 2–18	
2008	PLFA I	—	1st	6	1	0	Lost Polish Bowl (Eagles) 14–26	
2009	PLFA I	—	5th	3	4	0	—	
2010	PLFA I	—	3rd	4	3	0	Lost semi-final (The Crew) 0–49	
2011	PLFA I	—	4th	6	3	0	Lost semi-final (The Crew) 7–27	

== Honours ==
- Polish Bowl
  - Champions: 2012, 2014, 2015
- CEFL
  - 2nd place: 2018

== See also ==
- American football
- Sports in Tricity (Gdańsk, Gdynia, Sopot)
