= Polish American Football League =

Sports league

- Most recent season or competition: 2019 PLFA season
- Sport: American football
- Founded: October 2004
- Founder: PZFA
- First season: 2004
- Folded: 2019
- Replaced by: Polish Football League
- CEO: Przemysław Kazaniecki
- No. of teams: 13
- Country: Poland
- Website: plfa.pl

The Polish American Football League or shortly PLFA (Polish: Polska Liga Futbolu Amerykańskiego) was a structured system for the American football competitions in Poland founded in 2004 by the Polish federation PZFA. In 2012, the Topliga was created as a major league with a bid (invitation) rule. The remaining teams are divided into two leagues (PLFA I and PLFA II) between which there was promotion and relegation. There were two eight-man football competitions: PLFA 8 for reserve teams and smaller clubs, and PLFA J for under-17 players.

The top four teams from the Topliga regular season entered the playoffs and the winners met in the championship game called the SuperFinał (more commonly known as the Polish Bowl). The PLFA I championship game was called the PLFA Cup Game.

In the 2013 season there were 74 teams in 5 leagues. 57 teams played 11-man football (8 teams in the Topliga, 8 teams in the PLFA I and 21 teams in the PLFA II) and other 37 teams played 8-man football competitions: 20 senior teams and 17 junior teams). The TopLiga and PLFA I are divided into two divisions, PLFA II into three divisions, and PLFA 8 and PLFAJ into five divisions based on geographical reasons.

After the 2017 season, there was a split in Polish American football, 20 clubs left the PLFA and founded a new league, the Liga Futbolu Amerykańskiego or shortly LFA.

== History ==
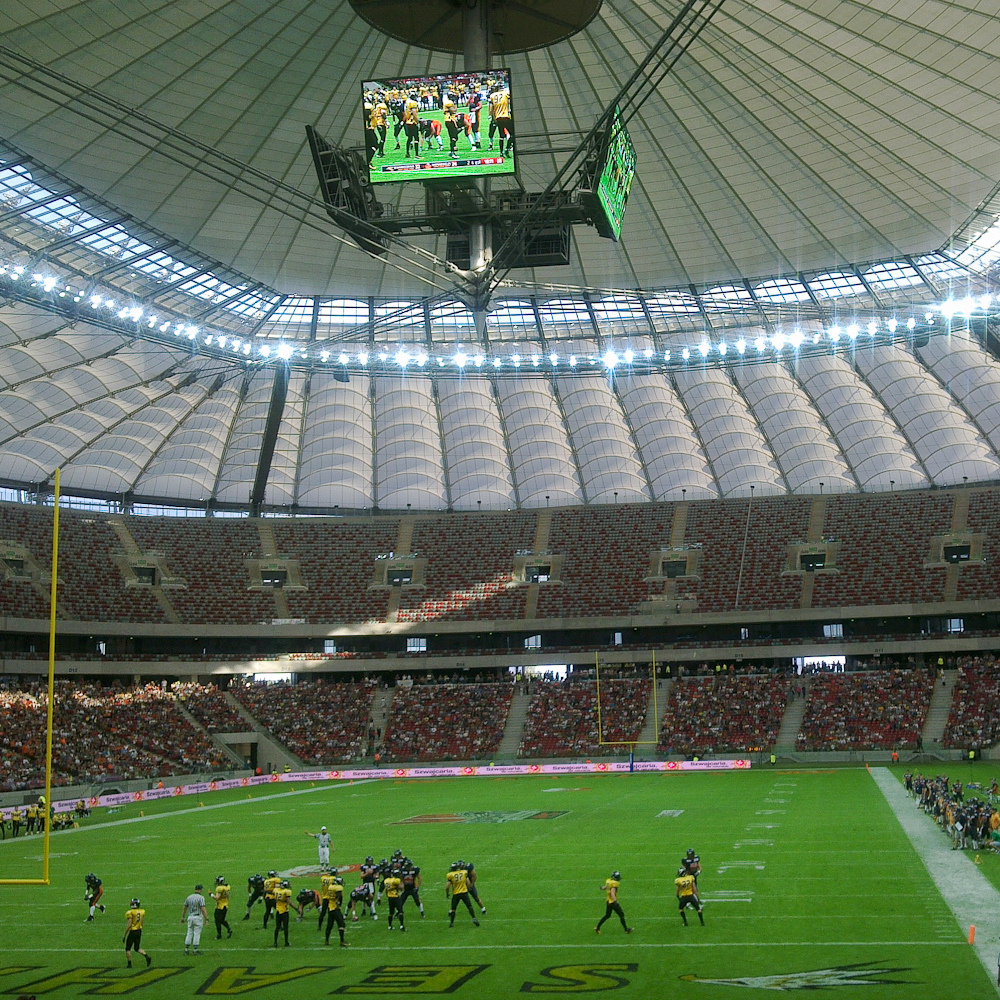
2012 SuperFinal in National Stadium in front of 23,000 viewers.

American football is arguably the fastest growing sport in Poland, which appeared in Poland in 1999, when a pioneer initiative was established in Warsaw. The Polish American Football Association (Polish: Polski Związek Futbolu Amerykańskiego or PZFA) was created in November 2004, initiated by the first two American football teams: Warsaw Eagles and 1. KFA Wielkopolska. Its founding was a response to the dynamic growth of the American football movement in Poland.

The first game between Polish teams (still without professional equipment) was played in December 2005 in Poznań. The first international game, officiated by professionals, was played in March 2006 – The Warsaw Eagles took on Czech team Pardubice Stallions in a game played in Warsaw. From that moment on, teams began to be established in different parts of the country.

The Polish American Football League started in October 2006 with just 4 teams. There were 9 teams competing for the second championship in 2007. In 2008, the league split into two divisions - PLFA I (8 teams) and PLFA II (9 teams). There were 22 teams competing for the 2009 season and 21 for the 2010 season. 2011- 34 teams, 2012- 42 teams, and 2013- 74 teams.

== Season structure ==
The regular season in the Topliga starts in March/April and ends in June/July. Each team plays nine games competing against every other team in the division (4 or 5 home games and 5 or 4 away games). A team is awarded two points for a win, one point for a tie, and zero points for a loss (a tie only occurs if the overtime can not be played).

After a regular season, the top four teams qualify for the play-offs (1st place against 4th place and 2nd against 3rd) and the Semi-Final winners meet in the championship game called SuperFinal; there is no 3rd place game.

The 2012 Super-Final championship game drew 23,000 fans.

== Game rules ==
Playing rules are based on those of the NCAA College football with minor modifications, e.g.:

- 12-minute quarters
- minimal field markings
- unsportsmanlike conduct for excessive celebration after plays, similar to the NFL rules
- no Instant replay

Rules are adopted with a one-year delay. For example, 2011 NCAA game rule changes was adopted for 2012 PLFA season.

Before 2012, coaches, players and officials used the English-language NCAA Rulebook. In February 2012, the Rulebook was translated into Polish by the Officiating Department chairman.

== Teams in 2019 Season ==
Top Liga
- Bydgoszcz Archers
- Kraków Tigers
- Warsaw Eagles
- Kaunas Dukes
- Vilnius Iron Wolves
- Ząbki Dukes

EESL
- Minsk Litvins
- Moscow Spartans
- St. Petersburg Griffins
- St. Petersburg North Legion

== Champions ==
Season	PLFA I	PLFA II	—	PLFA 8 (8v8)	—
2006	Warsaw Eagles	—	—	—	—
2007	The Crew Wrocław	—	—	—	—
2008	Warsaw Eagles	Lowlanders Białystok	—	—	—
2009	Silesia Miners	Zagłębie Steelers	—	—	—
2010	Devils Wrocław	Bielawa Owls	—	—	—
2011	The Crew Wrocław	Warsaw Spartans	—	Warsaw Eagles B	—
Season	Topliga	PLFA I	PLFA II	PLFA 8 (8v8)	PLFA J (under-17, 8v8)
2012	Seahawks Gdynia	Warsaw Spartans	Tychy Falcons	Seahawks Gdynia	Warsaw Eagles
2013	Giants Wrocław	Husaria Szczecin	Królewscy Warszawa	Zagłębie Steelers	Bielawa Owls
2014	Seahawks Gdynia	Husaria Szczecin	Silesia Rebels	Warsaw Eagles C	Panthers Wrocław
2015	Seahawks Gdynia	Kraków Kings	Outlaws Wrocław	OldBoys Warszawa	Panthers Wrocław
2016	Panthers Wrocław	Tychy Falcons	Panthers Wrocław B	OldBoys Warszawa	Bielawa Owls
2017	Panthers Wrocław	Warsaw Sharks			
2018	Warsaw Eagles				

== See also ==
- Sport in Poland
