= Polish Bowl =

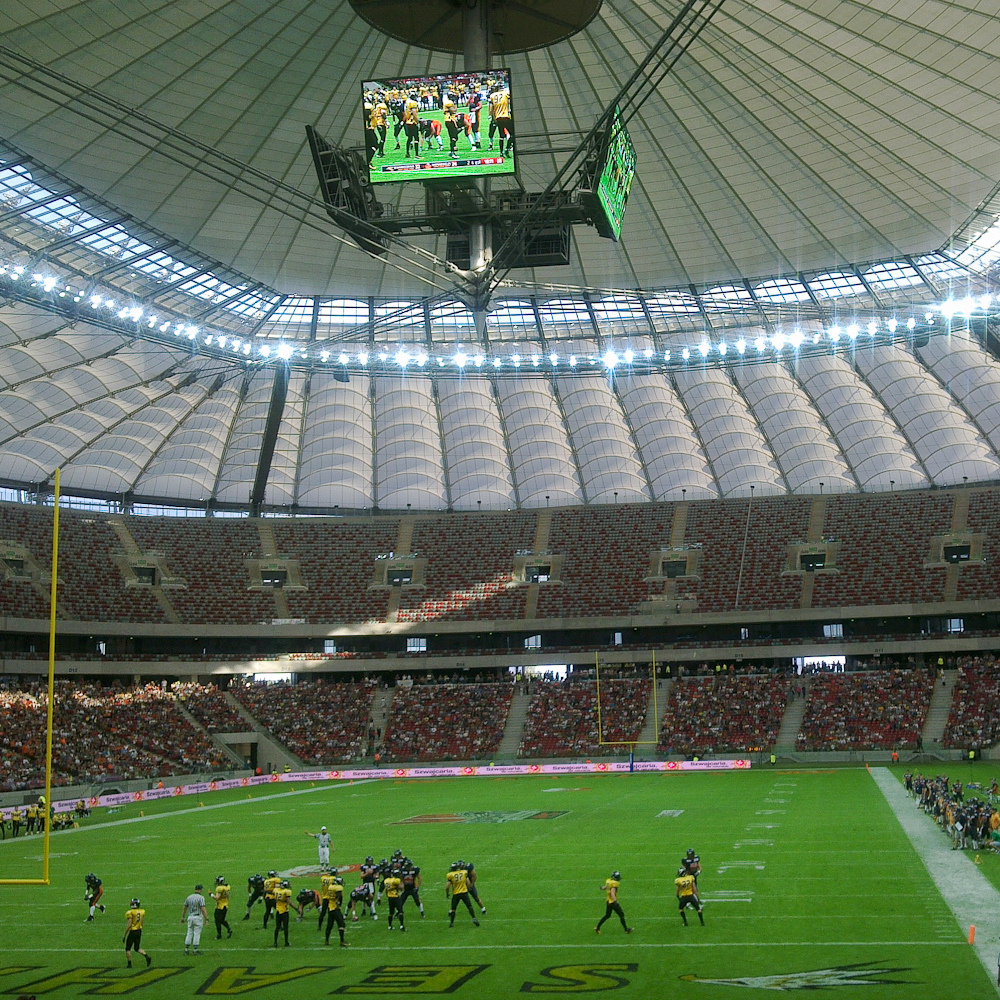
- 2012 game
- First meeting: Warsaw, November 12, 2006
- Latest meeting: Wrocław, July 26, 2026
- Next meeting: 2027
- Broadcasters: Sport Klub (2011), nSport (2012), TVP Sport (2013)

Statistics
- Total meetings: 23
- Most wins: Warsaw Eagles (7)

Sponsors
- NAC (2012), Trawnik Producent (2013)

The Polish Bowl (formerly known as the SuperFinał) is the championship game of the Polish Football League (PFL). The first Polish Bowl played on November 12, 2006 in Warsaw at the Marymont stadium between top two teams in regular season. Since 2007 in the Polish Bowl game is played between Semi-Final winners.

As the Super Bowl, the Polish Bowl uses Roman numerals to identify each game, rather than the year in which it is held. For example, Polish Bowl I was played in 2006, while Polish Bowl VII played on July 15, 2012, to determine the champion of the 2012 regular season.

Since 2011 (Polish Bowl VI), official name of the Polish Bowl is SuperFinał, formerly the PLFA Finał.

After 2017 some teams separated from PLFA into newly formed league Liga Futbolu Amerykańskiego, so in 2018 both competitions held finals, referred as Polish Bowl XIII. In 2019 the PLFA ended after the regular season and the planned post-season including Polish Bowl was not held. The PLFA dissolved after the season.

In 2020 the LFA final was postponed because of the Covid-19 pandemic, played in November behind closed doors. In 2021 7 former PLFA and LFA teams merged under the newly formed Polish football association ZFAP.

== Polish Bowl games ==
=== PLFA ===
Game	Date	Winning team	Score	Losing team	Venue	City	Attendance	Ref
I	November 12, 2006	Warsaw Eagles	34–6	Pomorze Seahawks	Marymont stadium	Warsaw	1,300	
II	October 14, 2007	The Crew Wrocław	18–0	AZS Silesia Miners	Marymont stadium	Warsaw	400	
III	October 18, 2008	Warsaw Eagles	26–14	Pomorze Seahawks	Stadion Olimpijski	Wrocław	1,100	
IV	October 17, 2009	AZS Silesia Miners	18–7	The Crew Wrocław	Marymont stadium	Warsaw	1,200	
V	July 24, 2010	Devils Wrocław	26–21	The Crew Wrocław	Niskie Łąki stadium	Wrocław	1,200	
VI	July 17, 2011	The Crew Wrocław	27–26	Devils Wrocław	Bielawianka stadium	Bielawa	1,500	
VII	July 15, 2012	Seahawks Gdynia	52–37	Warsaw Eagles	National Stadium	Warsaw	23,000	
VIII	July 14, 2013	Giants Wrocław	29–13	Warsaw Eagles	National Stadium	Warsaw	16,500	
IX	August 2, 2014	Seahawks Gdynia	41–32	Panthers Wrocław	Stadion Miejski	Gdynia	7,100	
X	July 11, 2015	Seahawks Gdynia	28–21	Panthers Wrocław	Stadion Miejski	Wrocław	14,100	
XI	July 16, 2016	Panthers Wrocław	56–13	Seahawks Gdynia	Stadion Miejski	Białystok	5,300	
XII	June 25, 2017	Panthers Wrocław	55–21	Seahawks Gdynia	Stadion Miejski	Łódź	5,100	
XIII	July 22, 2018	Warsaw Eagles	33–12	Kozły Poznań	Dozbud Arena	Ząbki, near Warsaw		
XIV	July 20, 2019	Warsaw Eagles	20–0 (w/o)	Bydgoszcz Archers	Dozbud Arena	Ząbki, near Warsaw	not played	

=== LFA ===
Game	Date	Winning team	Score	Losing team	Venue	City	Attendance	Ref
XIII	July 21, 2018	Lowlanders Białystok	14–13	Panthers Wrocław	Stadion Olimpijski	Wrocław	4,000	
XIV	June 29, 2019	Panthers Wrocław	28–14	Lowlanders Białystok	Stadion Olimpijski	Wrocław	4,500	
XV	November 14, 2020	Panthers Wrocław	48–12	Lowlanders Białystok	Stadion Olimpijski	Wrocław	0	

=== PFL ===
Game	Date	Winning team	Score	Losing team	Venue	City	Attendance	Ref
XVI	July 17, 2021	Bydgoszcz Archers	27–7	Tychy Falcons	Dozbud Arena	Ząbki, near Warsaw		
XVII	July 23, 2022	Lowlanders Białystok	21–20	Kraków Kings	Dozbud Arena	Ząbki, near Warsaw		
XVIII	July 8, 2023	Lowlanders Białystok	38–35	Silesia Rebels	Stadion Miejski im. gen. Kazimierza Sosnkowskiego	Warsaw		
XIX	July 13, 2024	Warsaw Eagles	20–10	Lowlanders Białystok	Stadion Miejski im. gen. Kazimierza Sosnkowskiego	Warsaw		
XX	July 26, 2025	Warsaw Eagles	41–12	Warsaw Mets	Dozbud Arena	Ząbki, near Warsaw		
XXI	July 26, 2026	Warsaw Eagles	58–40	Panthers Wrocław	Stadion Olimpijski	Wrocław		

== Records by team ==
In the sortable table below, teams are ordered first by number of wins, then by number of appearances, and finally by year of first appearance. In the "Season(s)" column, bold years indicate winning seasons, and italic years indicate games not yet played.

App	Team	W	L	PCT	Season(s)
9	Warsaw Eagles	7	2	.778	2006, 2008, 2012, 2013, 2018, 2019, 2024, 2025, 2026
8	Panthers Wrocław	4	4	.500	2014, 2015, 2016, 2017, 2018, 2019, 2020, 2026
7	Pomorze Seahawks/Seahawks Gdynia	3	4	.429	2006, 2008, 2012, 2014, 2015, 2016, 2017
6	Lowlanders Białystok	3	3	.500	2018, 2019, 2020, 2022, 2023, 2024
5	The Crew/Giants Wrocław	3	2	.600	2007, 2009, 2010, 2011, 2013
3	AZS Silesia Miners/Rebels	1	2	.333	2007, 2009, 2023
2	Devils Wrocław	1	1	.500	2010, 2011
2	Bydgoszcz Archers	1	1	.500	2019, 2021
1	Kozły Poznań	0	1	.000	2018
1	Tychy Falcons	0	1	.000	2021
1	Kraków Kings	0	1	.000	2022
1	Warsaw Mets	0	1	.000	2025

=== Rematches ===
The following teams have faced each other more than once in the Polish Bowl:

- 4 times – Panthers Wrocław (2016 and 2017) and Seahawks Gdynia (2014 and 2015)
- 3 times – Warsaw Eagles (2006 and 2008) and Pomorze Seahawks/Seahawks Gdynia (2012)
- 3 times – Panthers Wrocław (2019 and 2020) and Lowlanders Białystok (2018)
- 2 times – The Crew Wrocław (2007) and Silesia Miners (2009)
- 2 times – The Crew Wrocław (2011) and Devils Wrocław (2010)

== Venue ==
Five of eight Polish Bowls have been played in Warsaw (three at the RKS Marymont stadium and the last two at National Stadium). Two games have been played in Wrocław at the Olympic Stadium and the Niskie Łąki stadium. One game was played in Bielawa at the Bielawianka stadium.

== See also ==
- Polish American Football League
- Liga Futbolu Amerykańskiego
- Polish Football League
