= Bydgoszcz–Toruń metropolitan area =

Bydgoszcz–Toruń metropolitan area bydgosko-toruński obszar metropolitalny
- Metropolitan area
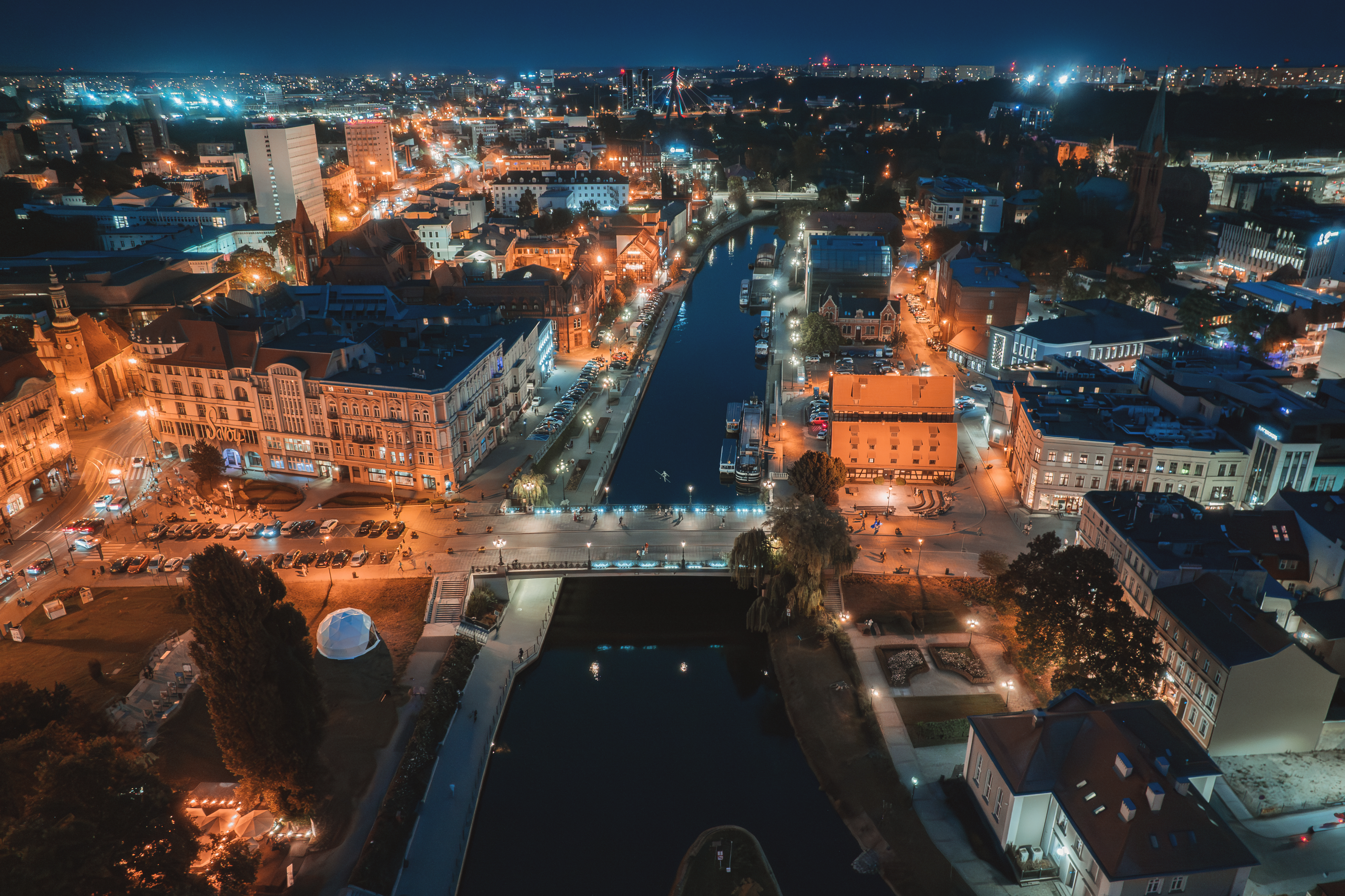
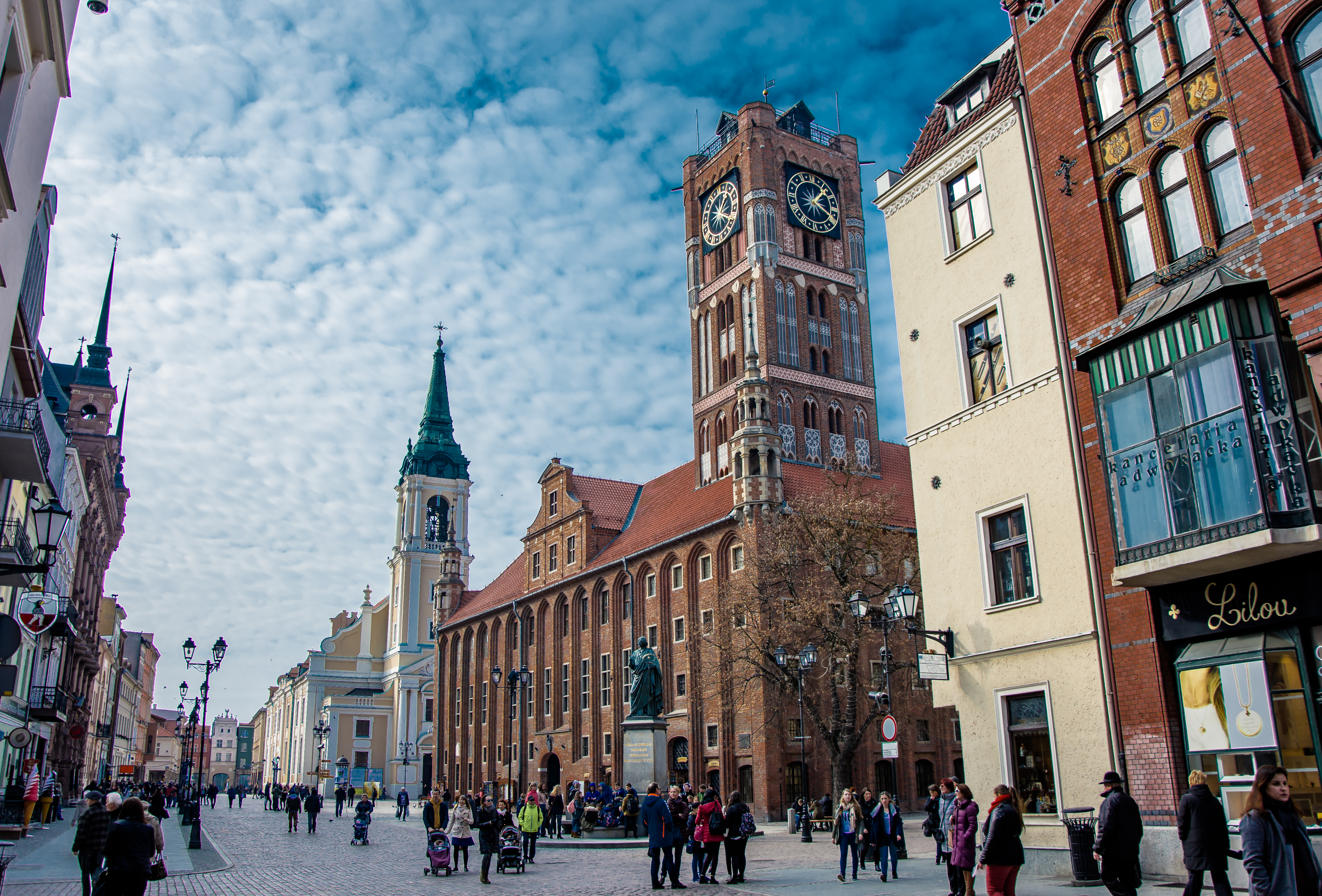
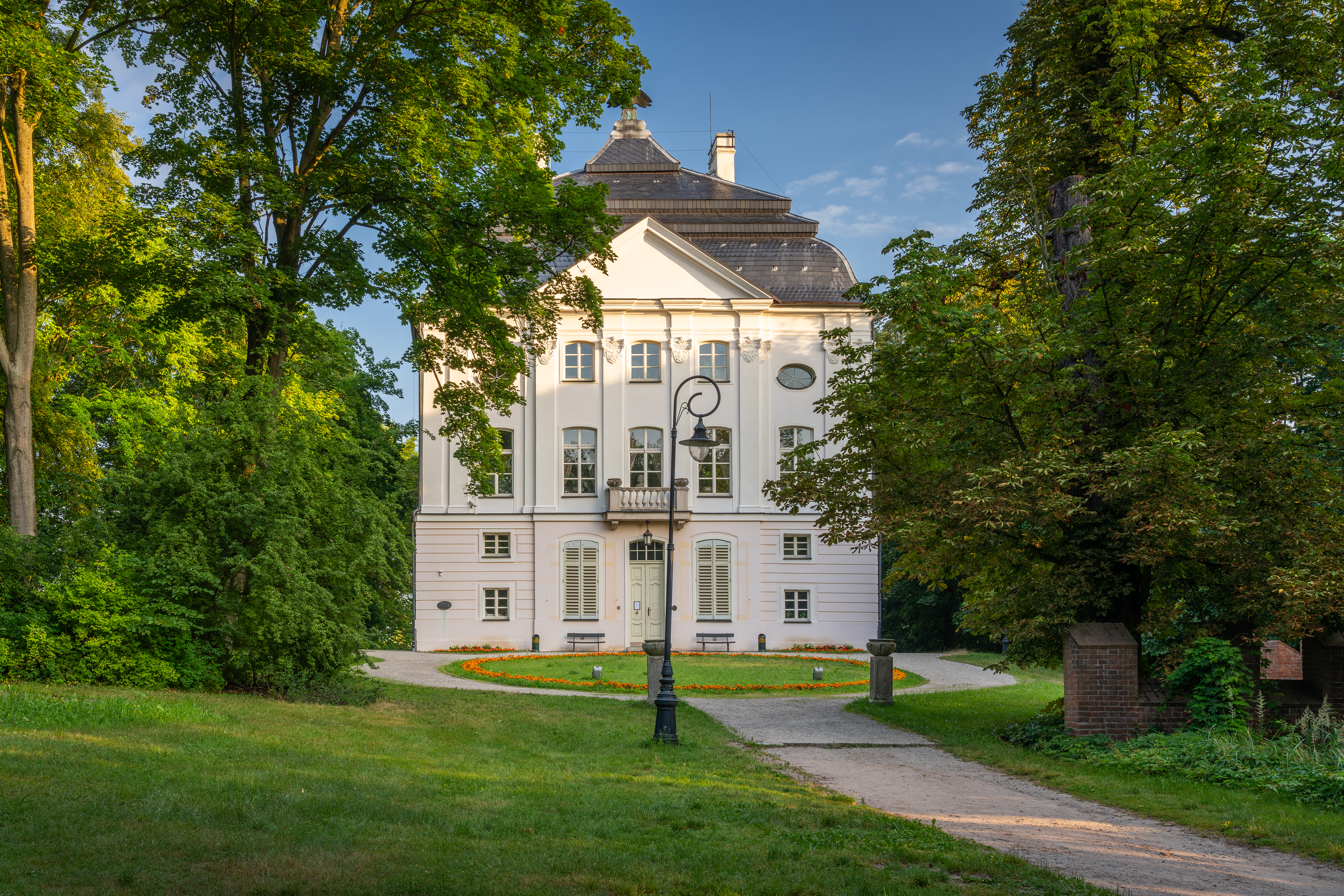
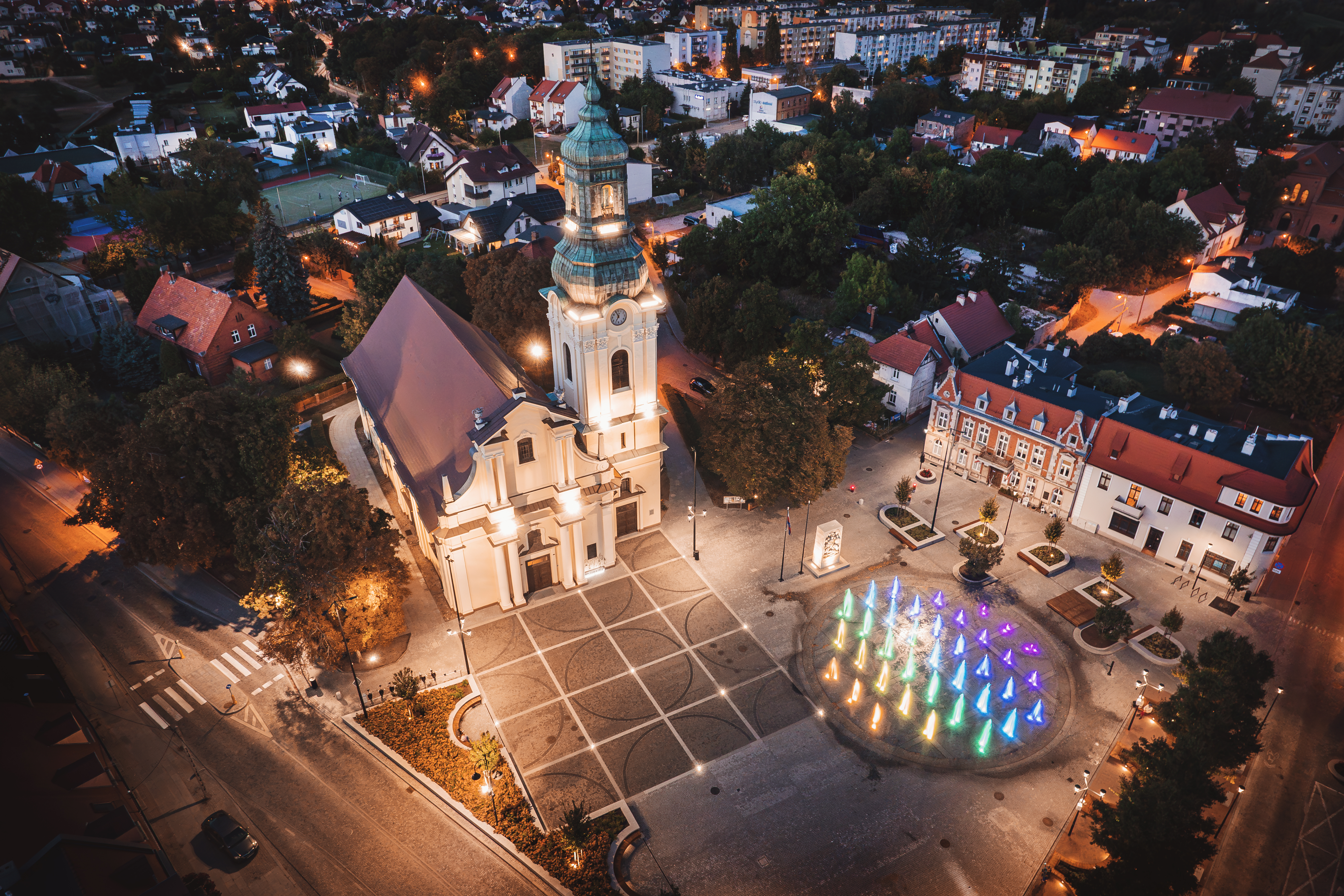
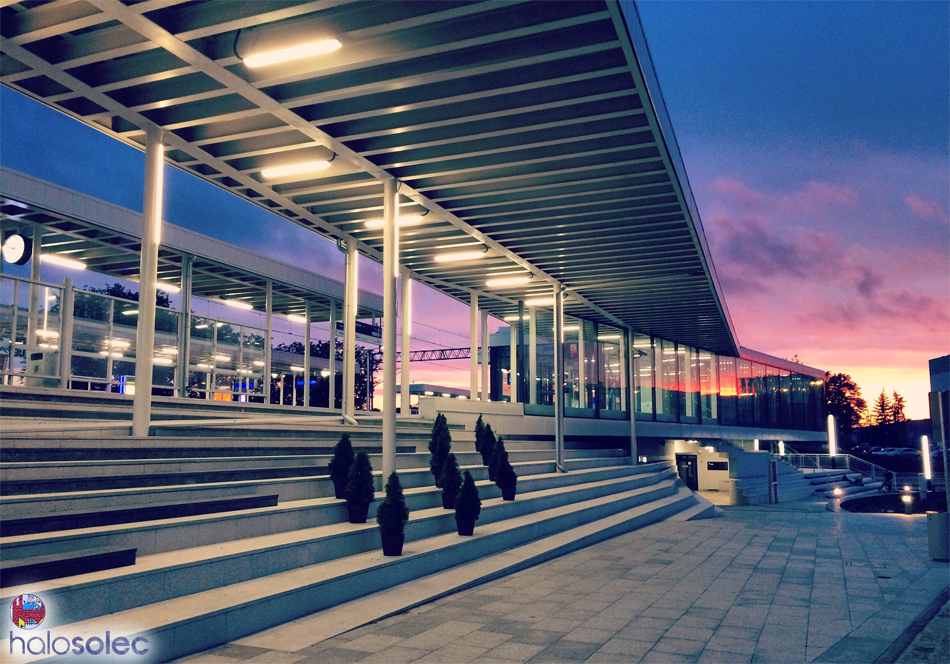
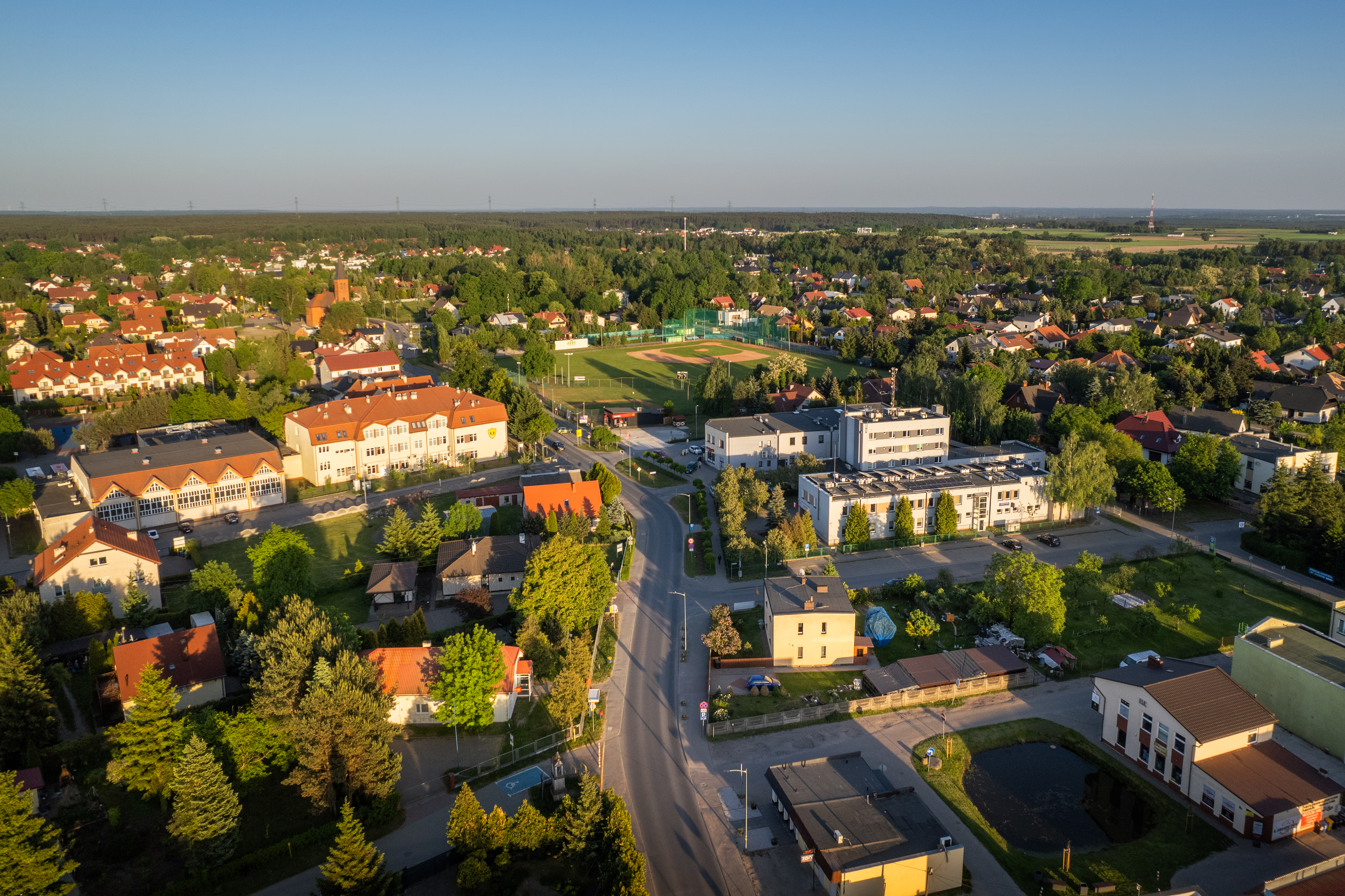
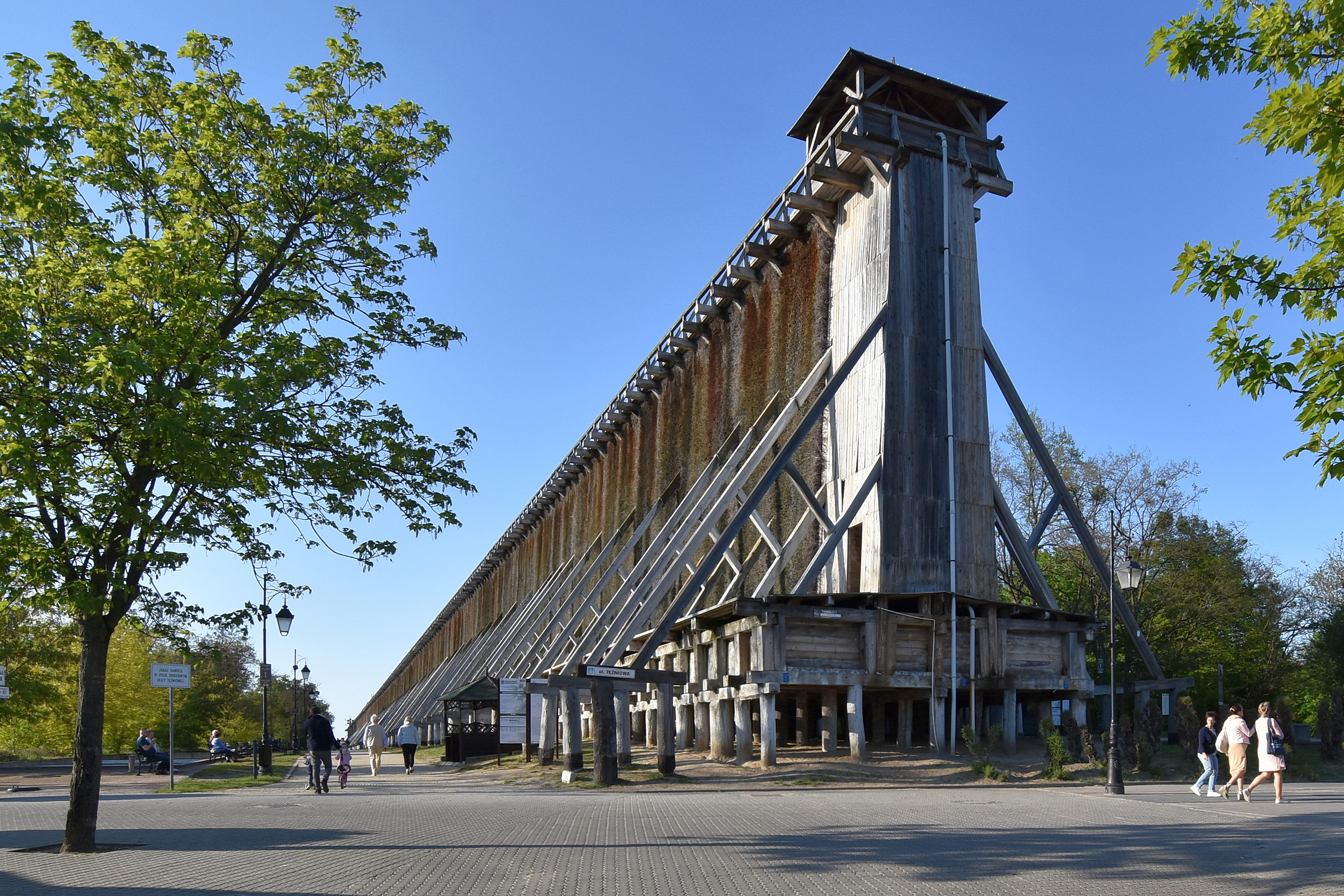
- From top, left to right: Aerial view of the Old Town in Bydgoszcz; Szeroka Street, Toruń; The Old Palace in Ostromecko; Aerial view of Old Fordon, Bydgoszcz; The train station in Solec Kujawski; The suburban area of Osielsko; The spa town of Ciechocinek

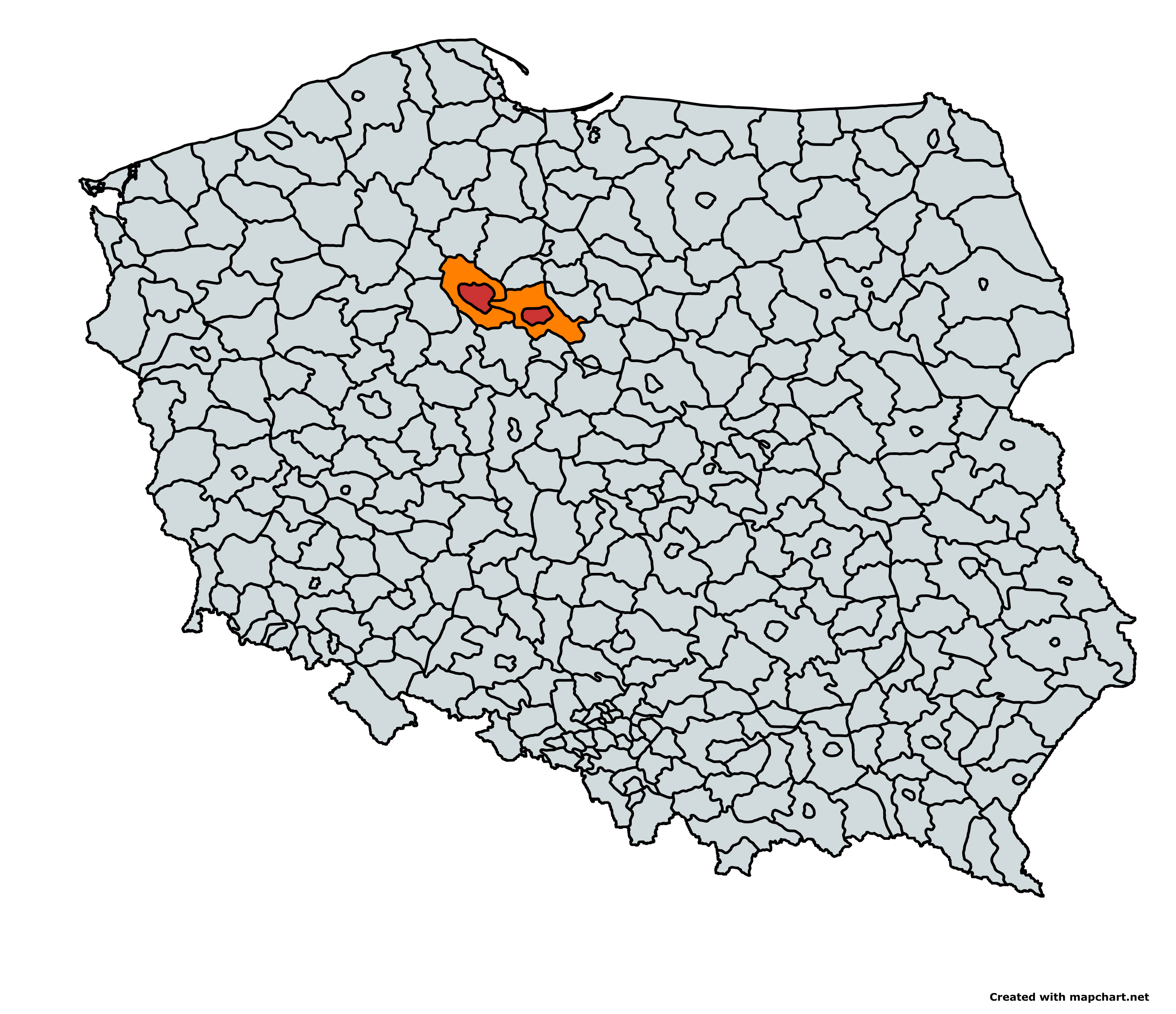
- Bydgoszcz city and Toruń city (red); Bydgoszcz County and Toruń County (orange)
- Country: Poland
- Region: Kuyavian-Pomeranian Voivodeship
- Largest city: Bydgoszcz

Area
  - Metro: 2,917 km^{2} (1,126 sq mi)

Population
  - Metro: 752,655
  - Metro density: 258.0/km^{2} (668.3/sq mi)

GDP
  - Metro: €11.904 billion (2021)
- Time zone: UTC+1 (CET)
  - Summer (DST): UTC+2 (CEST)
- Primary airport: Bydgoszcz Ignacy Jan Paderewski Airport

Bydgoszcz–Toruń metropolitan area (Polish: bydgosko-toruński obszar metropolitalny) is the name of the bi-polar metropolitan area in the middle of the Vistula river centered on the cities of Bydgoszcz and Toruń in north-central Poland. The distance between the built-up areas of the cities is about 30 km. They are the administrative capitals and economic centers of Kuyavian-Pomeranian Voivodeship.

The cities have traditionally been competitors through the centuries. In September 2004, the Medical Academy in Bydgoszcz joined Toruń University as Collegium Medicum in Bydgoszcz. This has usually been considered an important step in the integration process.

== Population ==
The total population of the two biggest cities combined (Bydgoszcz + Toruń), excluding adjacent communities:

- 1900: 81,839 inhabitants (52,204 + 29,635)
- 1910: 103,923 inhabitants (57,696 + 46,227)
- 1920: 121,354 inhabitants (84,054 + 37,300)
- 1931: 171,808 inhabitants (117,528 + 54,280)
- 1939: 224,275 inhabitants (143,075 + 81,200)
- 1946: 202,699 inhabitants (134,614 + 68,085)
- 1950: 243,161 inhabitants (162,524 + 80,637)
- 1955: 294,594 inhabitants (202,044 + 92,550)
- 1960: 336,913 inhabitants (232,007 + 104,906)
- 1995: 590,716 inhabitants (386,056 + 204,660)
- 2020: 545,197 inhabitants (344,091 + 201,106)

== History ==
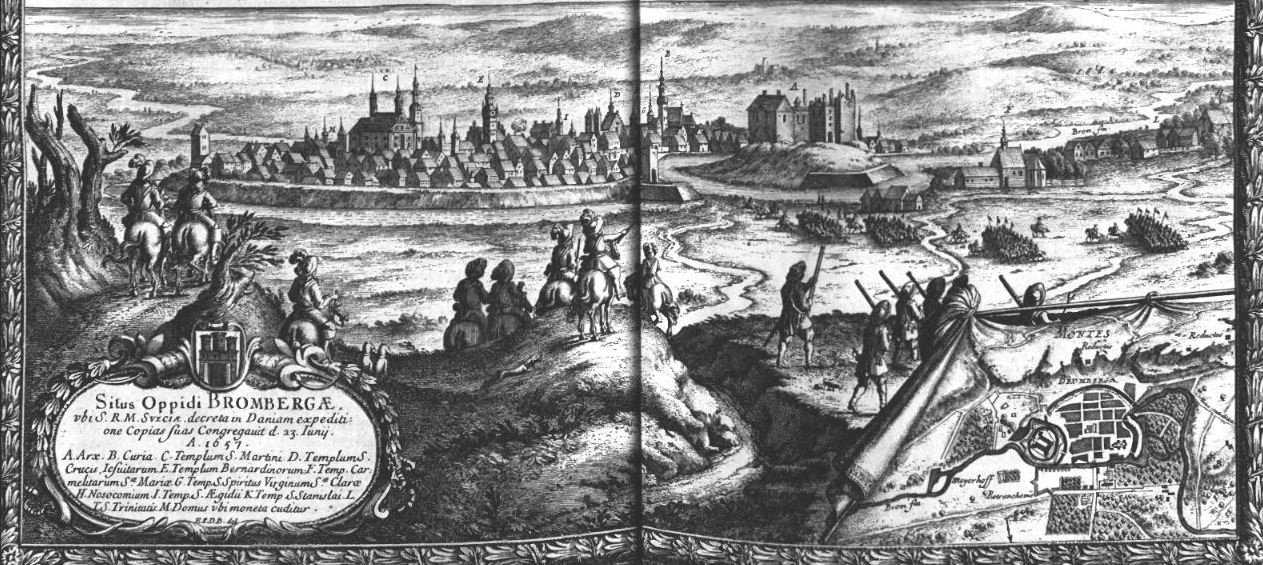
Bydgoszcz in 1657

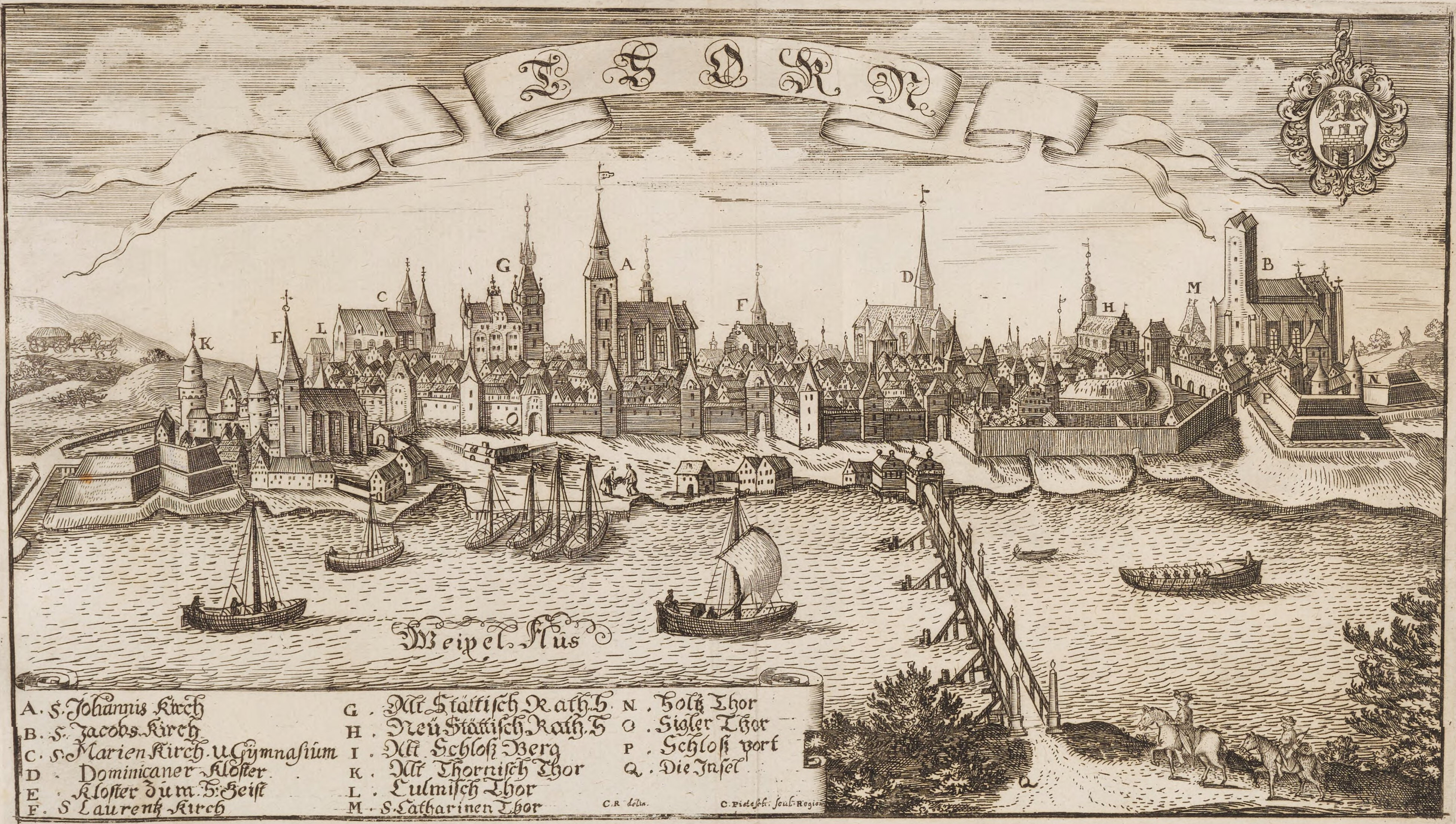
Toruń in 1500

Historically, Bydgoszcz and Toruń were the most important royal cities in the area. Both cities hosted sessions of the Polish Parliament, i.e. Bydgoszcz in 1520, and Toruń in 1576 and 1626. It is also where Peaces of Thorn and Treaty of Bromberg were signed. The two were parts of different administrative units for centuries, with Bydgoszcz starting as Polish and Toruń as Teutonic settlements, then becoming the biggest cities of Inowrocław Voivodeship and Chełmno Voivodeship in the Polish-Lithuanian Commonwealth, later in Germany of Bromberg district (Province of Posen) and Marienwerder district (West Prussia).

This would change only in the year of 1938, when Bydgoszcz was moved from the Poznań to the Pomeranian Voivodeship with Toruń, soon to take the role of the capital of the whole region.

The postwar growth of the cities and the new political administrative landscape led to application of the term "Bydgoszcz-Toruń metropolitan area" which first appeared in the 1960s.

== Education ==
- Nicolaus Copernicus University in Toruń
- Casimir the Great University in Bydgoszcz
- Bydgoszcz University of Science and Technology
- Nicolaus Copernicus University Ludwik Rydygier Collegium Medicum in Bydgoszcz
- Feliks Nowowiejski Music Academy, Bydgoszcz
- Jagiellonian College, Toruń
- WSB Merito Universities

== Sights ==
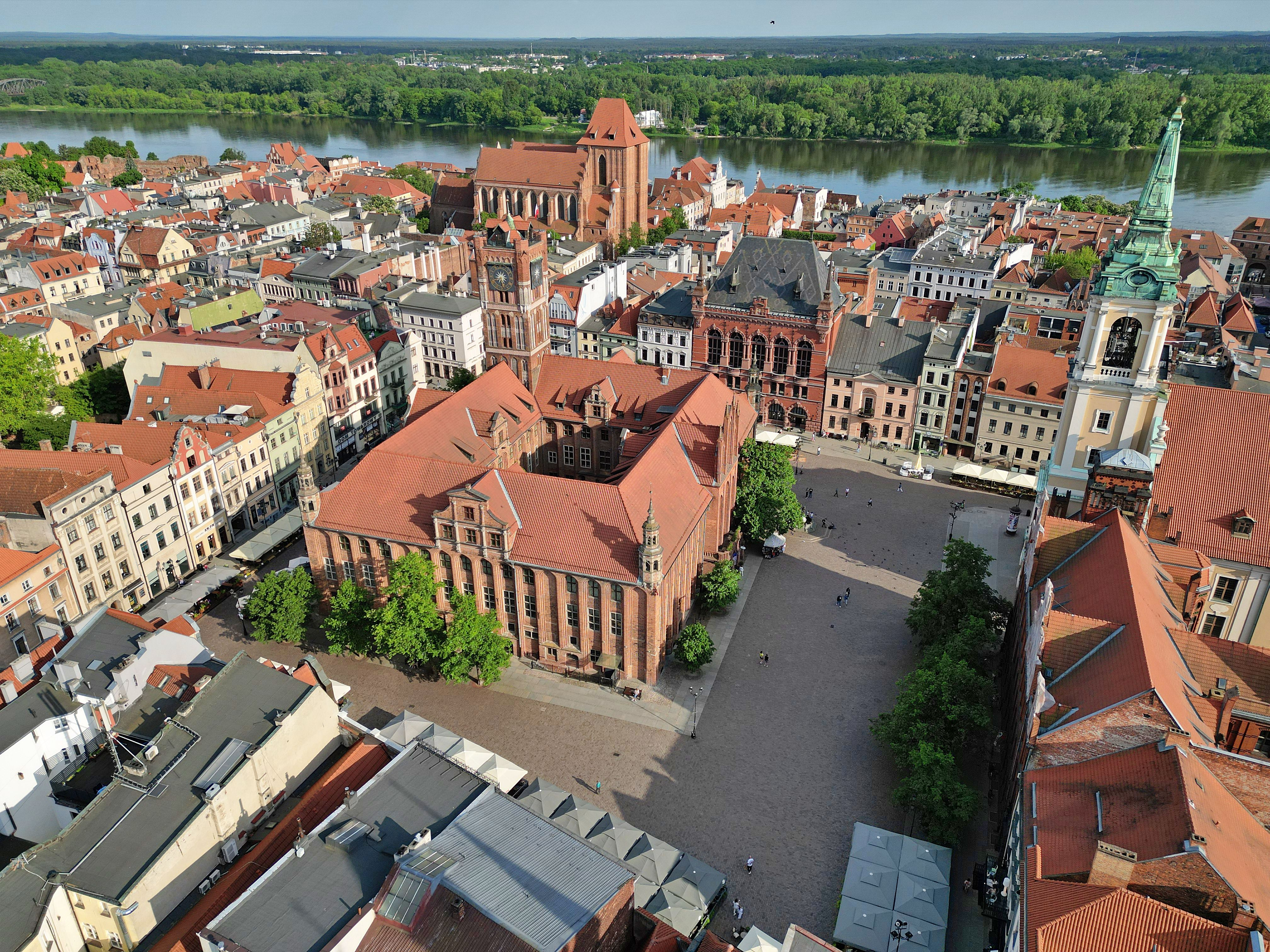
Old Town of Toruń, UNESCO World Heritage Site

The main sights of the agglomeration are the old towns of Bydgoszcz and Toruń, with the latter listed as a World Heritage Site. The local spa town is Ciechocinek, and its graduation towers, saline and spa parks are declared a Historic Monument of Poland.

The metropolitan area is rich in historic architecture ranging from Romanesque and Gothic architecture to Renaissance, Baroque and Art Nouveau. There are also several castles and palaces, including Dybów, Zamek Bierzgłowski, Ostromecko, Żołędowo. The Dybów Castle was the place where in 1454 King Casimir IV Jagiellon issued the famous Statutes of Nieszawa, covering a set of privileges for the Polish nobility; an event that is regarded as the birth of the noble democracy in Poland, which lasted until the late-18th-century Partitions of Poland.

Bydgoszcz and Toruń host major museums and art galleries, including the Leon Wyczółkowski Regional Museum in Bydgoszcz and District Museum in Toruń. The more unique museums include:

- Copernicus House in Toruń, museum dedicated to Nicolaus Copernicus
- European Museum of Money at the former Polish Royal Mint in Bydgoszcz
- Museum of Toruń Gingerbread in Toruń
- Museum of Far Eastern Art in the Under the Star Tenement House in Toruń
- Andrzej Szwalbe Collection of Historical Pianos at the palace in Ostromecko, one of two largest such collections in Poland
- Exploseum in Bydgoszcz, operated at the site of a former Nazi German arms factory.

== Sports ==
The region hosts a number of professional sports teams and large recreational sports facilities, including a motorcycle speedway and indoor sports stadium.

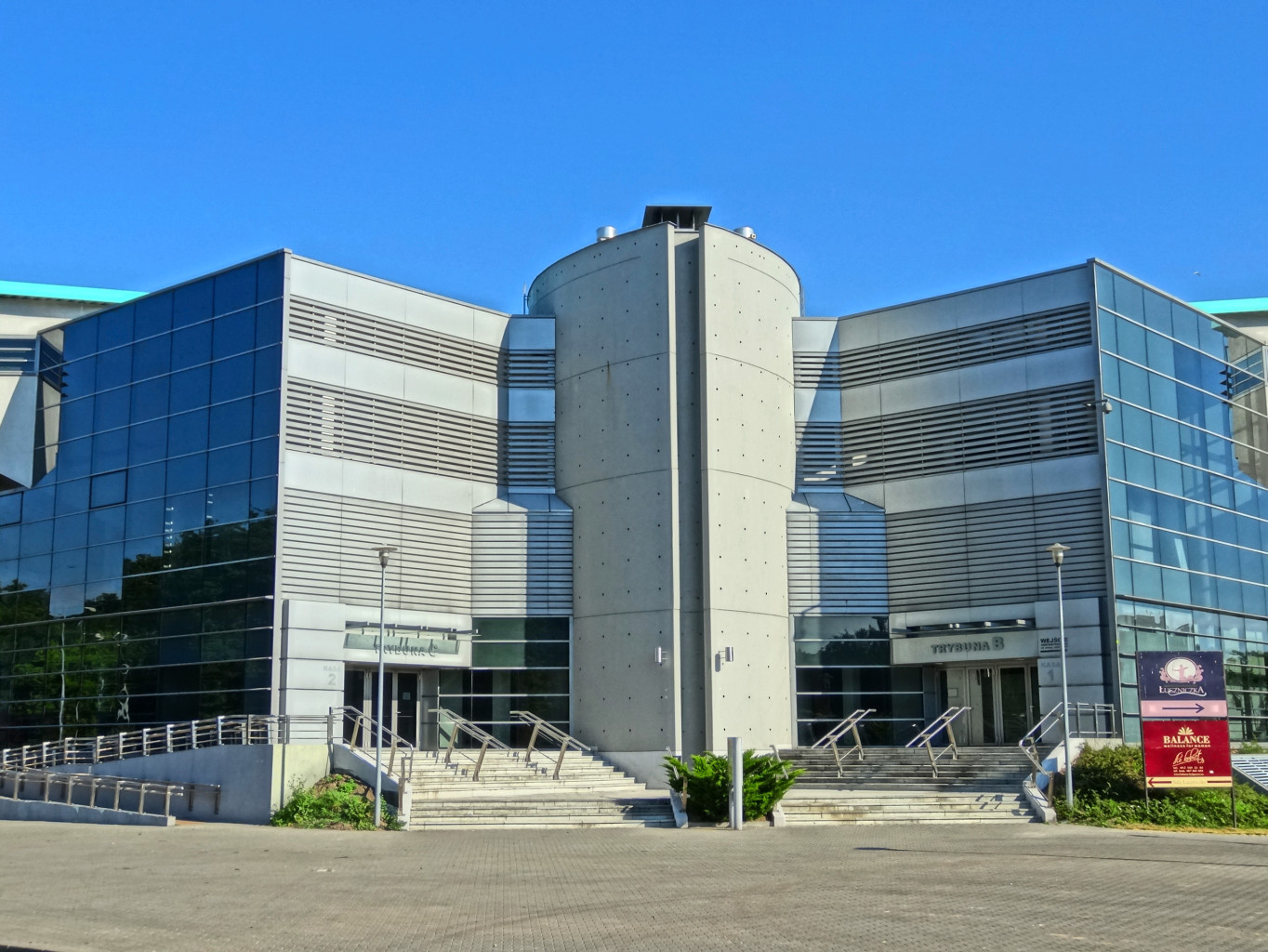
Łuczniczka indoor arena in Bydgoszcz, one of the arenas of the EuroBasket 2009, EuroBasket Women 2011 and 2014 FIVB Volleyball Men's World Championship

Professional sports teams
Club	Sport	League	Trophies
Polonia Bydgoszcz	Speedway	1 Liga	7 Polish Championships
KS Toruń	Speedway	Ekstraliga	4 Polish Championships
Twarde Pierniki Toruń	Basketball (men's)	Polish Basketball League	1 Polish Cup (2018)
Astoria Bydgoszcz	Basketball (men's)	I Liga	0
Basket 25 Bydgoszcz	Basketball (women's)	Basket Liga Kobiet	1 Polish Cup (2018)
Katarzynki Toruń	Basketball (women's)	Basket Liga Kobiet	0
KS Toruń HSA	Ice hockey	Polska Hokej Liga	1 Polish Cup (2005)
BKS Visła Bydgoszcz	Volleyball (men's)	I liga	0
Anioły Toruń	Volleyball (men's)	I liga	0
Pałac Bydgoszcz	Volleyball (women's)	Tauron Liga	1 Polish Championship (1993); 3 Polish Cups (1992, 2001, 2005)
Zawisza Bydgoszcz	Football (men's)	III liga	1 Polish Cup (2014)
Elana Toruń	Football (men's)	III liga	0
KKP Bydgoszcz	Football (women's)	I liga	0
FC Toruń	Futsal (men's)	Ekstraklasa	0
Pomorzanin Toruń	Field hockey (men's)	Superliga	3 Polish Championships (1990, 2014, 2023)
Bydgoszcz Archers	American football	Polish Football League	1 Polish Championship (2021)
Angels Toruń	American football	Polish Football League	0

== See also ==
- Metropolitan areas in Poland
- Bydgoszcz metropolitan area
