= Metropolitans =

Metropolitans may refer to:

Sports

- New York Metropolitans (1880–1887), a defunct Major League New Baseball team
- New York Mets (1962–present), a Major League Baseball team
- Seattle Metropolitans (1915–1924), a Seattle ice hockey team
- Bydgoszcz–Toruń Metropolitans (BiT Mets) (2012–present), a Bydgoszcz-Toruń bi-polar agglomeration American football reserve team of Angels Toruń and Bydgoszcz Archers
- Metropolitans 92, a basketball team currently playing in France's top men's division, LNB Pro A

Other uses

- Metropolia, or metropolis, Christian term for the jurisdiction under a Metropolitan bishop, who might also be known as a Metropolitan.

== See also ==
- Metropolitan (disambiguation)
