= 2015 PLFA season =

- League: PLFA
- Sport: American football

Seasons
- ← 2014 2016 →

The 2015 season of the Polish American Football League (Polish League of American Football) the 10th season played by the american football league in Poland. This is the first time in league history that a foreign team has joined one of the leagues (in PLFA8 development). The foreign team is from Kaliningrad, Russia.

== Topliga ==
| Team | City | Found | Stadium | Capacity | |
|---|---|---|---|---|---|
| Husaria Szczecin | Szczecin | 2008 | MOSRiR Szczecin | ? | promotion from PLFAI |
| Kozły Poznań | Poznań | 2007 | Młodzieżowy Ośrodek Sportowy | ? | |
| Lowlanders Białystok | Białystok | 2008 | MOSP Jagiellonia | 5,000 | promotion from PLFAI |
| Panthers Wrocław | Wrocław | 2013 | Olympic Stadium | 35'000 | former Giants + Devils |
| Seahawks Gdynia | Gdynia | 2006 | National Rugby Stadium | 2,425 | |
| Warsaw Eagles | Warsaw | 2006 | Stadion Polonii Warszawa | 6'800 | |
| Warsaw Sharks | Warsaw | 2007 | Bemowski Ośrodek Piłki Nożnej | 980 | former Spartans+Królewscy |
| Zagłębie Steelers | Będzin | 2008 | OSiR Będzin | 10'000 | |

=== Results table ===
| Team | Week | | | | | | | | | |
| Team | 1 | 2 | 3 | 4 | 5 | 6 | 7 | 8 | 9 | 10 |
|---|---|---|---|---|---|---|---|---|---|---|
| Panthers Wrocław (PAN) | @LOW 0-49 | @KOZ 7-56 | EAG 37-14 | HUS 55-12 | @SEA 0-33 | STE 65-6 | @SHA 16-42 | @EAG 14-45 | SEA 35-7 | KOZ 55-6 |
| Seahawks Gdynia (SEA) | KOZ 55-20 | @EAG 31-47 | SHA 48-18 | @STE 12-49 | PAN 0-33 | @LOW 32-35 | EAG 28-27 | @KOZ 13-42 | @PAN 35-7 | HUS 27-8 |
| Lowlanders Białystok (LOW) | PAN 0-49 | HUS 36-29 | @STE 12-33 | @EAG 28-14 | STE 46-0 | SEA 32-35 | @HUS 3-34 | @SHA 33-46 | @KOZ 26-46 | SHA 47-8 |
| Warsaw Eagles (EAG) | @SHA 6-29 | SEA 31-47 | @PAN 37-14 | LOW 28-14 | @KOZ 6-36 | KOZ 41-8 | @SEA 28-27 | PAN 14-45 | @HUS 27-36 | STE 38-6 |
| Husaria Szczecin (HUS) | STE 18-12 | @LOW 36-29 | KOZ 20-36 | @PAN 55-12 | @SHA 0-33 | SHA 47-35 | LOW 3-34 | @STE 6-31 | EAG 27-36 | @SEA 27-8 |
| Zagłębie Steelers (STE) | @HUS 18-12 | LOW 12-33 | SEA 12-49 | @LOW 46-0 | @PAN 65-6 | KOZ 13-12 | HUS 6-31 | SHA 27-12 | @EAG 38-6 | @SHA 14-36 |
| Warsaw Sharks (SHA) | EAG 6-29 | @SEA 48-18 | @KOZ 13-18 | HUS 0-33 | @HUS 47-35 | PAN 16-42 | LOW 33-46 | STE 27-12 | LOW 47-8 | STE 14-36 |
| Kozły Poznań (PAN) | @SEA 55-20 | PAN 7-56 | @HUS 20-36 | SHA 13-18 | EAG 6-36 | @EAG 41-8 | @STE 13-12 | SEA 13-42 | LOW 26-46 | @PAN 55-6 |

== PLFAI ==
=== north division ===
| Team | City | Found | Stadium | Capacity | |
|---|---|---|---|---|---|
| Angels Toruń | Toruń | 2012 | Municipal Stadium | 6'000 | promotion from PLFAII |
| Cougars Szczecin | Szczecin | 2012 | MOSRiR Szczecin | ? | |
| Crusaders Warszawa | Warsaw | 2013 | DOSiR Praga-Północ | 500 | won PLFAI/PLFAII postseason elimination game with Gliwice Lions |
| Seahawks Sopot | Sopot | 2012 | Ogniwo Sopot | 1'500 | promotion from PLFAII, former Sabercats |
| Wilki Łódzkie | Łódź | 2012 | Łodzianka | ? | |

=== south division ===
- Kraków Kings
- Saints Częstochowa (promotion from PLFAII)
- Silesia Rebels (promotion from PLFAII)
- Tychy Falcons
- Tytani Lublin

== PLFAII ==
=== Northwest Division ===
- Bydgoszcz Archers
- Griffons Słupsk
- Dragons Zielona Góra
- Gorzów Grizzlies (PLFA8)
- Patrioci Poznań
- Wikingowie Gdańsk (new team)

=== Central Division ===
- Greenducks Radom
- Warsaw Eagles B
- Warsaw Sharks B
- Olsztyn Lakers
- Rhinos Wyszków (new team)
- Warsaw Dukes (new team)

=== Southwest Division ===
- Bielawa Owls (relegation from PLFAI)
- Panthers Wrocław B
- Wrocław Outlaws
- Wolverines Opole
- Oleśnica Outlaws (new team)

=== Southeast Division ===
- Gliwice Lions (relegation from PLFAI, lost PLFAI/PLFAII postseason elimination game with Crusaders Warszawa)
- Silvers Olkusz
- Rybnik Thunders
- Pretorians Skoczów
- Kraków Tigers (return to the league)
- Highlanders Beskidy (new team)

== PLFA8 ==
eight-man football senior development league

=== A (baltic division) ===
- Korsarze Koszalin (new team)
- Wikingowie Gdańsk B
- Kaliningrad Amber Hawks RUS (new team)

=== B (northeast division) ===
- Kurpie Ostrołęka
- LowLanders Białystok B
- Rhinos Wyszków B
- Crusaders Warszawa B

=== C (central division) ===
- Mustangs Płock (relegation from PLFAI)
- OldBoys Warszawa (new team)
- Kozminski Leons
- Warsaw Dukes B

=== D (southeast division) ===
- Aviator Mielec
- Rzeszów Rockets (new team, replace Ravens Rzeszów)
- Przemyśl Bears

=== E (southwest division) ===
- Kozły Poznań
- Warriors Lubin (new team)
- Jaguars Kąty Wrocławskie (new team)

=== F (northwest division) ===
- Husaria Szczecin B
- Gorzów Grizzlies B
- Bulldogs Poznań (new team)

== PLFAJ ==
eight-man football junior (14–17 years old)

=== A ===
- Cougars Szczecin
- Gorzów Grizzlies
- Griffons Słupsk

=== B ===
- Angels Toruń
- Bydgoszcz Archers
- Patrioci Poznań
- Kozły Poznań

=== C ===
- Olsztyn Lakers
- Warsaw Eagles
- Warsaw Sharks

=== D ===
- Bielawa Owls
- Gliwice Lions
- Panthers Wrocław
- Zagłębie Steelers

=== E ===
- Aviators Mielec/ Przemyśl Bears
- Kraków Kings
- Silesia Rebels
- Tychy Falcons

== PLFAJ-11 ==
eleven-man football junior u-18

- Angels Toruń
- Cougars Szczecin
- Crusaders Warszawa
- Gorzów Grizzlies
- Husaria Szczecin
- Mustangs Płock
- Olsztyn Lakers
- Panthers Wrocław
- Seahawks Gdynia
- Tytani Lublin
- Warsaw Eagles

== See also ==
- 2015 in sports
