= Bydgoszcz Raiders =

General information
- Founded: 2012
- Folded: 2013
- Headquartered: Bydgoszcz, Poland
- Colours: Blue, White and Red

League / conference affiliations
- Polish American Football League; PLFA II

The Bydgoszcz Raiders were an American football team based in Bydgoszcz, Poland That played in the 2nd division of the Polish American Football League.

== History ==
The origins of American football in Bydgoszcz back to 2008, when it began to create a team called Bydgoszcz Raiders. In 2009 the team changed his name to Bydgoszcz Archers. In 2012 some players of the Archers founded a new team called Bydgoszcz Raiders.

== Season-by-season records ==
=== PLFA ===
Season	League	Division	Finish	Wins	Losses	Ties	Ref
2013	PLFA II	North	6th in Division	1	5	0	
