= Bydgoszcz Mint =

Historical mint in Bydgoszcz

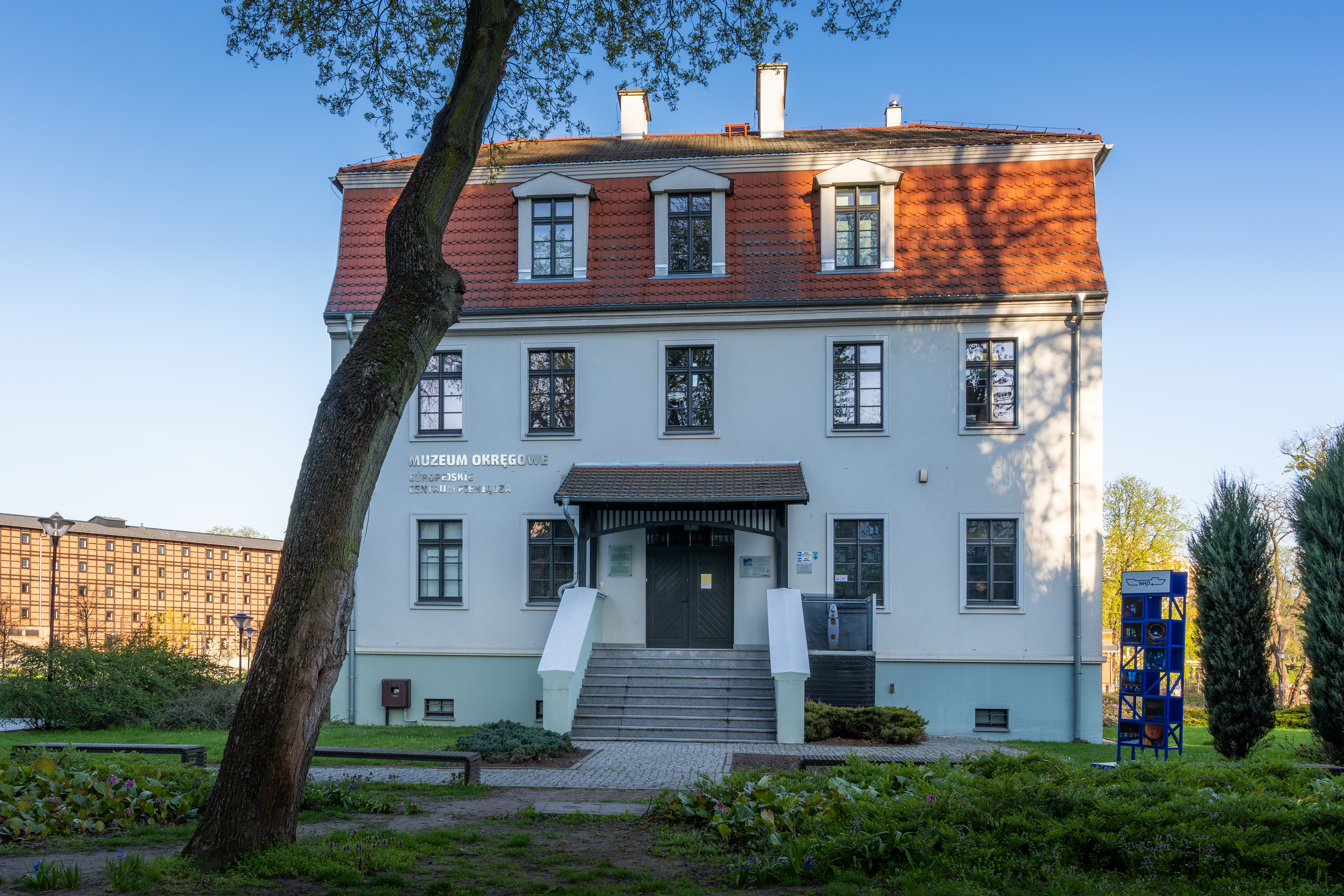
Museum building at the site of the mint (Credit: Mariusz Guć)

The Bydgoszcz Mint was a mint in Bydgoszcz, Poland. It primarily operated during the 17th century, and it was one of the most important mints in the Polish-Lithuanian Commonwealth during this time. According to CoinWeek, coins minted by the Bydgoszcz Mint have set auction records in the 21st century and are some of the most valuable coins known.

== History ==
=== Private mint ===
The city of Bydgoszcz received minting rights in the 14th century due to location privilege. However, coin production only began in 1594 under the auspices of a private mint. The facilities of the early mint were on Mill Island, and the mint gradually grew to occupy a substantial portion of the island.

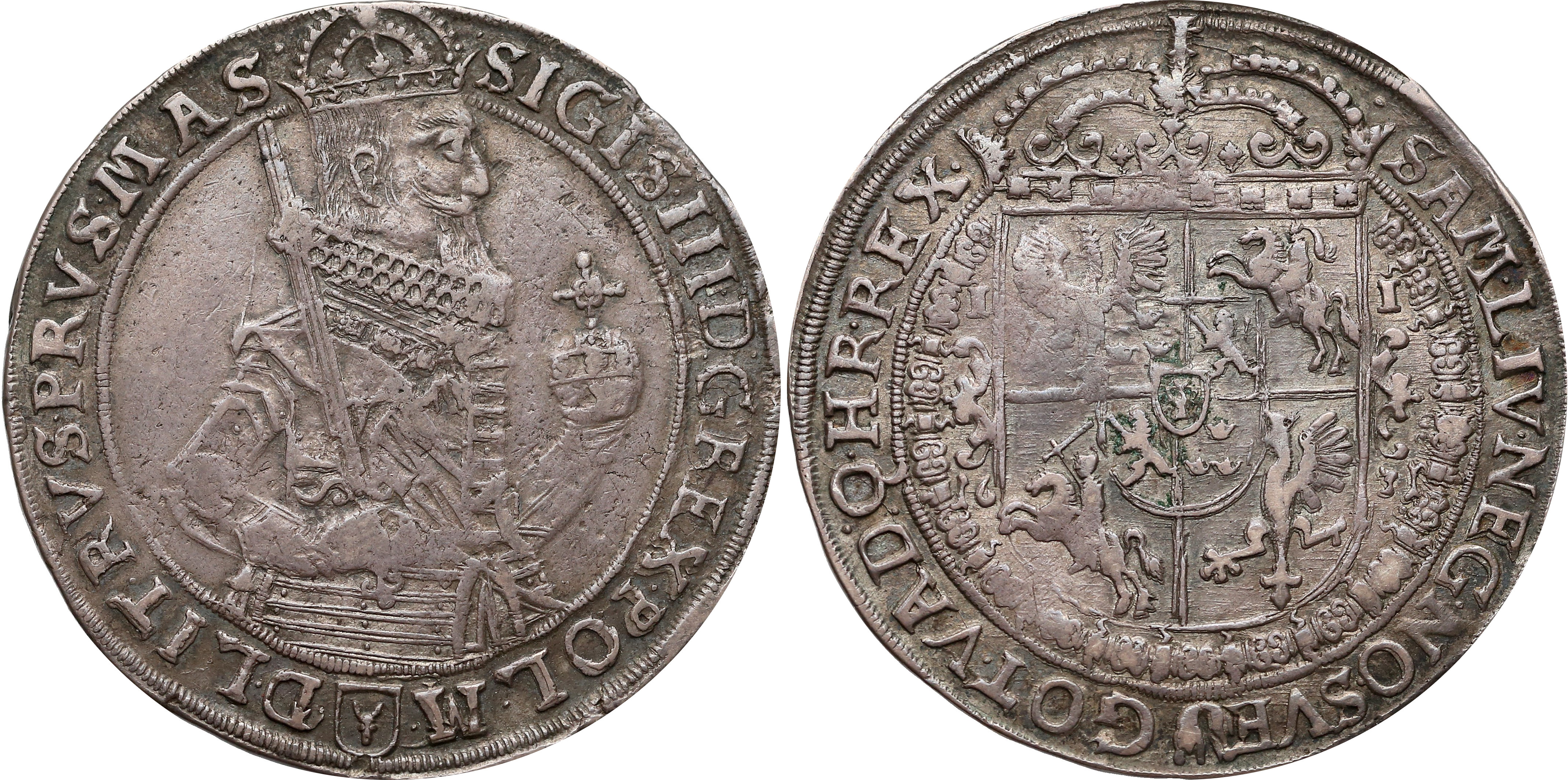
Talar depicting King Sigismund Vasa

=== Royal mint ===
The mint eventually transitioned from a private to a royal mint and produced coins depicting King Sigismund Vasa. Some of the coins produced were grosz, thalers, and ducats. The mint ceased operation in 1688, and most of the original buildings were gone by 1774. However, other sources mention a mint director, Ernst Hecht, who operated at the mint until 1714.

== Notable coins ==
=== 1621 100 ducats ===
According to CoinWeek and Stack's Bowers, the royal mint at Bydgoszcz produced gold coins denominated as 100 ducats to commemorate the Polish victory over the Turkish army at Khotyn. Samuel Ammon engraved the dies for the 100-ducat coin. In 2008, one example set an auction record for non-U.S. coins when it sold for $1,380,000. In 2018, another set another record when it sold for $2,160,000. Fourteen examples of this coin are known to exist.

=== 1621 80 ducats ===
According to Barron's, the royal mint also produced a coin denominated as 80 ducats. It is similar in size and design to the 100 ducats coin, but thinner. Only one is known to exist.
