= Elana Toruń =

Polish football club

- Full name: ZKS Elana 1968 sp. z o.o.
- Nickname: Elanowcy
- Founded: 28 August 1968; 57 years ago
- Ground: Grzegorz Duniecki Municipal Stadium
- Capacity: 4,275
- Chairman: Krystian Jukiel
- Manager: Mateusz Główczewski (interim)
- League: III liga, group II
- 2025–26: III liga, group II, 6th of 18
- Website: www.elanatorun.com
Home colours	Away colours

Elana Toruń is a Polish football club based in Toruń. It competes in group II of the III liga, fourth tier of the Polish football league system.

== History ==
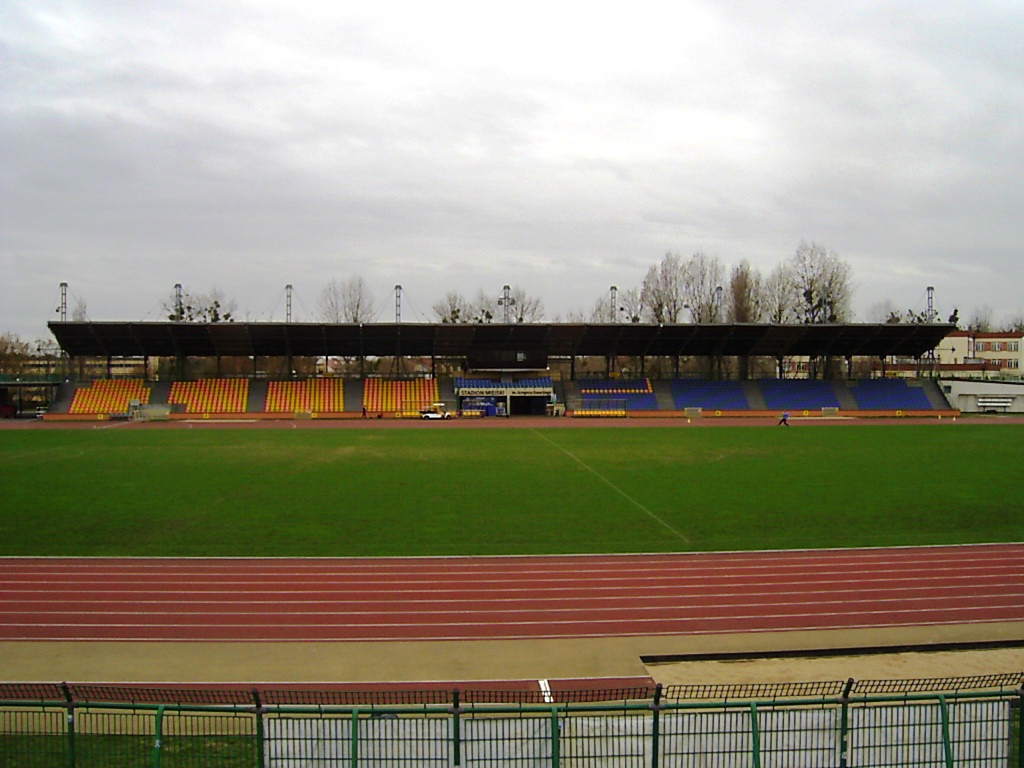
Stadion Miejski im. Grzegorza Duneckiego in Toruń

The team was at the second level of the Polish pyramid in the 1990s, but were relegated at the conclusion of the 1998–99 season. In the following season, the club changed their name to TKP Toruń, but they were relegated again to the fourth level. The club were often referred to as Toruński KP, but by the 2007–08 season, they had returned to their original name of Elana Toruń and were back playing on the Polish third level. During the 2021–22 season, the club declared bankruptcy and withdrew from the III liga. The reserve team continued playing in the Liga okręgowa, securing promotion to the IV liga, and became the new first team since the 2022–23 season, under the name Fundacja Akademia Futbolu Elana Toruń. In mid-2023, after earning promotion back to the III liga, the club had to change its legal entity and name to ZKS Elana 1968 sp. z o.o., a limited liability company, as foundations are not allowed to compete in the Polish fourth division.

== Supporters ==
Elana fans are commonly known as Elanowcy and include an ultras group of around 100-1000 (depending on match) fanatical supporters. Apart from Toruń, there are fan-clubs in Gniewkowo, Golub-Dobrzyń, Ostaszewo, Aleksandrów Kujawski, Ciechocinek, Kowalewo Pomorskie, Obrowo, Lubicz and Wąbrzeźno.

They have a long-standing collegiality with fans of Ruch Chorzów and KS Myszków (also Ruch fans), Widzew Łódź fans from Grudziądz, and more recently Wisła Kraków and KKS Kalisz fans.

As the city of Toruń has a rivalry with Bydgoszcz that extends even beyond sport, Elana competes the Cuiavian derby with Zawisza and Polonia. They also compete with fans of speedway club Apator Toruń.

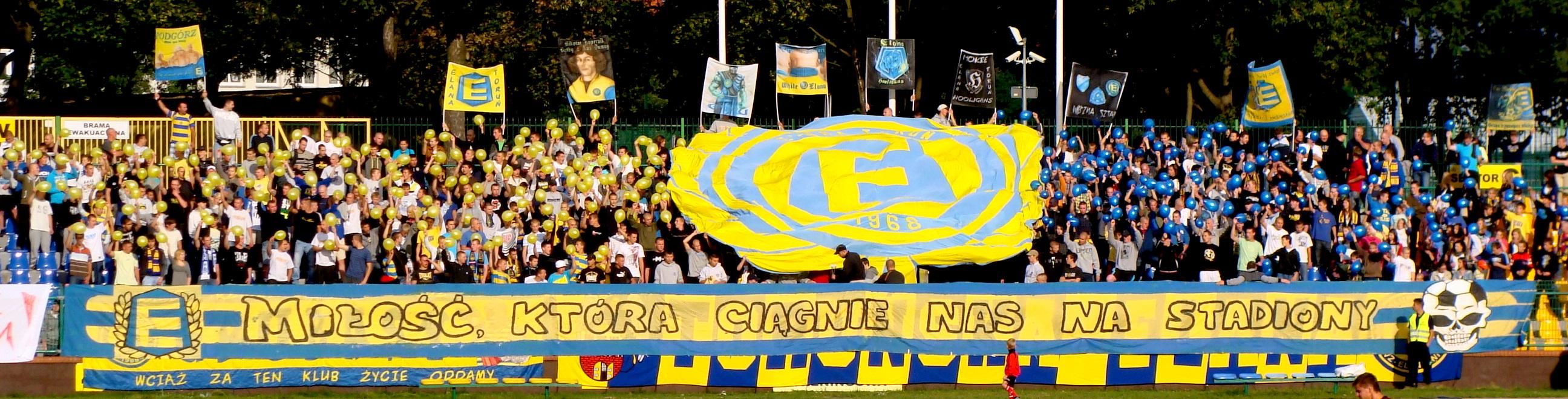
Elana Toruń v Chrobry Głogów (2011-09-17)
