= Angels Toruń =

General information
- Founded: 2011
- Stadium: Municipal Stadium (Toruń); 23/29 Józef Bem street, Toruń
- Headquartered: Toruń, Poland
- Colours: Sky and White
- Website: angelstorun.pl

Personnel
- Head coach: Matthew Kershey USA

Nickname
- pl. "Anioły"

League / conference affiliations
- Liga Futbolu Amerykańskiego; PFL 2

Current uniform
Home

Away

Angels Toruń is an American football team based in Toruń, Poland. The team currently competes in the PLFA II of Polish American Football League.The club also hosts the Angels Junior (PLFA J for under-17 players) and reserve team Metropolitans in eight-man football competitions PLFA 8.

== History ==
The team was founded on November 24, 2011. It was an open invitation and became the most effective recruitment in Poland with over 70 applicants. The high level of interest was recognised by its selection as the "sports event in 2011 in Torun" according to Gazeta Wyborcza. The club was officially registered on December 15, 2011 in the register of clubs conducted by the Mayor of Toruń at No 69. The Angels joined the PLFAII in 2012 PLFA season as the youngest team in league. On May 5, 2012 the team played their first league game, which was also the inauguration of PLFAII against Olsztyn Lakers, winning in debut 28:6.

The team name comes from Toruń coat of arms, which includes the Angel. Toruń is sometimes called the City of Angels. The Angels Cheerleaders are known as the "Angels Ladies". All home games are broadcast on www.kpsport.tv.

The team is heavily involved in charity activities and events. They are particularly well known for their unusual promotions. on April 23, 2012 the Angels players appeared in an artistic show "Antelope" by Polish performance group "Institute B61", along with Polish artists Mariusz Lubomski, Bartek Staszkiewicz (SOFA) and Wojtek Zadrużyński. On December 21, 2013 take part in another "Institute B61" performance show "Slapstick Operation" once again with Lubomski and Staszkiewicz; Zadrużyński has been replaced by SOFA drummer Robert Markiewicz. On June 7, 2012 the Angels organised what is widely considered to be the first ever football match in the city center- Old Market Square (the Stary Rynek) against Bydgoszcz Archers. September 2 in Inowrocław and on September 30 in Ciechocinek the Angels organized football friendly matches in the cities, where there are no current teams to popularize American football. On February 15, 2013 they became the 1st in the sport to record a now legendaryHarlem Shake (meme) video. On March 6, 2013 in Torun they played arena football at halftime of local derby Polski Cukier SIDEn Toruń- Astoria Bydgoszcz the men's first Polish basketball league, also playing against local rivals- Archers.

The club also runs a junior team (14–17 years old players) called the Angels Junior which competes in the Polish junior championship (PLFAJ) since the 2013 season. In 2012 six Angels players guest started in Warsaw Eagles junior team and achieved gold medals. In 2013, the Angels got their own junior team, which were promoted to the national finals in Bielawa. They finished in 8th place in Polish National Junior Championship. Furthermore, on November 11, 2013 Słupsk they won "National Independence Day Cup" against the Griffons.

== Season-by-season records ==
PLFA champions (2006–2007); PLFA I champions (2008–2011); PLFA Topliga (2012–present)	PLFA II champions (2008–2011); PLFA I champions (2012–present)	Championship Game appearances

Season	League	Division	Finish	Wins	Losses	Postseason results	Ref
2014	PLFA II	North	2nd	5	1	1-1 (PLFAI promotion)	
2014 (junior)	PLFA J	A	1st	4	0	2-1 (5th in PLFAJ)	
2013	PLFA II	North	4th	4	2	-	
2013 (junior)	PLFA J	A	8th	2	2	0-3	
2012	PLFA II	North	4th	2	4	—	

== Game-by-game record ==
2012

- May 5- Toruń v. Olsztyn Lakers 28:6 W
- May 19- Warsaw @ Królewscy Warszawa 14:23 L
- June 7- Bydgoszcz @ Bydgoszcz Archers (exhibition game)
- June 17- Toruń v. Cougars Szczecin 0:42 L
- July 29- Sopot @ Sabercats Sopot 8:20 L
- August 25- Szczecin @ Cougars Szczecin 0:30 L
- September 2- Inowrocław v. Bydgoszcz Archers 24:7 W (exhibition game)
- September 9- Toruń v. Warsaw Werewolves 24:6 W
- September 30- Ciechocinek v. Sabercats Sopot 14:20OT L (exhibition game)

2013

- March 23- Toruń v. Lowlanders Białystok 0:21 L (exhibition game)
- April 7- Toruń v. Crusaders Warszawa 50:6 W (exhibition game)
- May 5- Bydgoszcz @ Bydgoszcz Archers 24:35 W
- May 26- Toruń v. Cougars Szczecin 19:21 L
- June 22- Gdynia @ Seahawks Gdynia 16:22 W
- July 6- Toruń v. Bydgoszcz Raiders 40:14 W
- July 27- Słupsk @ Griffons Słupsk 0:32 W
- August 17- Metropolitans Toruń/Bydgoszcz @ Ostrołęka (reserve team tournament)
  - v. Sabercats B Sopot 12:34 L
  - v. Kurpie Ostrołęka 12:24 L
- August 24- Toruń v. Sabercats Sopot 15:20 L
- September 1- Angels Junior team tournament @ Bydgoszcz
  - v. Olsztyn Lakers J 12:22 L
  - v. Bydgoszcz Archers J 31:18 W
- September 7- Metropolitans Toruń-Bydgoszcz (reserve team 2. tournament) @ Sicienko
  - v. Crusaders Warszawa 14:35 L
  - v. Kurpie Ostrołęka 6:30 L
- September 15- Angels Junior team 2. tournament @ Olsztyn
  - v. Bydgoszcz Archers J 36:0 W
  - v. Olsztyn Lakers J 6:24 L
- September 28- Angels Junior team final tournament @ Bielawa
  - v. Bielawa Owls J 0:44 L
  - v. Olsztyn Lakers J 6:18 L
  - v. Patrioci Poznań J 6:28 L
- November 11- Słupsk Angels Junior @ Griffons Słupsk 22:45 W (National Independence Day Cup)

2014

- March 22- Toruń v. Husaria Szczecin 12:16 L (exhibition game)
- March 29- Toruń v. Lowlanders Białystok 8:37 L (exhibition game)
- April 13- Brwinów @ Warsaw BEagles 13:22 W (exhibition game)
- May 3- Słupsk @ Griffons Słupsk 2:36 W
- May 24- Toruń v. Seahawks Sopot 30:27 W
- June 21- Toruń v. Griffons Słupsk 35:0 W
- July 12- Sopot @ Seahawks Sopot 38:6 L
- July 27- Poznań @ Patrioci Poznań 20:32 W
- August 15- Toruń v. Bydgoszcz Archers 33:32
- August 17- Toruń v. Mustangs Płock (junior exhibition game)
- August 30- Toruń v. Warsaw Eagles 20:18 W (junior exhibition game)
- September 6- Angels Junior team tournament Słupsk
  - v. Griffons Słupsk 25:0 W
  - v. Bydgoszcz Archers 32:0 W
- September 20- Warsaw @ Crusaders Warszawa PLFAII quarterfinal
- September 28- Angels Junior team tournament Toruń
  - v. Seahawks Gdynia 36:14 W
  - group A final v. Seahawks Gdynia 38:8 W
- October 5- PLFAII semifinal- Sopot @ Seahawks Sopot 33:18 L
- October 11/12- Angels Junior team final tournament Wrocław
  - quarterfinal v. Gorzów Grizzlies 0:28 L
  - repechage v. Kraków Kings 34:8 W
  - 5. place game v. Bielawa Owls 20:8 W
- December 27- The National Day of Junior Flag Football Warsaw
  - v. Prażmów Pistols 24:0 W
  - v. Szczytno Sixers 8:12 L
  - v. Tytani Lublin 6:6 (tie)

2015

- March 1- Toruń v. Warsaw Sharks 21:38 L (exhibition game)
- March 15- Białystok v. Lowlanders Białystok L (exhibition game)
- March 28- Radom @ Greenducks Radom 22:27 W (exhibition game)
- April 11- Toruń v. Bielawa Owls 20:46 L (junior exhibition game)
- PLFAI
- PLFAJ

== International transfers ==
- Maxwell Germain- 2012 from University of Michigan USA
- Malcolm Garrett- 2012 from LA (London Area) Panthers (Capital League) GBR
- Mathieu Cadoux- 2012 from Frelons de Morlaix (Division Régionale) FRA
- Mathieu Cadoux- 2013 to Aix-en-Provence Argonautes (Casque d'or- Division 2) FRA
- Łukasz Melerski- 2013 to Saarland Hurricanes (GFL) GER
- Bill Moore- 2014 from Wernigerode Mountain Tigers GER

== Honours ==
- "Sports event in 2011 in Torun" according to Gazeta Wyborcza
- CEO Dawid Witnik was nominated to "2012 Toruń Resident of the Year" according to Gazeta Wyborcza
- City Inowrocław Mayor's Cup winner
- Toruń Municipal Sport and Recreation Center Manager's Cup winner
