= Ciechocinek graduation towers =

Complex of brine graduation towers in Poland

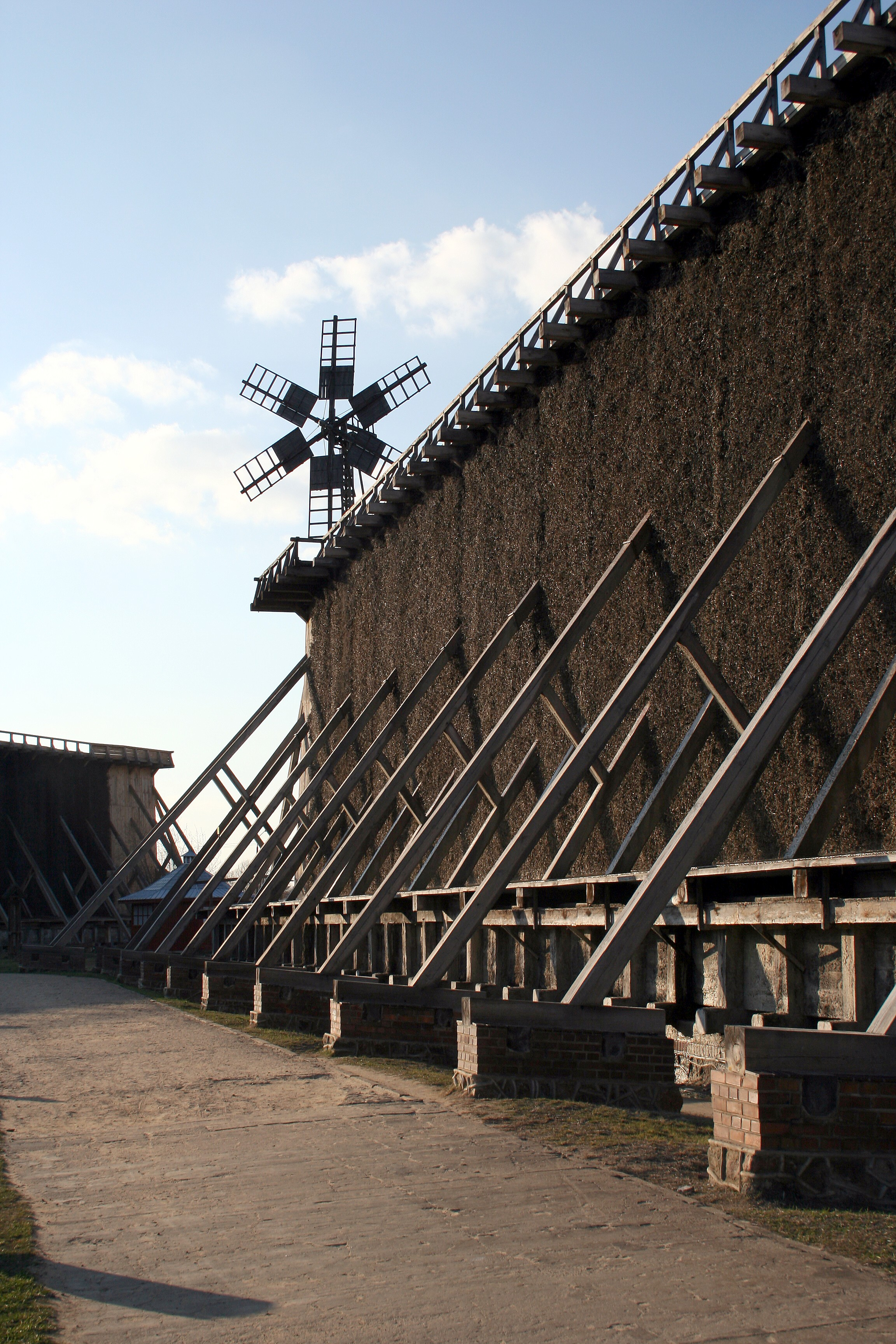
Graduation tower No. III topped with a windmill

The Ciechocinek graduation towers are a complex of three brine graduation towers, erected in the nineteenth century in Ciechocinek, in the Kuyavian-Pomeranian Voivodeship, Poland. They constitute the largest wooden structure of this type in Europe. The complex of graduation towers and salt breweries, together with two surrounding parks, are designated as a Historic Monument.

== History ==
The towers were designed by Jakub Graff, professor of the Mining Academy in Kielce, based on the brine sources discovered here back in the second half of the eighteenth century, although the local community extracted and brewed salt as early as in the thirteenth century under the permissions given by Konrad I Mazowiecki.

The 648-metre-long (2,126 ft) graduation tower I (52°53′09″N 18°47′08″E), with a capacity of 5,000–5,800 cubic metres (180,000–200,000 cu ft) and the 719-metre-long (2,359 ft) graduation tower II (52°53′14″N 18°46′47″E), with a capacity of 6,000–6,300 cubic metres (210,000–220,000 cu ft), were built between 1824 and 1828. The 333-metre-long (1,093 ft) graduation tower III (52°53′23″N 18°46′52″E), with a capacity of 2,900 cubic metres (100,000 cu ft), was built in 1859. The base of the towers is made up of 7000 oak piles driven into the ground, on which a spruce-and-pine structure planted with blackthorn was placed, where brine flows. The towers are arranged in the shape of a horseshoe with a total length of 1,741.5 metres (5,714 ft); each is 15.8 metres (52 ft) high. The brine with a concentration of 5.8% is pumped a depth of 414.58 metres (1,360.2 ft) in spring No. 11 (the so-called Grzybek fountain) into dedicated channels at the top of the graduation towers. The brine seeps on the walls of the towers, on the blackthorn, and evaporates under the influence of wind and sun, creating a microclimate rich in iodine, sodium, chlorine and bromine, thanks to which a natural healing inhalatorium developed.

The towers are the second stage in the salt production process, where the brine concentration is gradually increased. The smallest concentration occurs at tower No. I (9%); the brine concentration increases at tower No. III (16%) and becomes greatest at tower No. II (30%). From the latter, the brine flows in pipelines to the salt-brewing plant (the third stage of salt production) where salt, sludge and therapeutic lye are produced. The first stage in the process of salt production is pumping brine from the source No. 11 "Grzybek fountain". The graduation towers also act as a giant air filter. In 1996, radioactive caesium isotopes (Cs-134 and Cs-137) from the Chernobyl nuclear power plant disaster (1986) were detected in the sludge and salt from the towers; however, their concentration in these products did not pose a threat to human health.

In 2017, the complex of graduation towers and salt breweries, together with the Tężniowy and Zdrojowy parks, was entered on the list of Historic Monuments.

In 2019, the Ciechocinek Health Resort obtained PLN 15 million from European funds for the renovation of the graduation towers (total cost of the project: 21.6 million). The project "Modernization and extension of the infrastructure of the graduation tower complex in Ciechocinek" includes renovation of tower No. I (replacement of blackthorn), tower No. III (general overhaul: replacement of structural elements and reinforcement of foundations) and the brine-pumping-station building, as well as paths and areas near the towers and the pumping station. Gardening work will also be carried out, and an installation to illuminate the towers at night will be constructed. The work, scheduled from March 2020 to December 2021, started with tower No. III.

== Gallery ==
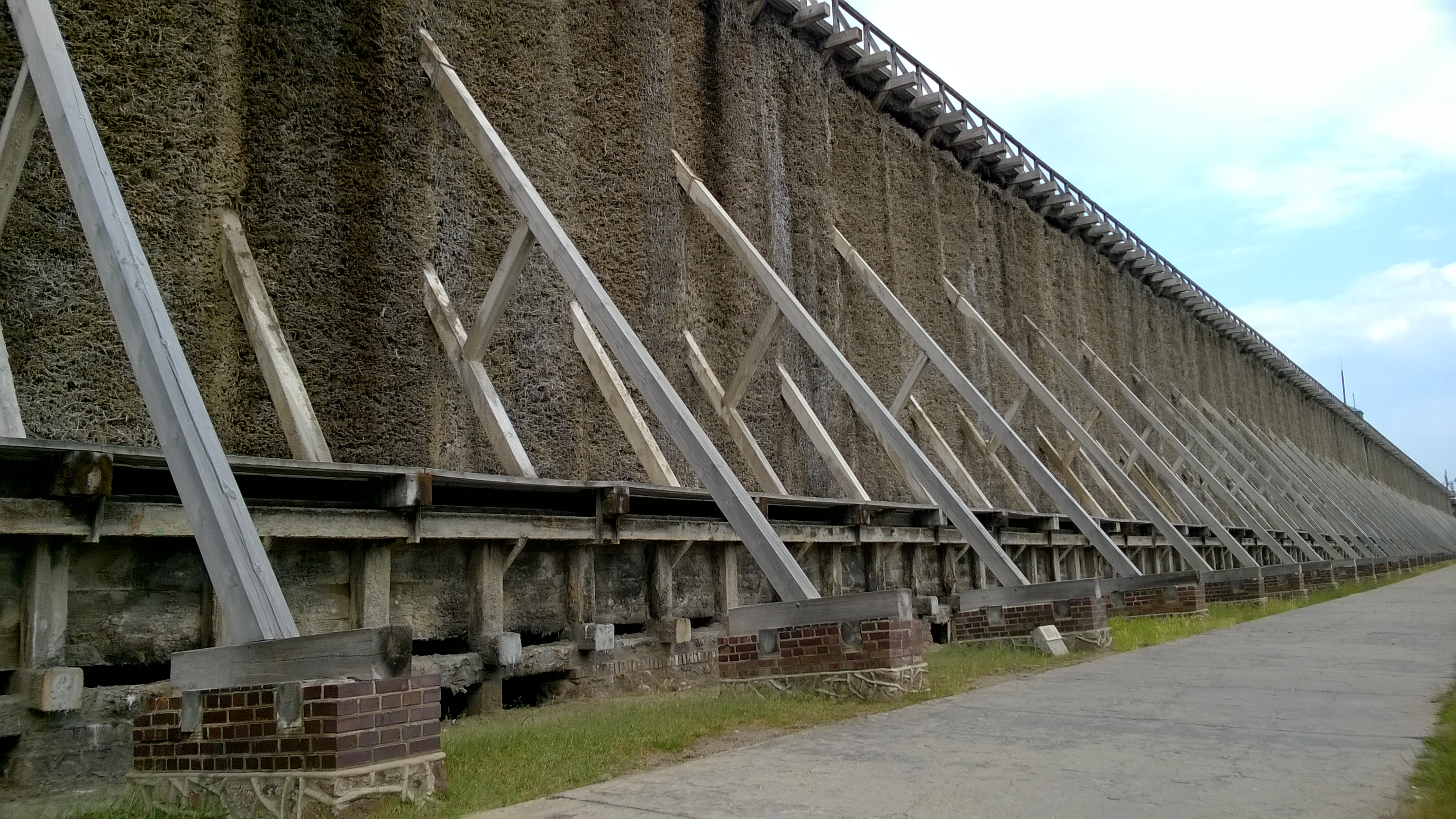
Graduation tower no. 3

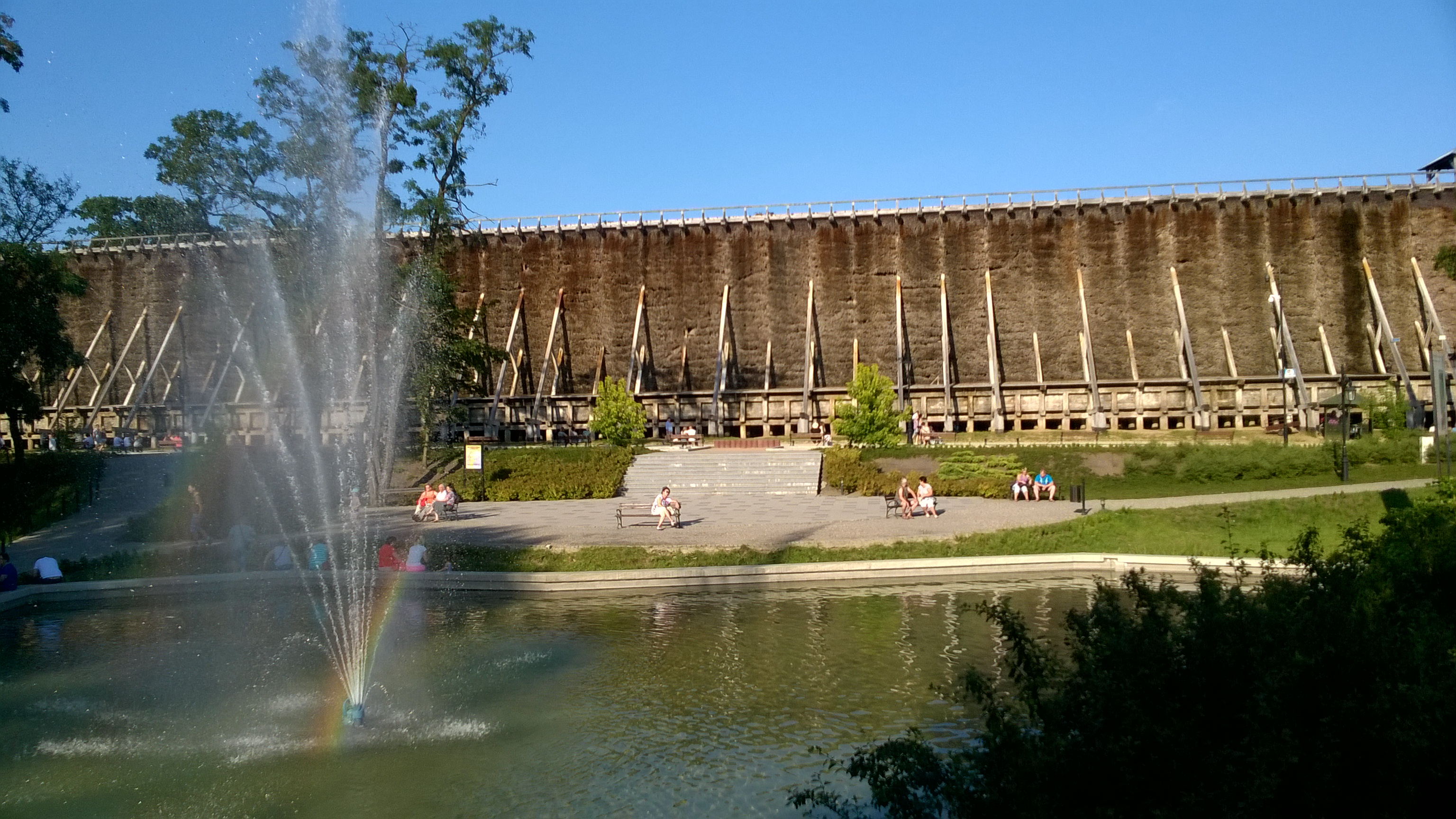
Graduation tower no. 1

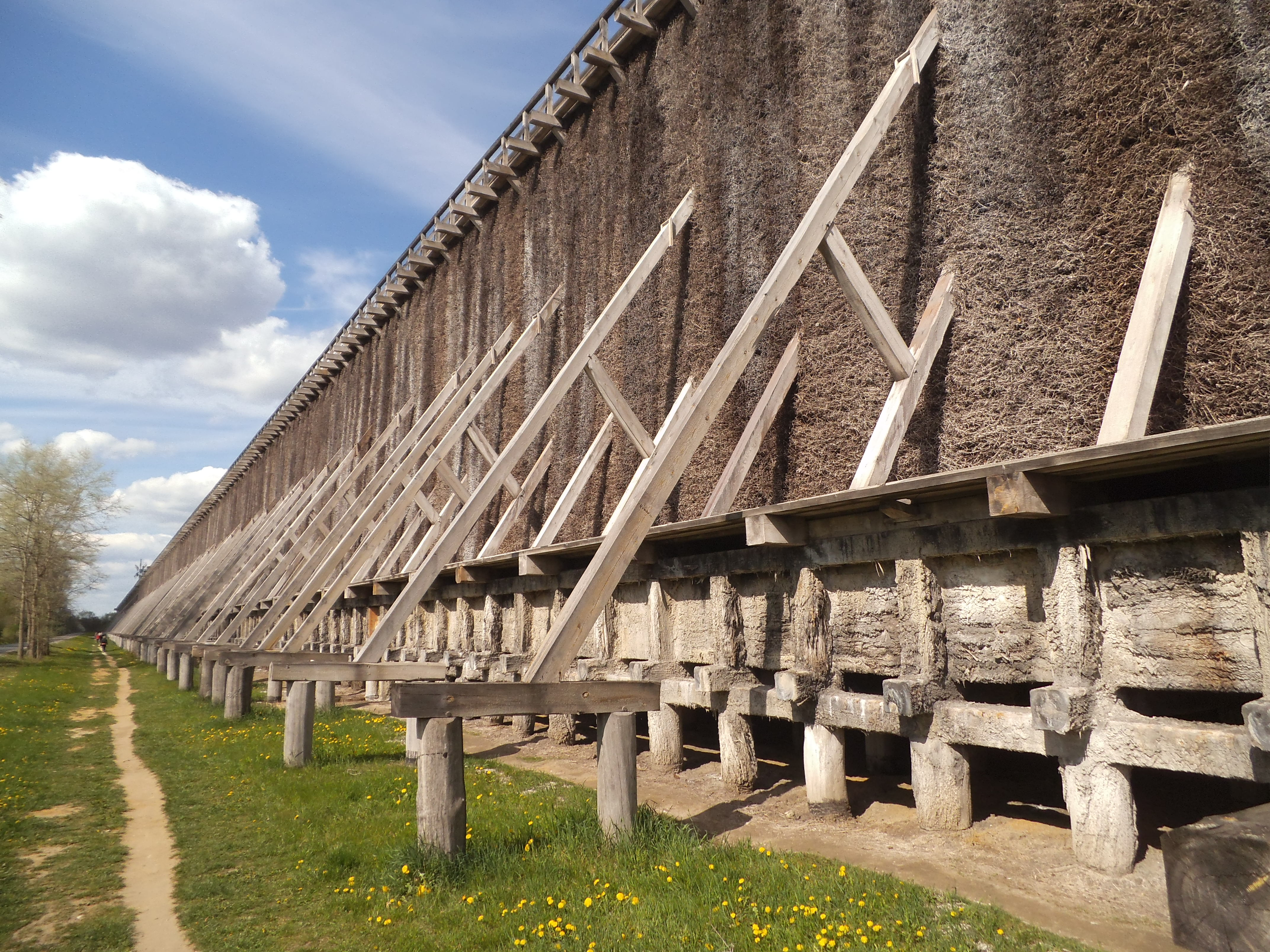
Graduation tower no. 2
