= Star Tenement =

Townhouse in Poland

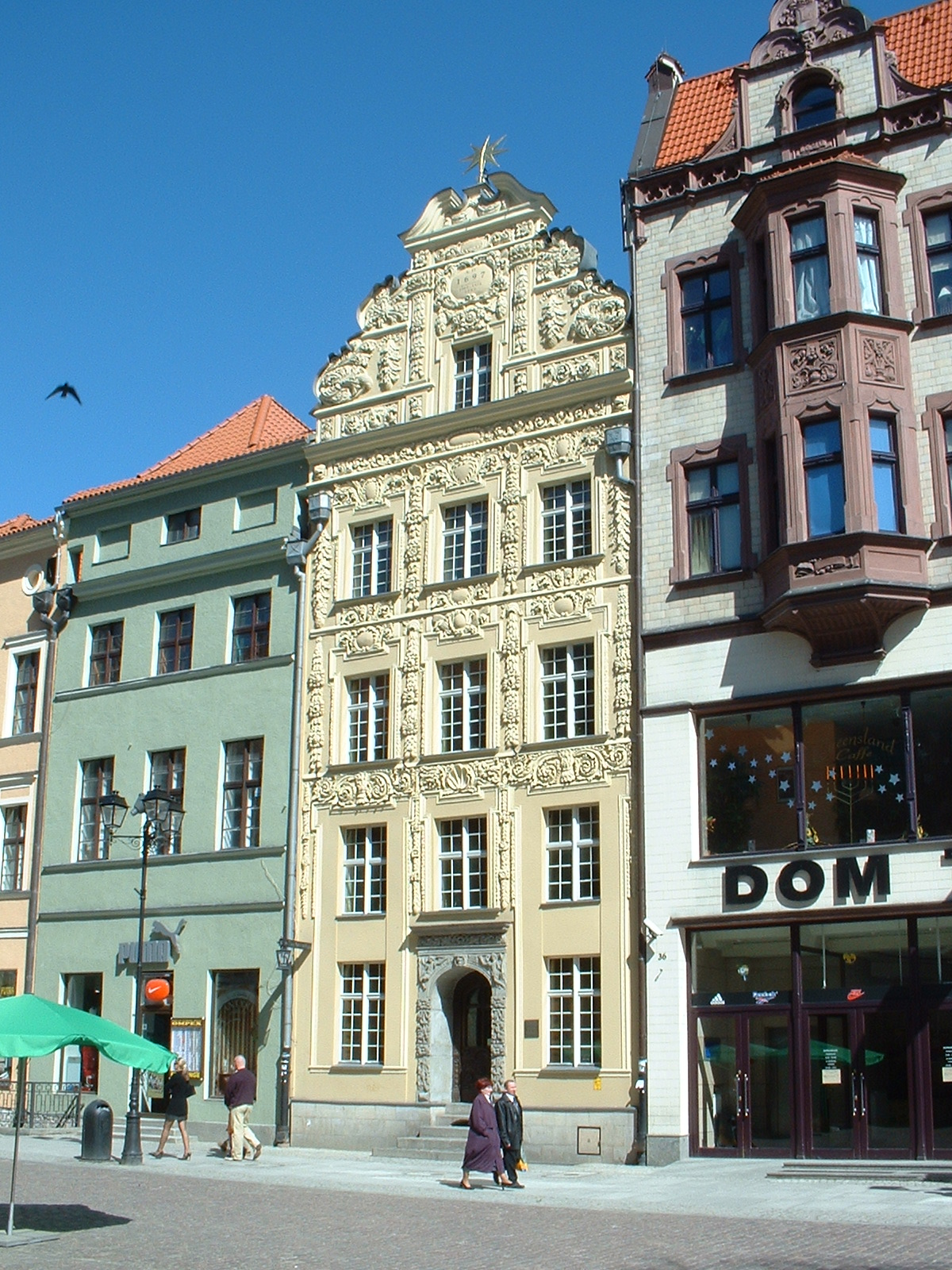
Facade of the building

The Star Tenement (Polish: Kamienica pod Gwiazdą) is a townhouse located in Toruń, Poland. It is distinguished by a late baroque facade, decorated at the top with a golden star, from which its name comes from. Its present shape has been influenced by numerous reconstructions and renovations.

== Location ==
The tenement house is located in the area of the Old Town Complex, on the eastern frontage of the Old Town Square, under number 35.

== History ==
The house was built in the second half of the 13th century. During the Gothic period it was rebuilt several times. One of the owners was the tutor of the sons of Kazimierz Jagiellończyk, poet and humanist Filippo Buonaccorsi (1437-1496), called Kallimach. The next reconstruction was carried out in the second half of the 16th century. At that time, the building was raised to the second floor, obtaining a few-storey spatial layout, characteristic of the bourgeois tenement houses of that time, combining residential, commercial and warehousing functions. The galleries in the middle part of the floors and the polychromed ceiling in the back part of the ground floor were created. The ceiling on the first floor dates back to about 1630-40, whereas the ceiling on the second floor dates back to about 1620 (moved from the tenement house at Rynek Staromiejski 24).

At the end of the 17th century, the new owner, Jan Jerzy Zöbner, an old-town councillor, gave the tenement house a baroque decor. The building received a baroque exterior with a richly decorated portal. The façade was garnished with floral and fruit motifs, made in stucco. There are winding Gdańsk-type stairs in the hallway, guarded by a Minerva figure and a lion holding a shield.

At the beginning of the 19th century, the first floor room was decorated with classicistic polychrome with an illusionist painted colonnade in Ionic order and pseudo-cassettes on the ceiling. Today, thanks to the conservators from Toruń, we can see a reconstruction of said polychrome. In the second half of the 19th century, during the next reconstruction of the house, the second winding staircase - this time cast in iron – replaced the chimney.

Since 1970, the building houses the Museum of Art of the Far East.

== Gallery ==
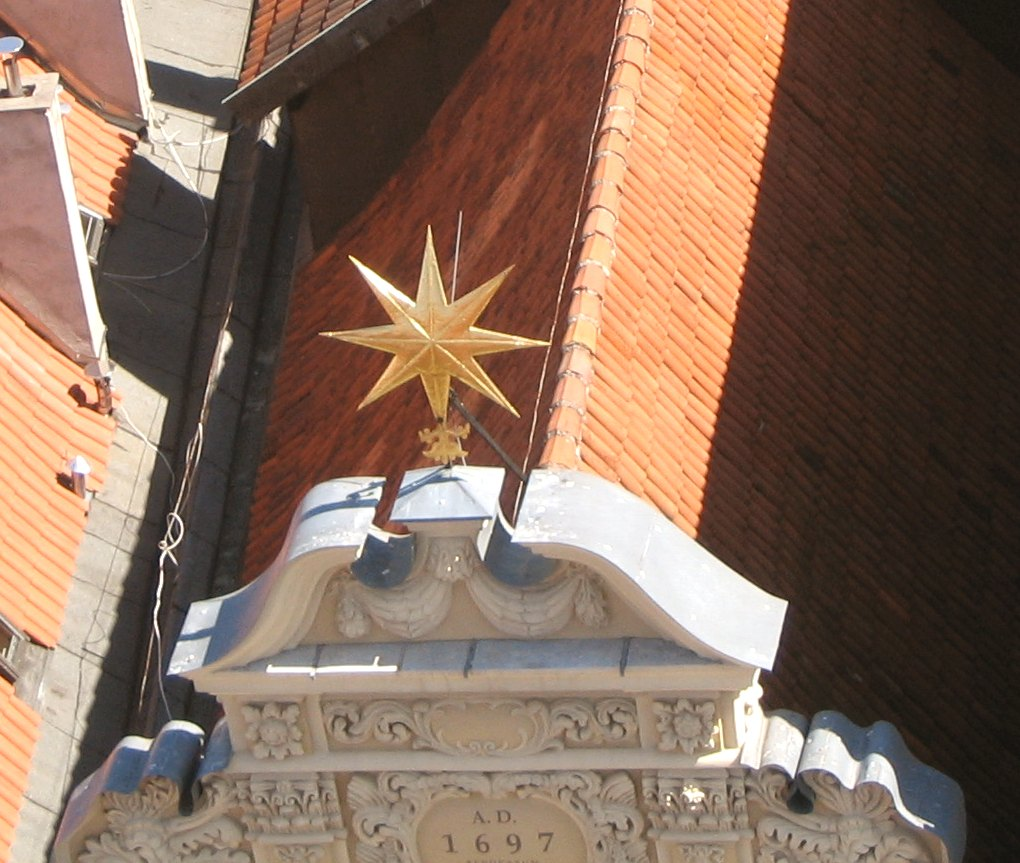
The star on top of the building

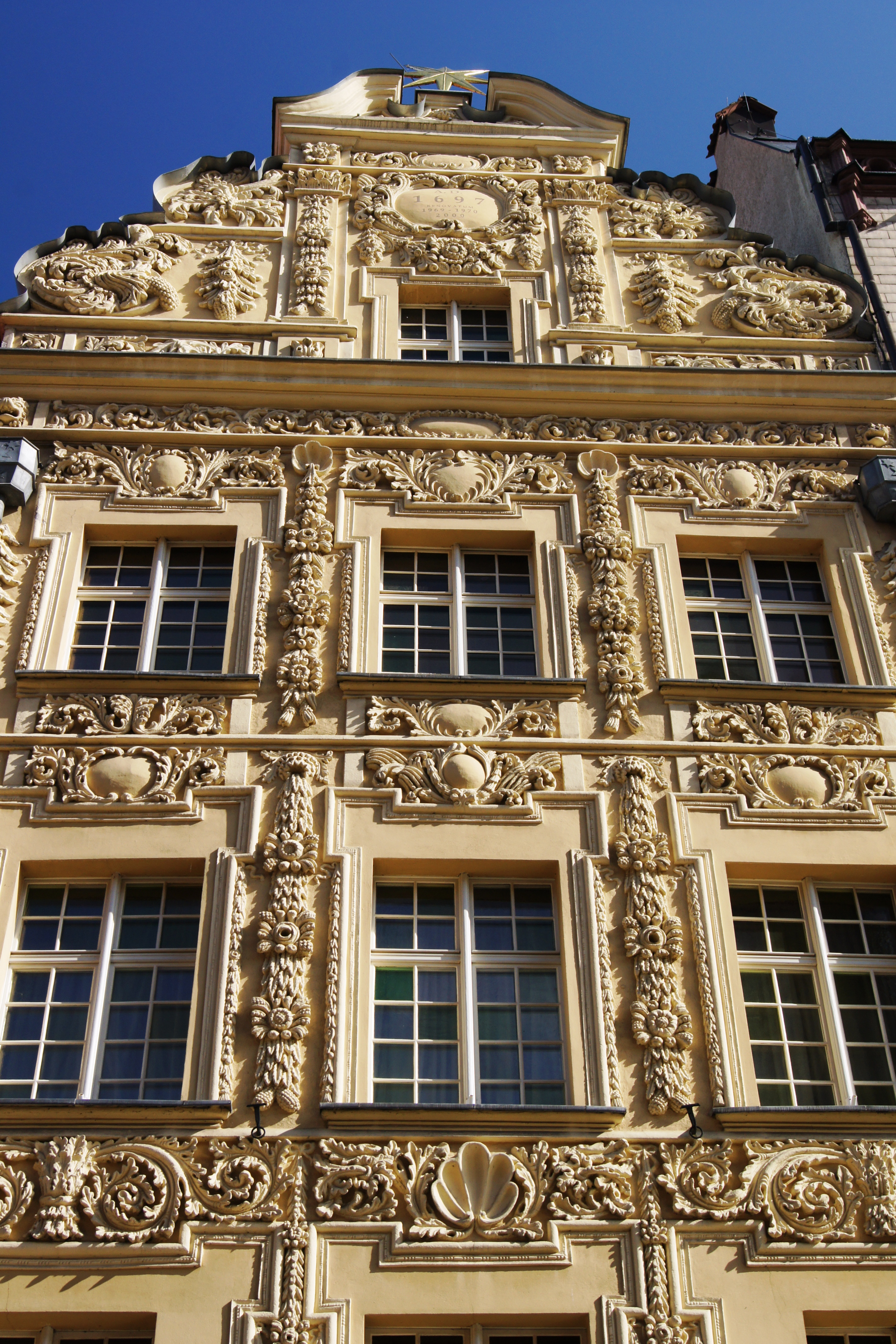
Façade

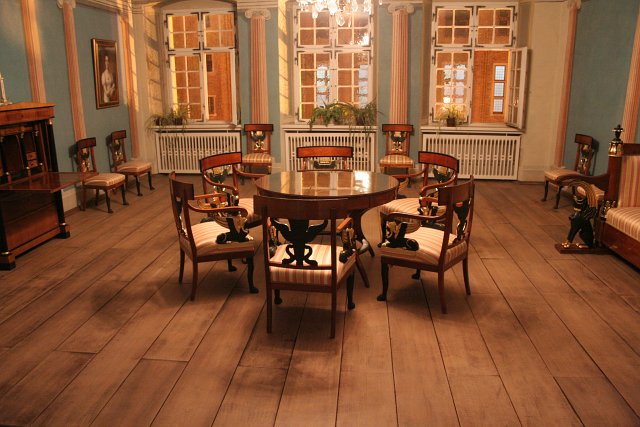
Sitting-room

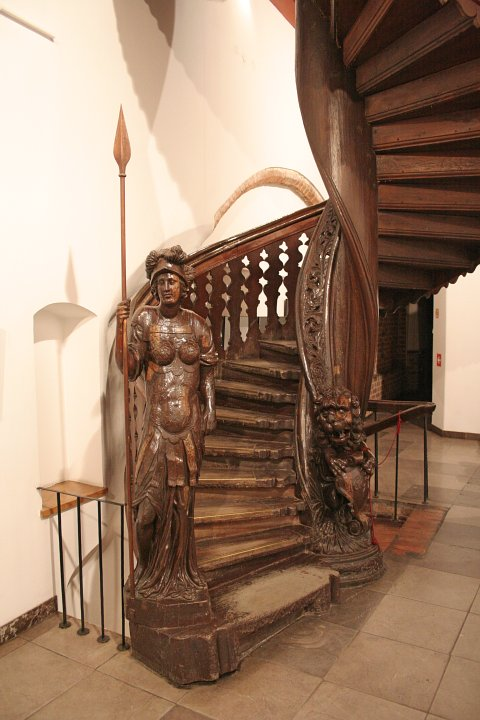
Winding staircase

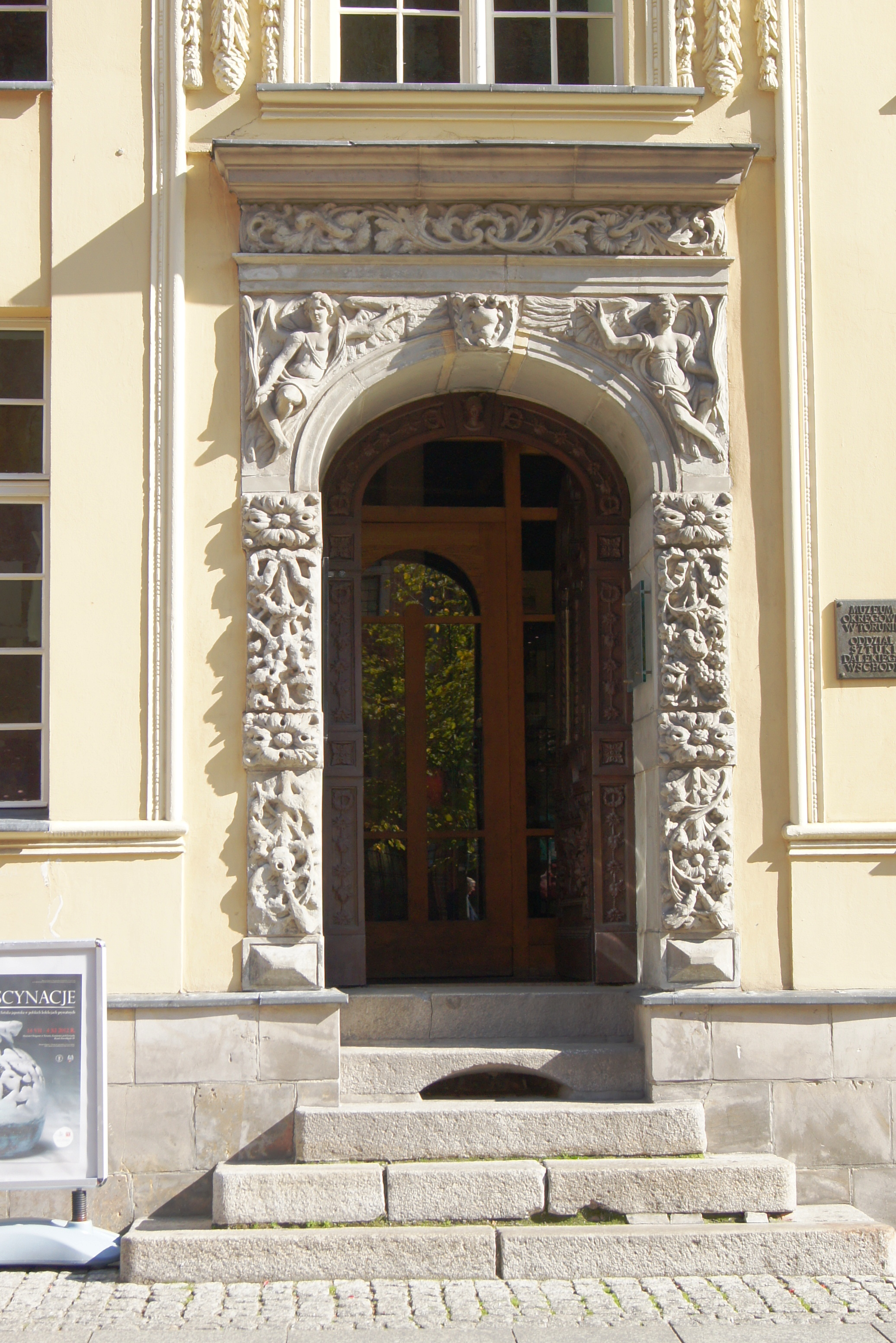
Portal
