= Peace of Thorn =

Peace of Thorn may refer to:

- Peace of Thorn (1411)
- Second Peace of Thorn (1466)
- Compromise of Thorn (1521)
- Treaty of Thorn (1709), the renewal of the Saxo-Russian alliance during the Great Northern War
