= Stadion Miejski im. Grzegorza Duneckiego =

Stadium in Toruń, Poland

- Stadion Miejski im. Grzegorza Duneckiego
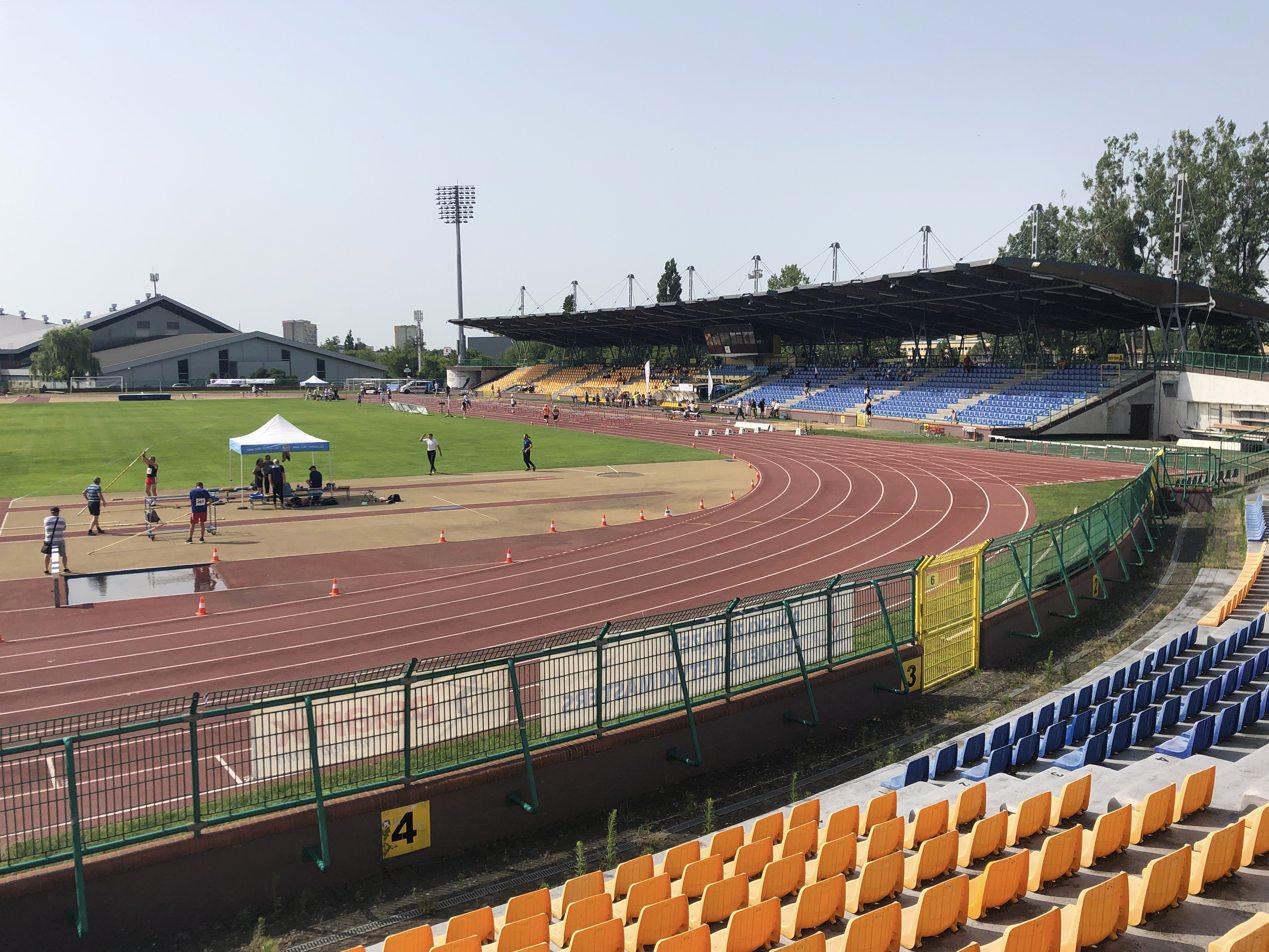
- Interactive map of Stadion Miejski im. Grzegorza Duneckiego
- Address: ul. gen. J. Bema 23/29; Toruń; Poland
- Coordinates: 53.021275°N 18.590497°E
- Owner: City of Toruń
- Operator: MoSiR Toruń
- Type: stadium
- Event: sporting events
- Capacity: 4,275
- Field size: 105 m x 68 m
- Surface: grass (pitch) turf (running track)
- Current use: Football; Athletics

Construction
- Opened: 1961
- Renovated: 1997–2004
- Expanded: 2004
- Rebuilt: 2004

Tenants
- Elana Toruń; Angels Toruń; Polski Związek Lekkiej Atletyki Masters

The Grzegorz Dunecki Municipal Stadium (Polish: Stadion Miejski im. Grzegorza Duneckiego) is an athletics-football stadium, with an adjoining sports complex, in the Chełmińskie Przedmieście district of Toruń, Poland.

It is currently the home of Elana Toruń football club and Polski Związek Lekkiej Atletyki Masters athletics association.

The stadium is equipped with an 8-lane running track lined with a Mondo turf, as well as facilities for shot put, discus and hammer throw. In addition, there are multi-directional tracks for long jump, high jump, pole vault and javelin throw. These facilities are all IAAF certified.

The stadium also has a full-size football pitch licensed by the Polish Football Association. Underneath the grandstand there are changing rooms for the referees and players, as well as a medical room. The stadium has a capacity of 6,000 spectators, of which 4,300 are seated. Next to the stadium there is also a full-size training football pitch with artificial turf and a field hockey pitch.

The stadium is located next to the city's other professional sports facilities, Józef Stogowski Tor-Tor ice rink and Kujawsko-Pomorska Arena Toruń.
