= Bydgoszcz Archers =

- Founded: 2009
- Folded: 2021
- Based in: Bydgoszcz, Poland
- Home field: Stadion KKP Bydgoszcz
- League: Polish Football League
- Colours: Green and Yellow
- Nickname: pl. "Łucznicy"

Championships
- Polish Bowl: 1 (2021)
- Website: bydgoszczarchers.com

The Bydgoszcz Archers were an American football team based in Bydgoszcz, Poland. Founded in 2009, they won the Polish Bowl in 2021 before folding shortly after.

== History ==
The origins of American football in Bydgoszcz back to 2008, when it began to create a team called Bydgoszcz Raiders. In 2009, the team changed his name to Bydgoszcz Archers. The name refers to one of the symbols of Bydgoszcz, sculpture of the Łuczniczka (female archer). In the 2011 season the team took 4th place in the 8-man football competition PLFA 8. Archers qualified for the Final Four, after winning the qualifying tournament in Bydgoszcz and finishing second in the tournament in Olsztyn. After the 2019 season the Archers merged with the team "Herosi Bydgoszcz" and joined the new Liga Futbolu Amerykańskiego.

== Season-by-season records ==
Season	League	Division	Finish	Wins	Losses	Ties	Ref
2011	PLFA 8	North	4th in Final Four	3	3	0	
2012	PLFA 8	North	3rd in Division	1	2	0	
2013	PLFA II	North	5th in Division	2	4	0	
2014	PLFA II	North	3rd in Division	4	2	0	
2015	PLFA II	North	3rd in Division	4	2	0	
2016	PLFA II	North	2nd in Division / promotion	4	2	0	
2017	PLFA I	North	5th in Division	1	7	0	
2018	PLFA 8	North	vice-champion	5	1	0	
2019	PLFA Topliga	–	2nd	5	1	0	
2019	LFA 9	North	4th in Division	1	3	0	
2020	LFA 1	–	semifinal	2	3	0	
2021	PFL 1	–	Champions	6	0	0	
