= 2014 PLFA season =

- League: PLFA
- Sport: American football

Seasons
- ← 2013 2015 →

The 2014 season of the Polish American Football League was the ninth season played by the american football leagues in Poland.

Regular season of the Topliga took place between March 29 and July 6, 2014. The Polish champion was determined in the play-off final - the IX SuperFinal PLFA (known as the Polish Bowl IX). The Seahawks Gdynia beat the Panthers Wrocław in the championship game 41–32 hosted at the Olympic Stadium in Wrocław.

== Topliga ==
=== Results table ===
Team	Week									
Team	1	2	3	4	5	6	7	8	9	10
Panthers Wrocław (PAN)	@SEA 30-22	@STE 0-27	SHA 82-0	KOZ 45-7	EAG 16-17	STE 54-7	@EAG 4-37	SEA 23-14	@KOZ 0-56	@SHA 0-38
Kozły Poznań (KOZ)	SHA 45-0	@SEA 36-28	STE 24-18	@PAN 45-7	SEA 26-54	EAG 0-31	@SHA 22-27	@EAG 28-0	@STE 0-28	PAN 0-56
Warsaw Eagles (EAG)	STE 47-0	@SHA 6-45	SEA 7-27	@STE 14-21	@PAN 16-17	@KOZ 0-31	PAN 4-37	KOZ 28-0	SHA 47-6	@SEA 21-30
Zagłębie Steelers (STE)	@SHA 14-30	@EAG 47-0	PAN 0-27	@KOZ 24-18	EAG 14-21	SHA 27-16	@PAN 54-7	SEA 14-27	@SEA 62-27	KOZ 0-28
Seahawks Gdynia (SEA)	PAN 30-22	KOZ 36-28	@EAG 7-27	@SHA 20-51	@KOZ 26-54	SHA 49-16	@STE 14-27	STE 62-27	@PAN 23-14	EAG 21-30
Warsaw Sharks (SHA)	STE 14-30	@KOZ 45-0	EAG 6-45	@PAN 82-0	SEA 20-51	@STE 27-16	@SEA 49-16	KOZ 22-27	@EAG 47-6	PAN 0-38

=== Standings ===
Team	W	L	PTS	PCT	PF	PA	PD
Panthers Wrocław	8	2	16	.800	400	79	+321
Seahawks Gdynia	8	2	16	.800	371	213	+158
Warsaw Eagles	8	2	16	.800	277	127	+150
Kozły Poznań	4	6	8	.400	185	290	-105
Zagłębie Steelers	2	8	4	.200	137	320	-183
Warsaw Sharks	0	10	0	.000	100	441	-341

=== Postseason ===
Semi-finals
1	Panthers Wrocław	32
4	Kozły Poznań	0
2	Seahawks Gdynia	31
3	Warsaw Eagles	28

IX SuperFinał PLFA
1	Panthers Wrocław	31
2	Seahawks Gdynia	41

== PLFA I ==
=== Standings ===
Eastern Group
Team	W	L	PTS	PCT	PF	PA
Lowlanders Białystok	8	0	16	1.000	314	42
Kraków Kings	4	4	8	.500	160	193
Tytani Lublin	3	5	6	.375	161	163
Wilki Łódzkie	3	5	6	.375	143	222
Mustangs Płock	2	6	4	.250	62	220

Western Group
Team	W	L	PTS	PCT	PF	PA
Husaria Szczecin	8	0	16	1.000	332	97
Tychy Falcons	5	3	10	.625	156	146
Cougars Szczecin	5	3	19	.625	140	170
Gliwice Lions	2	6	4	.250	102	190
Bielawa Owls	0	8	0	.000	72	199

=== Postseason ===
Semi-finals
E1	Lowlanders Białystok	49
W2	Tychy Falcons	6
W1	Husaria Szczecin	46
E2	Kraków Kings	8

PLFA Cup Game I
E1	Lowlanders Białystok	26
W1	Husaria Szczecin	27

== See also ==
- 2014 in sports
