= 2022 European League of Football season =

2022 ELF season
- League: European League of Football
- Sport: American football
- Duration: June 4 – September 25
- Games: 72 + 3 playoff games
- Teams: 12
- Total attendance: 249,015
- Season MVP: Sean Shelton (Raiders Tirol)

Conference Champions
- Northern Conference champions: (Germany) Hamburg Sea Devils
- Central Conference champions: (Austria) Vienna Vikings
- Southern Conference champions: (Spain) Barcelona Dragons

2022 Championship Game
- Date: September 25, 2022
- Venue: Wörthersee Stadion, Klagenfurt
- Champions: (Austria) Vienna Vikings (1st title)
- Finals MVP: Kimi Linnainmaa (Vienna Vikings)

Seasons
- 2021 2023

The 2022 ELF season was the second season of the European League of Football, a semi professional American football league based in Europe. Twelve teams from five countries participated. The 2022 season started on June 4, 2022, and concluded with the ELF Championship Game on September 25, 2022, at the Wörthersee Stadion, Klagenfurt. In their first year in the league, Vienna Vikings won the title, beating 2021 runners-up Hamburg Sea Devils 27–15.

== Format ==
The league is divided into three conferences, North, Central and South. Each team plays 12 games during the regular season: twice against their conference rivals, and twice against three of the teams from the other conferences. The top team in each conference, as well as the best second-place team, qualify for the playoffs.

== Teams ==
Location of ELF teams
- Northern Conference
- Central Conference
- Southern Conference

On top of the eight inaugural season teams, the league expanded with four new franchises. On September 25, 2021, the Vienna Vikings, Raiders Tirol as well as Rhein Fire were officially introduced as new teams. On October 15, 2021, the addition of the Istanbul Rams was announced. First, the Rams home field was the Yusuf Ziya Öniş Stadium but was later changed.

Team	City	Conference	Stadium	Capacity	Head coach
Barcelona Dragons	(Spain) Barcelona/Reus	Southern	Estadi Municipal de Reus	4,700	(United States) Andrew Weidinger
Berlin Thunder	(Germany) Berlin	Northern	Friedrich-Ludwig-Jahn-Sportpark	19,708	(Germany) Johnny Schmuck
Cologne Centurions	(Germany) Cologne	Southern	Südstadion	11,748	(Germany) Frank Roser
Frankfurt Galaxy	(Germany) Frankfurt am Main	Central	PSD Bank Arena	12,542	(Germany) Thomas Kösling
Hamburg Sea Devils	(Germany) Hamburg	Northern	Stadion Hoheluft	8,000	(United States) Charles "Yogi" Jones
Istanbul Rams	(Turkey) Istanbul	Southern	Maltepe Hasan Polat Stadium	5,000	(United States) Matt Lawson
Leipzig Kings	(Germany) Dessau-Roßlau	Northern	Paul Greifzu Stadium (Note: First home game of the season)	20,000	(United States) Fred Armstrong
Leipzig Kings	(Germany) Halle (Saale)	Northern	Leuna Chemie Stadion (Note: Second home game of the season)	15,057	(United States) Fred Armstrong
Leipzig Kings	(Germany) Leipzig	Northern	Bruno-Plache-Stadion (Note: Four home games starting in July)	12,321	(United States) Fred Armstrong
Panthers Wrocław	(Poland) Wrocław	Northern	Stadion Olimpijski	11,000	(Poland) Jakub Samel
Raiders Tirol	(Austria) Innsbruck	Central	Tivoli Stadion Tirol	16,008	Kevin Herron
Rhein Fire	(Germany) Düsseldorf/Duisburg	Southern	Schauinsland-Reisen-Arena	31,514	(United States) Jim Tomsula
Stuttgart Surge	(Germany) Stuttgart	Central	Gazi-Stadion auf der Waldau	11,408	(Germany) Martin Hanselmann
Vienna Vikings	(Austria) Vienna	Central	Generali Arena	17,500	(United States) Chris Calaycay

=== Rosters ===
Like last season, there is a limit of 4 US American, Canadian, Mexican or Japanese players per roster, and two on the field at the same time, but people who are dual citizens of the U.S. and an EU-member country are not counted towards that limit in keeping with the Bosman ruling. There is also a limit of 8 non-American foreigners per roster. Brazilian players do not count towards the import quota. The overall roster limit is 55 active Players and 5 spots on the practice squad.

==== Roster moves ====
In the 2022 preseason, several ELF players were picked up by other professional leagues, including 2021 season MVP Madre London. ELF contracts allow for premature termination in case professional North American leagues want to sign these players.

- NFL IPP Program: Marcel Dabo (Stuttgart Surge), Adedayo Odeleye (Berlin Thunder)
- Canadian Football League: Keanu Ebanks (Panthers Wrocław), Seantavius Jones (Berlin Thunder), Anthony Mahoungou (Frankfurt Galaxy)
- United States Football League: Madre London (Cologne Centurions), Kolin Hill (Berlin Thunder), Dartez Jacobs (Raiders Tirol), Diondre Overton (Vienna Vikings), KaVontae Turpin (Panthers Wrocław), Dale Warren (Stuttgart Surge)

=== Player representation ===
After players complained of subpar housing conditions for "import" players of the Frankfurt Galaxy franchise, an unofficial union, based in Switzerland was formed under the name of European League of Football Players Association (ELFPA). Representatives of this union are not public and concrete measures haven't been taken so far.

In order to represent active players of the ELF, the league announced the Players Committee for the 2022 season. It consists of two players of each franchise and can hold regular meetings. Out of this committee two spokespersons are elected which are in contact with the commissioner and the Competition Committee of the league.

== Rule changes ==
After the inaugural season, in which the ELF mostly used modified NFL rules (with the exception of the overtime rule, which was based on that of college football – but never used during the entire season as no overtime needed to be played), the league announced its first rule change for the second season. The kick-off rule has been modified to increase player safety, and has been taken from the second iteration of the XFL. According to the new rule, teams will now face each other 5 yards apart, and can only start moving after the returner catches the kickoff, or 3 seconds after the ball hits the ground.

After making its ELF debut in the 2021 championship game, Instant Replay will be used for the entirety of the 2022 season. Like in the NFL, every coach has two challenges per game, with the possibility of a third if both of the challenges are successful.

All teams are not allowed to start organised team activities before May 1, 2022, with import players and padded training. The league set this rule to ensure competitive balance, in which teams with more funds can pay their import players earlier. Strength and conditioning sessions and individual training are not affected by this rule.

== Regular season ==
=== Schedule ===
The schedule for the 2022 season was released on February 14, 2022. For international matches of the IFAF the league has agreed to plan for a break.

==== Week 1 ====
Week 1
Date/Time (CEST)	Conf.	Away team	Result	Home team	Venue	Attendance	Free TV	Viewers	Ref
Sat, 4. June; 17:00	Southern	Istanbul Rams	38 – 40	Cologne Centurions	Südstadion	2,250	ran.de, S Sport, Arena4+, Eleven Sport		
Sun, 5. June; 15:00	IC	Rhein Fire	29 – 26	Frankfurt Galaxy	PSD Bank Arena	7,525	ProSieben MAXX, Arena4+, Eleven Sport	140.000 (3.6% ProSieben MAXX)	
Sun, 5. June; 15:00	IC	Barcelona Dragons	38 – 9	Stuttgart Surge	Gazi-Stadion auf der Waldau	2,690	Esport3, Eleven Sport		
Sun, 5. June; 15:00	Northern	Leipzig Kings	27 – 34	Panthers Wrocław	Stadion Olimpijski	3,150	Polsat Sport, Eleven Sport		
Sun, 5. June; 15:00	Northern	Berlin Thunder	18 – 43	Hamburg Sea Devils	Stadion Hoheluft	4,936	Eleven Sport		
Sun, 5. June; 15:00	Central	Vienna Vikings	29 – 23	Raiders Tirol	Tivoli Stadion Tirol	3,750	Puls24, Eleven Sport		

==== Week 2 ====
Week 2
Date/Time (CEST)	Conf.	Away team	Result	Home team	Venue	Attendance	Free TV	Viewers	Ref
Sat, 11. June; 15:00	IC	Raiders Tirol	46 – 49	Cologne Centurions	Südstadion	1,537	Eleven Sports		
Sat, 11. June; 15:00	IC	Istanbul Rams	7 – 41	Berlin Thunder	Friedrich-Ludwig-Jahn-Sportpark	3,404	S Sport, MoreThanSportTV, ran.de, Eleven Sports		
Sun, 12. June; 15:00	IC	Rhein Fire	28 – 17	Leipzig Kings	Paul Greifzu Stadium	2,250	Eleven Sports		
Sun, 12. June; 15:00	IC	Panthers Wrocław	28 – 25	Stuttgart Surge	Gazi-Stadion auf der Waldau	2,100	Polsat Sport, Eleven Sports		
Sun, 12. June; 15:00	IC	Barcelona Dragons	24 – 21	Hamburg Sea Devils	Stadion Hoheluft	3,447	Esport3, Eleven Sports, ProSieben MAXX, ran.de	130.000 (3,6% ProSieben MAXX)	
Sun, 12. June; 15:00	Central	Frankfurt Galaxy	10 – 30	Vienna Vikings	Generali Arena Vienna	3,913	Puls24, Zappn.tv, Eleven Sports		

==== Week 3 ====
Week 3
Date/Time (CEST)	Conf.	Away team	Result	Home team	Venue	Attendance	Free TV	Viewers	Ref
Sat, 18. June; 18:00	Northern	Hamburg Sea Devils	14 – 0	Leipzig Kings	Leuna Chemie Stadion	2,400	ran.de, Arena4+		
Sat, 18. June; 18:00	Southern	Cologne Centurions	32 – 34	Barcelona Dragons	Estadi Municipal de Reus	980	Esport3		
Sun, 19. June; 15:00	Southern	Istanbul Rams	12 – 42	Rhein Fire	Schauinsland-Reisen-Arena	7,895	ran.de, ProSieben MAXX, S Sport, Arena4+	400.000 (4,2% ProSieben MAXX)	
Sun, 19. June; 15:00	Central	Stuttgart Surge	13 – 42	Vienna Vikings	Generali Arena Vienna	2,400	Zappn.tv		
Sun, 19. June; 15:00	IC	Panthers Wrocław	13 – 47	Frankfurt Galaxy	PSD Bank Arena	3,025	Polsat Sport		
Sun, 19. June; 15:00	IC	Berlin Thunder	16 – 28	Raiders Tirol	Tivoli Stadion Tirol	3,032	Zappn.tv, Puls24		

==== Week 4 ====
Week 4
Date/Time (CEST)	Conf.	Away team	Result	Home team	Venue	Attendance	Free TV	Viewers	Ref
Sat, 25. June; 15:00	IC	Vienna Vikings	49 – 0	Istanbul Rams	Maltepe Hasan Polat Stadium	800	Zappn.tv, S Sport		
17:00	IC	Frankfurt Galaxy	48 – 12	Cologne Centurions	Südstadion	2,530	ran.de		
Sun, 26. June; 15:00	Northern	Hamburg Sea Devils	26 – 23 (OT)	Panthers Wrocław	Stadion Olimpijski	2,450	Polsat Sport		
Sun, 26. June; 15:00	Northern	Leipzig Kings	19 – 15	Berlin Thunder	Friedrich-Ludwig-Jahn-Sportpark	3,134	ProSieben MAXX, ran.de		
Sun, 26. June; 15:00	Central	Raiders Tirol	33 – 0	Stuttgart Surge	Gazi-Stadion auf der Waldau	1,400	Puls24, Zappn.tv		
Sun, 26. June; 15:00	Southern	Barcelona Dragons	17 – 13	Rhein Fire	Schauinsland-Reisen-Arena	7,583	Esport3		

==== Week 5 ====
Week 5
Date/Time (CEST)	Conf.	Away team	Result	Home team	Venue	Attendance	Free TV	Viewers	Ref
Sat, 2. July; 18:00	Southern	Istanbul Rams	7 – 41	Barcelona Dragons	Estadi Municipal de Reus	957	Esport3, S Sport		
15:00	IC	Berlin Thunder	34 – 7	Cologne Centurions	Südstadion	1,580	ran.de		
Sun, 3. July; 15:00	IC	Rhein Fire	15 – 42	Hamburg Sea Devils	Stadion Hoheluft	4,128	ProSieben MAXX		
Sun, 3. July; 15:00	IC	Panthers Wrocław	6 – 30	Vienna Vikings	Generali Arena Vienna	3,725	Puls24, Polsat Sport		
Sun, 3. July; 15:00	IC	Stuttgart Surge	22 – 28	Leipzig Kings	Bruno-Plache-Stadion	2,950			
Sun, 3. July; 15:00	Central	Frankfurt Galaxy	17 – 23	Raiders Tirol	Tivoli Stadion Tirol	4,686	Puls24		

==== Week 6 ====
Week 6
Date/Time (CEST)	Conf.	Away team	Result	Home team	Venue	Attendance	Free TV	Viewers	Ref
Sat, 9. July; 15:00	IC	Hamburg Sea Devils	70 – 0	Istanbul Rams	Maltepe Hasan Polat Stadium	300	S Sport, ran.de		
18:00	IC	Vienna Vikings	27 – 20	Barcelona Dragons	Estadi Municipal de Reus	1,312	Esport3, Zappn.tv		
Sun, 10. July; 15:00	IC	Leipzig Kings	6 – 37	Raiders Tirol	Tivoli Stadion Tirol	3,376	Puls 24, Zappn.tv		
Sun, 10. July; 15:00	Northern	Panthers Wrocław	25 – 31 (OT)	Berlin Thunder	Friedrich-Ludwig-Jahn-Sportpark	3,056	Polsat Sport, ran.de, ProSieben MAXX		
Sun, 10. July; 15:00	Central	Frankfurt Galaxy	26 – 20 (OT)	Stuttgart Surge	Gazi-Stadion auf der Waldau	2,514			
Sun, 10. July; 15:00	Southern	Cologne Centurions	3 – 17	Rhein Fire	Schauinsland-Reisen-Arena	9,496			

==== Week 7 ====
Week 7
Date/Time (CEST)	Conf.	Away team	Result	Home team	Venue	Attendance	Free TV	Viewers	Ref
Sun, 17. July; 15:00	Northern	Berlin Thunder	33 – 22	Leipzig Kings	Bruno-Plache-Stadion	3,000	ran.de		
Sun, 17. July; 15:00	IC	Cologne Centurions	14 – 46	Frankfurt Galaxy	PSD Bank Arena	4,500	ProSieben Maxx, Arena4+		
Sun, 17. July; 15:00	IC	Stuttgart Surge	0 – 34	Panthers Wrocław	Stadion Olimpijski	2,050	Polsat Sport		
Bye		Barcelona Dragons, Hamburg Sea Devils, Istanbul Rams, Raiders Tirol, Rhein Fire, Vienna Vikings							

==== Week 8 ====
Week 8
Date/Time (CEST)	Conf.	Away team	Result	Home team	Venue	Attendance	Free TV	Viewers	Ref
Sat, 23. July; 15:00	Southern	Barcelona Dragons	19 – 22	Istanbul Rams	Maltepe Hasan Polat Stadium	400	S Sport, Esport3		
Sun, 24. July; 15:00	IC	Hamburg Sea Devils	40 – 16	Rhein Fire	Schauinsland-Reisen-Arena	7,792	ProSieben MAXX, ran.de		
Sun, 24. July; 15:00	Central	Raiders Tirol	13 – 29	Vienna Vikings	Generali Arena Vienna	4,523	Puls24, Zappn.tv		
Bye		Berlin Thunder, Cologne Centurions, Frankfurt Galaxy, Leipzig Kings, Panthers Wrocław, Stuttgart Surge							

==== Week 9 ====
Week 9
Date/Time (CEST)	Conf.	Away team	Result	Home team	Venue	Attendance	Free TV	Viewers	Ref
Sat, 30. July; 18:00	Southern	Rhein Fire	23 – 33	Barcelona Dragons	Estadi Municipal de Reus	1,043	Esport3, ran.de		
Sun, 31. July; 15:00	Central	Vienna Vikings	41 – 0	Stuttgart Surge	Gazi-Stadion auf der Waldau	2,000	Zappn.tv		
Sun, 31. July; 15:00	IC	Frankfurt Galaxy	30 – 29	Panthers Wrocław	Stadion Olimpijski	1,715	Polsat Sport		
Sun, 31. July; 15:00	IC	Istanbul Rams	26 – 29 (OT)	Hamburg Sea Devils	Stadion Hoheluft	3,170	S Sport		
Sun, 31. July; 15:00	IC	Raiders Tirol	56 – 14	Leipzig Kings	Bruno-Plache-Stadion	2,500	Puls24, Zappn.tv		
Sun, 31. July; 15:00	IC	Cologne Centurions	29 – 39	Berlin Thunder	Friedrich-Ludwig-Jahn-Sportpark	3,364	ProSieben MAXX	60.000 (1,6% ProSieben MAXX)	

==== Week 10 ====
Week 10
6./7. August	All teams on bye

==== Week 11 ====
Week 11
Date/Time (CEST)	Conf.	Away team	Result	Home team	Venue	Attendance	Free TV	Viewers	Ref
Sat, 13. August; 17:00	Southern	Barcelona Dragons	37 – 15	Cologne Centurions	Südstadion	820	Esport3, ran.de		
15:00	Southern	Rhein Fire	50 – 32	Istanbul Rams	Maltepe Hasan Polat Stadium	360	S Sport		
Sun, 14. August; 13:00	Northern	Leipzig Kings	0 – 59	Hamburg Sea Devils	Stadion Hoheluft	2,636			
15:00	Northern	Berlin Thunder	29 – 12	Panthers Wrocław	Stadion Olimpijski	1,800	Polsat Sport		
15:00	Central	Vienna Vikings	8 – 42	Frankfurt Galaxy	PSD Bank Arena	4,600	Zappn.tv, ran.de ProSieben MAXX		
15:00	Central	Stuttgart Surge	3 – 44	Raiders Tirol	Tivoli Stadion Tirol	3,415	Zappn.tv		

==== Week 12 ====
Week 12
Date/Time (CEST)	Conf.	Away team	Result	Home team	Venue	Attendance	Free TV	Viewers	Ref
Sat, 20. August; 18:00	IC	Stuttgart Surge	8 – 62	Barcelona Dragons	Estadi Municipal de Reus	897	Esport3, ran.de, Arena4+		
Sun, 21. August; 15:00	IC	Frankfurt Galaxy	21 – 23	Rhein Fire	Schauinsland-Reisen-Arena	12,055	ProSieben MAXX, ran.de		
Sun, 21. August; 15:00	IC	Istanbul Rams	22 – 37	Vienna Vikings	Generali Arena Vienna	2,028	Zappn.tv, S Sport		
Sun, 21. August; 15:00	IC	Cologne Centurions	20 – 45	Raiders Tirol	Tivoli Stadion Tirol	3,891	Zappn.tv		
Sun, 21. August; 15:00	Northern	Hamburg Sea Devils	39 – 17	Berlin Thunder	Friedrich-Ludwig-Jahn-Sportpark	4,624			
Sun, 21. August; 15:00	Northern	Panthers Wrocław	41 – 37	Leipzig Kings	Bruno-Plache-Stadion	2,500	Polsat Sport		

==== Week 13 ====
Week 13
Date/Time (CEST)	Conf.	Away team	Result	Home team	Venue	Attendance	Free TV	Viewers	Ref
Sat, 27. August; 17:00	Southern	Rhein Fire	59 – 37	Cologne Centurions	Südstadion	2,341	ran.de		
15:00	IC	Berlin Thunder	38 – 14	Istanbul Rams	Maltepe Hasan Polat Stadium	300	S Sport		
Sun, 28. August; 15:00	IC	Barcelona Dragons	18 – 24	Vienna Vikings	Generali Arena Vienna	4,104	Zappn.tv, Esport3		
Sun, 28. August; 15:00	IC	Leipzig Kings	38 – 0	Stuttgart Surge	Gazi-Stadion auf der Waldau	1,800			
Sun, 28. August; 15:00	Central	Raiders Tirol	33 – 36	Frankfurt Galaxy	PSD Bank Arena	6,100	ProSieben MAXX, ran.de Zappn.tv		
Sun, 28. August; 15:00	Northern	Panthers Wrocław	0 – 17	Hamburg Sea Devils	Stadion Hoheluft	3,167	Polsat Sport		

==== Week 14 ====
Week 14
Date/Time (CEST)	Conf.	Away team	Result	Home team	Venue	Attendance	Free TV	Viewers	Ref
Sat, 3. September; 15:00	Southern	Cologne Centurions	43 – 30	Istanbul Rams	Maltepe Hasan Polat Stadium	450	S Sport		
18:00	IC	Hamburg Sea Devils	24 – 21	Barcelona Dragons	Estadi Municipal de Reus	963	Esport3, ran.de		
Sun, 4. September; 15:00	IC	Raiders Tirol	37 – 10	Berlin Thunder	Friedrich-Ludwig-Jahn-Sportpark	3,916	ProSieben MAXX, ran.de Zappn.tv		
Sun, 4. September; 15:00	IC	Leipzig Kings	34 – 31	Rhein Fire	Schauinsland-Reisen-Arena	7,760			
Sun, 4. September; 15:00	IC	Vienna Vikings	6 – 42	Panthers Wrocław	Stadion Olimpijski	2,900	Zappn.tv, Polsat Sport		
Sun, 4. September; 15:00	Central	Stuttgart Surge	13 – 37	Frankfurt Galaxy	PSD Bank Arena	4,300			

=== Standings ===
Northern Conference
Pos	Team	GP	W	L	T	CONF	PF	PA	DIFF	STK	Qualification
1	(Germany) Hamburg Sea Devils	12	11	1	0	6 – 0	424	160	264	W10	Advance to playoffs
2	(Germany) Berlin Thunder	12	7	5	0	3 – 3	324	282	42	L1	
3	(Poland) Panthers Wrocław	12	5	7	0	2 – 4	287	305	−18	W1	
4	(Germany) Leipzig Kings	12	4	8	0	1 – 5	242	370	−128	W2	

Source: europeanleague.football

Central Conference
Pos	Team	GP	W	L	T	CONF	PF	PA	DIFF	STK	Qualification
1	(Austria) Vienna Vikings	12	10	2	0	5–1	352	209	143	L1	Advance to playoffs
2	(Austria) Raiders Tirol	12	8	4	0	3–3	418	229	189	W1	Best 2nd place advances
3	(Germany) Frankfurt Galaxy	12	8	4	0	4–2	386	247	139	W2	
4	(Germany) Stuttgart Surge	12	0	12	0	0–6	113	451	−338	L12	

Source: europeanleague.football

Southern Conference
Pos	Team	GP	W	L	T	CONF	PF	PA	DIFF	STK	Qualification
1	(Spain) Barcelona Dragons	12	8	4	0	5–1	364	225	139	L2	Advance to playoffs
2	(Germany) Rhein Fire	12	7	5	0	4–2	346	314	32	L1	
3	(Germany) Cologne Centurions	12	3	9	0	2–4	301	473	−172	W1	
4	(Turkey) Istanbul Rams	12	1	11	0	1–5	210	499	−289	L5	

Source: europeanleague.football

In case ties inside and between the conferences have to be broken, the rules are:

1. Number of wins
2. Head-to-head matchup (Note: Only applicable if matchups have taken place and with additional rules)
3. Points difference in head-to-head matchups
4. Points scored at away games of head-to-head matchups
5. Total points difference
6. Total points scored
7. Point scored at away games
8. Coin toss performed by the Commissioner or a person (e.g., a prominent sportsmen) determined by the Commissioner

This is notably different from tiebreakers used in the NFL which take strength of schedule into account or the German Football League which values the head-to-head as the first tiebreaker for teams with the same win–loss record, in part to discourage running up the score.

== Play-offs ==
The semifinal games were played on September 10 and 11, 2022. The championship game was played on September 25 in Klagenfurt, Austria.

Semifinals
1	(Germany) Hamburg Sea Devils	19
4	(Austria) Tirol Raiders	7
2	(Austria) Vienna Vikings	39
3	(Spain) Barcelona Dragons	12

Championship Game
(Germany) Hamburg Sea Devils	15
(Austria) Vienna Vikings	27

=== Divisional playoffs ===
==== Hamburg Sea Devils 19, Raiders Tirol 7 ====
Raiders Tirol vs. Hamburg Sea Devils

Quarter	1	2	3	4	Total
Raiders	0	7	0	0	7
Sea Devils	10	0	6	3	19

at Stadion Hoheluft, Hamburg, Germany

- Date: 10 September 2022
- Game time: 14:45 CEST
- Game attendance: 3,158
- Referee: M. Scholz
- Game Book

==== Barcelona Dragons 12, Vienna Vikings 39 ====
Barcelona Dragons vs. Vienna Vikings

Quarter	1	2	3	4	Total
Dragons	0	0	0	12	12
Vikings	7	6	16	10	39

at Football-Zentrum Ravelin, Vienna, Austria

- Date: 11 September 2022
- Game time: 14:45 CEST
- Game attendance: 900
- Referee: W. Ratajczak
- Game Book

=== Championship Game ===
The Vikings won the title in their first season. The Sea Devils had to accept the second defeat in the championship game in the second season. The Championship MVP trophy was won by Kimi Linnainmaa, the Finnish WR of the Vikings, who caught 7 passes for 125 yards, and threw the TD pass to the first lead.

==== Vienna Vikings 27, Hamburg Sea Devils 15 ====
Vienna Vikings vs. Hamburg Sea Devils

Quarter	1	2	3	4	Total
Vikings	7	10	7	3	27
Sea Devils	6	0	6	3	15

at 28 Black Arena, Klagenfurt, Austria

- Date: 25 September 2022
- Game time: 14:45 CEST
- Game attendance: 14,566
- Referee: K. Walentynowicz
- Game Book

== Attendance ==
As of September 04, 2022

Pos	Team	Total	High	Low	Average	Change
1	Rhein Fire	52,527	12,055	7,583	8,755	n/a
2	Frankfurt Galaxy	30,050	7,525	3,025	5,008	+136.2%
3	Raiders Tirol	22,150	4,686	3,032	3,692	n/a
4	Berlin Thunder	21,498	4,624	3,056	3,583	+292.0%
5	Hamburg Sea Devils	21,484	4,936	2,636	3,581	+116.6%
6	Vienna Vikings	20,693	4,523	2,028	3,449	n/a
7	Leipzig Kings	15,600	3,000	2,250	2,600	+25.5%
8	Panthers Wrocław	14,065	3,150	1,715	2,344	−34.9%
9	Stuttgart Surge	12,504	2,690	1,400	2,084	+45.8%
10	Cologne Centurions	11,058	2,530	820	1,843	+57.9%
11	Barcelona Dragons	6,152	1,312	897	1,025	−11.9%
12	Istanbul Rams	2,610	800	300	435	n/a
	League total	230,391	12,055	300	3,200	+77.5%

== Awards ==
=== MVP of the Week ===
Week	Player	Position	Team	Stat	Source
1	Flamur Simon (Germany)	OLB	Cologne Centurions	1 TD, 2 Int, 0.5 sacks, 2.5 TFL	1
2	Zach Edwards (United States)	QB	Barcelona Dragons	3 TD, 1 Int, 108 Yds rushing, 202 Yds passing	2
3	Matt Adam (United States)	QB	Rhein Fire	5 TD, 1 Int, 365 Yds passing	3
4	Giovanni Nanguy (France)	OLB	Hamburg Sea Devils	8 TOT, 2 sacks, 3.5 TFL	
5	Glen Toonga (United Kingdom)	RB	Hamburg Sea Devils	4TD, 17 ATT, 185yards	
6	Kyle Kitchens (United States)	DE	Berlin Thunder	9 TOT, 3.5 sacks, 6.5 TFL	
7	Joe Germinerio (United States)	QB	Berlin Thunder	3 TD, 2 Rush TD, 325 Yds passing	
8	Isaiah Green (United States)	QB	Istanbul Rams	1 Rush TD, 20 CAR, 103 Rush Yds, 148 Yds passing	
9	Glen Toonga (United Kingdom)	RB	Hamburg Sea Devils	4TD, 27 ATT, 111yards	
10	Bye Week				
11	Jadrian Clark (United States)	QB	Rhein Fire	38 ATT, 277 COMP, 485 Pass yards, 7 Pass Tds	
12	Zach Edwards (United States)	QB	Barcelona Dragons	7 Pass Tds, 27 COMP, 321 Yds passing	
13	Nathaniel Robitaille (United States)	WR	Rhein Fire	4 REC TD, 10 REC, 286 Reception Yds	
14	Gabriel Cunningham (United States)	QB	Leipzig Kings	208 Pass Yds, 2 Pass Tds, 128 Rush Yds, 3 Rush TDS	

== Statistical leaders ==
As of September 4, 2022 (end of regular season)

Category	Player	Position	Team	GP	Stat
Passing
Yards	Zach Edwards (United States)	QB	Barcelona Dragons	12	3325
Touchdowns	Zach Edwards (United States)	QB	Barcelona Dragons	12	36
Completions	Zach Edwards (United States)	QB	Barcelona Dragons	12	255
Completion percentage	Jakeb Sullivan (United States)	QB	Frankfurt Galaxy	11	66.3%
Rushing
Yards	Glen Toonga (United Kingdom)	RB	Hamburg Sea Devils	12	1468
Touchdowns	Glen Toonga (United Kingdom)	RB	Hamburg Sea Devils	12	21
Yards per attempt	Florian Wegan (Austria)	RB	Vienna Vikings	12	6.3
Receiving
Yards	Kyle Sweet (United States)	WR	Barcelona Dragons	12	1561
Touchdowns	Kyle Sweet (United States)	WR	Barcelona Dragons	12	17
Receptions	Kyle Sweet (United States)	WR	Barcelona Dragons	12	115
Yards per reception	Nathaniel Robitaille (United States)	WR	Rhein Fire	12	19.1
Defensive
Sacks	Kyle Kitchens (United States)	DE	Berlin Thunder	12	16.0
Tackles	A.J. Wentland (United States)	LB	Leipzig Kings	12	159
Interceptions	Goran Zec (Serbia)	S	Panthers Wrocław	12	6
Kicking
FG Pct	Mehmet Sarıkatipoğlu (Turkey)	K	Istanbul Rams	12	76.9
PAT Pct	Eric Schlomm (Germany)	K	Hamburg Sea Devils	12	88.9

== Broadcasting ==
Selected games of this season are available in free TV of most of the participating countries. For the Austrian and vGerman market, the league's main broadcasting partner is ProSiebenSat.1 Media. All games of the Raiders Tirol and the Vienna Vikings as well as the final in Klagenfurt are broadcast over the Puls 4 network with its sister channel Puls 24 and video-on-demand via Zapppn. In Germany ProSieben MAXX and their online-streaming service ran.de airing games on Saturday and Sunday. Furthermore, the league-owned service More Than Sports TV, which is available over platforms like Zattoo, will show games in Austria, Germany and Switzerland as well as Esport3 in Catalonia, S Sport in Turkey, Polsat Sport in Poland and LIVENow for international streaming. All games are also available worldwide on ELF Gamepass.

Region(s)	Broadcaster(s)
International	ELF Gamepass
Austria	Puls 24; Zappn (Puls 4 Network)
Germany; Austria; Switzerland	ProSieben Maxx ranSport; More Than Sports TV
China	iQIYI
Hungary	Arena4
Italy	Eleven Sports
Poland	Polsat Sport
Spain	Esport3
Turkey	S Sport
United States	For the Fans
Indonesia	Eleven Sport
Malaysia	Eleven Sport
Singapore	Eleven Sport
Taiwan	Eleven Sport
Thailand	Eleven Sport
Philippines	Eleven Sport

== All Stars ==
=== First Team ===
Position	Player	Team	Position	Player	Team
Offense
QB	Sean Shelton (United States)	Raiders Tirol	TE	Adrià Botella Moreno (Spain)	Vienna Vikings
RB	Glen Toonga (United Kingdom)	Hamburg Sea Devils	OT	Michael Habetin (Austria)	Raiders Tirol
FB	Patrick Poetsch (Germany)	Rhein Fire	OT	Sven Breidenbach (Germany)	Rhein Fire
WR	Kyle Sweet (United States)	Barcelona Dragons	OG	Lewis Thomas (United Kingdom)	Hamburg Sea Devils
WR	Robin Wilzeck (Germany)	Berlin Thunder	OG	Niklas Johansson (Sweden)	Vienna Vikings
WR	Nathaniel Robitaille (United States)	Rhein Fire	C	Joachim Christensen (Denmark)	Frankfurt Galaxy
Defense
DT	Tim Hänni (Switzerland)	Hamburg Sea Devils	LB	Thomas Schnurrer (Austria)	Vienna Vikings
DT	Aslan Zetterberg (Sweden)	Leipzig Kings	CB	Karim Ben El Ghali (Germany)	Frankfurt Galaxy
Edge	Kyle Kitchens (United States)	Berlin Thunder	CB	Justin Rogers (United States)	Hamburg Sea Devils
Edge	Alejandro Fernández (Spain)	Barcelona Dragons	S	Kevin Fortes (France)	Hamburg Sea Devils
LB	A. J. Wentland (United States)	Leipzig Kings	S	Omari Williams (United States)	Rhein Fire
LB	Zachary Blair (United States)	Istanbul Rams			
Special Teams
K	Jonas Schenderlein (Germany)	Berlin Thunder	RS	C. J. Okpalobi (United States)	Raiders Tirol
P	Eric Schlomm (Germany)	Hamburg Sea Devils			
Source: europeanleague.football

=== Second Team ===
Position	Player	Team	Position	Player	Team
Offense
QB	Zach Edwards (United States)	Barcelona Dragons	TE	Nicolai Schumann (Germany)	Berlin Thunder
RB	Jocques Crawford (United States)	Berlin Thunder	OT	Tobias Rodlauer (Austria)	Berlin Thunder
FB	León Helm (Germany)	Frankfurt Galaxy	OT	Aleksandar Milanovic (Austria)	Vienna Vikings
WR	Quinten Pounds (United States)	Cologne Centurions	OG	Sven Fischer (Germany)	Frankfurt Galaxy
WR	Jordan Bouah (Italy)	Vienna Vikings	OG	Alper Peközer (Turkey)	Berlin Thunder
WR	Malik Stanley (United States)	Panthers Wrocław	C	David Weinstock (Germany)	Hamburg Sea Devils
Defense
DT	Niklas Gustav (Germany)	Raiders Tirol	LB	Maxime Rouyer (France)	Panthers Wrocław
DT	Christian van Horn (United States)	Rhein Fire	CB	Moritz Thiele (Germany)	Berlin Thunder
Edge	Kasim Edebali (Germany)	Hamburg Sea Devils	CB	Benjamin Straight (Austria)	Vienna Vikings
Edge	Michael Sam (United States)	Barcelona Dragons	S	Goran Zec (Serbia)	Panthers Wrocław
LB	David Izinyon (United Kingdom)	Berlin Thunder	S	Luis Horvath (Austria)	Vienna Vikings
LB	Precious Ogbevoen (Austria)	Stuttgart Surge			
Special Teams
K	Ryan Rimmler (Germany) (United States)	Frankfurt Galaxy	RS	Darius Saint-Robinson (United States)	Panthers Wrocław
P	Maximilian Eisenhut (Germany)	Rhein Fire			
Source: europeanleague.football

== Signees to other professional leagues ==
The following players invited to the NFL's International Combine, assigned to NFL's International Player Pathway Program (IPPP), signed or drafted by CFL team or signed with USFL or XFL team following their involvement with the ELF in 2022:

=== NFL ===
Player	Position	ELF team	NFL team
Alejandro Fernández	DE	Barcelona Dragons	International Combine
Kevin Fortes	S	Hamburg Sea Devils	International Combine
Tim Hänni	DT	Hamburg Sea Devils	International Combine
Tyrese Johnson-Fisher	RB	Istanbul Rams	International Combine
John Levi Kruse	TE	Hamburg Sea Devils	International Combine
Harlan Kwofie	WR	Rhein Fire	International Combine
Lucky Efosa Ogbevoen	LB	Raiders Tirol	International Combine
Tyrese Owuso-Bediako	DL	Rhein Fire	International Combine
Tobias Rodlauer	OT	Berlin Thunder	International Combine
Gabriel Rodríguez	OT	Barcelona Dragons	International Combine
Flamur Simon	OLB	Cologne Centurions	International Combine
Leander Wiegand	OT	Cologne Centurions	International Combine
Stanley Zeregbe	DE	Berlin Thunder	International Combine

=== CFL ===
The following players signed with a CFL team:

Player	Position	ELF team	CFL team
Maxime Rouyer	LB	Panthers Wrocław	BC Lions
Timothy Knuettel	WR	Rhein Fire	Winnipeg Blue Bombers
John Levi Kruse	TE/LS	Hamburg Sea Devils	BC Lions
Lukas Ruoss	LB	Rhein Fire	Saskatchewan Roughriders
Ja'Len Embry	DB	Frankfurt Galaxy	Montreal Alouettes

=== XFL ===
Player	Position	ELF team	XFL team
Justin Rogers	DB	Hamburg Sea Devils	Orlando Guardians

=== USFL ===
Player	Position	ELF team	USFL team
Malcolm Washington	DB	Stuttgart Surge	Houston Gamblers
Chris Richardson	DT	Cologne Centurions	New Orleans Breakers
