= Lamar Jordan =

American football player (born 1994)

No. 5 – New Yorker Lions
- Position: Wide receiver

Personal information
- Born: October 2, 1994 (age 32); Frisco, Texas, U.S.
- Listed height: 6 ft 0 in (1.83 m)
- Listed weight: 192 lb (87 kg)

Career information
- High school: Centennial (Frisco)
- College: New Mexico
- NFL draft: 2018: undrafted

Career history
- Atlanta Falcons (2018)*; Massachusetts Pirates (2020)*; Spokane Shock (2021); Hamburg Sea Devils (2022); New Yorker Lions (2024)
- * Offseason or practice squad member only

Lamar Jordan (born October 2, 1994) is an American professional football wide receiver who is currently playing for the New Yorker Lions of the (GFL). He played college football for the New Mexico Lobos as a quarterback and professionally as a wide receiver for the Hamburg Sea Devils.

== College career ==
=== Statistics ===
| Year | Team | Games | | | Passing | | | | | | | | Rushing | | | |
| Year | Team | GP | GS | Record | Cmp | Att | Pct | Yds | Avg | TD | Int | Rtg | Att | Yds | Avg | TD |
|---|---|---|---|---|---|---|---|---|---|---|---|---|---|---|---|---|
| 2013 | New Mexico | Redshirt (redshirt) | | | | | | | | | | | | | | |
| 2014 | New Mexico | 11 | 4 | 1−3 | 59 | 112 | 52.7 | 895 | 7.1 | 6 | 5 | 128.6 | 120 | 612 | 5.1 | 3 |
| 2015 | New Mexico | 12 | 12 | 7−5 | 61 | 118 | 51.7 | 1,045 | 8.9 | 5 | 8 | 126.5 | 147 | 807 | 5.5 | 9 |
| 2016 | New Mexico | 12 | 9 | 8−1 | 40 | 75 | 53.3 | 681 | 9.1 | 6 | 4 | 145.3 | 114 | 739 | 6.5 | 3 |
| 2017 | New Mexico | 11 | 10 | 2−8 | 46 | 93 | 49.5 | 604 | 6.5 | 3 | 6 | 101.8 | 77 | 343 | 4.5 | 2 |
| Career | | 46 | 35 | 18−17 | 206 | 398 | 51.8 | 3,225 | 8.1 | 20 | 23 | 124.8 | 458 | 2,501 | 5.5 | 17 |

== Professional career ==
=== Atlanta Falcons ===
Jordan signed with the Atlanta Falcons of the National Football League (NFL) as an undrafted free agent on May 1, 2018, and was waived on September 1.

=== Massachusetts Pirates ===
Jordan was signed on November 17, 2019, to the Massachusetts Pirates of the National Arena League (NAL). He was released in May 2020.

=== Spokane Shock ===
In 2021, Jordan signed with the Spokane Shock of the Indoor Football League (IFL).

=== Hamburg Sea Devils ===
In December 2021 Jordan signed with Hamburg Sea Devils in the European League of Football (ELF).

=== New Yorker Lions ===
In 2024, Jordan signed with the New Yorker Lions of the German Football League (GFL). In week 1, Jordan completed six of 16 passing attempts for 131 yards while throwing one touchdown and two interceptions. He also added a rushing touchdown and 97 rushing yards on 23 attempts.

== Career pro statistics ==
Regular season

| Season | Team | Games | | | Passing | | | | | | | | Rushing | | | | Receiving | | | | Kick returns | | | |
| Season | Team | GP | GS | Record (Note: Accounts for only GS as a QB) | Cmp | Att | Pct | Yds | Avg | TD | Int | Rtg | Att | Yds | Avg | TD | Rec | Yds | Avg | TD | Att | Yds | Avg | TD |
|---|---|---|---|---|---|---|---|---|---|---|---|---|---|---|---|---|---|---|---|---|---|---|---|---|
| 2022 | HAM | 12 | 11 | − | 0 | 0 | 0.0 | 0 | 0.0 | 0 | 0 | 0.0 | 1 | 3 | 3.0 | 0 | 35 | 464 | 13.2 | 3 | 28 | 755 | 26.9 | 0 |
| 2024 | NYL | 12 | 3 | 1−1 | 16 | 33 | 48.5 | 310 | 9.4 | 2 | 2 | 135.3 | 43 | 196 | 4.6 | 3 | 6 | 180 | 30.0 | 2 | 8 | 228 | 28.5 | 1 |
| Career | | 24 | 14 | 1−1 | 16 | 33 | 48.5 | 310 | 9.4 | 2 | 2 | 135.3 | 44 | 199 | 4.5 | 3 | 41 | 644 | 15.7 | 3 | 36 | 983 | 27.3 | 1 |

Playoffs

| Season | Team | Games | | Receiving | | | | Rushing | | | | Kick returns | | | |
| Season | Team | GP | GS | Rec | Yds | Avg | TD | Att | Yds | Avg | TD | Att | Yds | Avg | TD |
|---|---|---|---|---|---|---|---|---|---|---|---|---|---|---|---|
| 2022 | HAM | 2 | 2 | 5 | 69 | 13.8 | 1 | 2 | 9 | 4.5 | 0 | 4 | 91 | 22.7 | 0 |
| Career | | 2 | 2 | 5 | 69 | 13.8 | 1 | 2 | 9 | 4.5 | 0 | 4 | 91 | 22.7 | 0 |

=== IFL ===
Regular season

| Season | Team | Games | Receiving | | | | Kick returns | | | |
| Season | Team | GP | Rec | Yds | Avg | TD | Att | Yds | Avg | TD |
|---|---|---|---|---|---|---|---|---|---|---|
| 2021 | Spokane | 4 | 2 | 20 | 10.0 | 0 | 12 | 267 | 22.3 | 1 |
| Career | | 4 | 2 | 20 | 10.0 | 0 | 12 | 267 | 22.3 | 1 |
