= 2022 Panthers Wrocław season =

American football team in Poland

- Head coach: (Poland) Jakub Samel
- Home stadium: Olympic Stadium

Results
- Record: 5 – 7
- Conference place: 3rd

Uniform
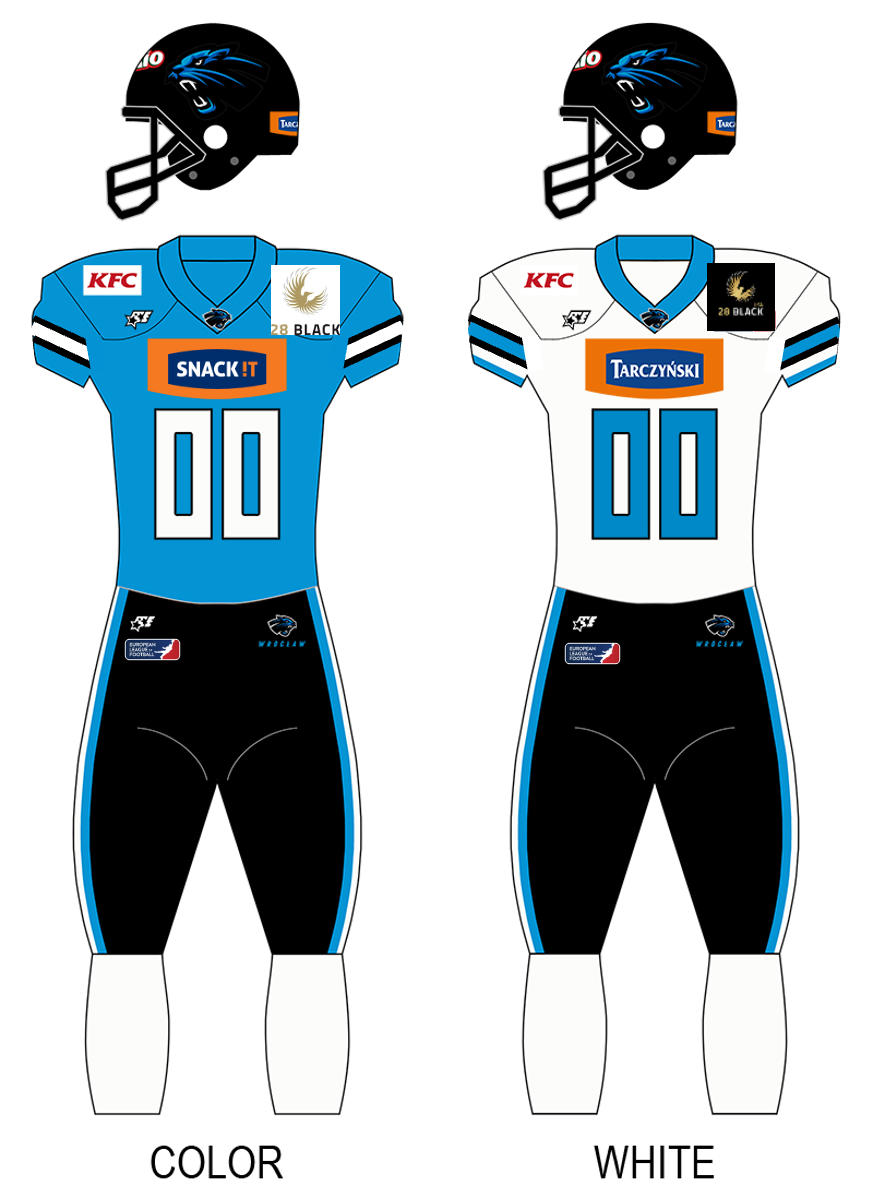

The 2022 Panthers Wrocław season is the second season of the Panthers Wrocław team in the European League of Football, after moving over from the Polish league LFA in 2021.

== Preseason ==
Shortly after the end of the 2021 European League of Football season the franchise announced the re-hiring of head coach Jakub Samel. The first player signed for the upcoming season was former Clemson Tigers football captain Darius Robinson. In the beginning of 2022 the Panthers acquired the services of Gary Kubiak as a football advisor for players and coaching staff. On the other side, the franchise lost three already signed players Keanu Ebanks, KaVonte Turpin and Tadhg Leader as well as coach Jeff Jagodzinski to USFL and CFL teams.

== Regular season ==
=== Standings ===
Northern Conference
Pos	Team	GP	W	L	T	CONF	PF	PA	DIFF	STK	Qualification
1	(Germany) Hamburg Sea Devils	12	11	1	0	6 – 0	424	160	264	W10	Advance to playoffs
2	(Germany) Berlin Thunder	12	7	5	0	3 – 3	324	282	42	L1	
3	(Poland) Panthers Wrocław	12	5	7	0	2 – 4	287	305	−18	W1	
4	(Germany) Leipzig Kings	12	4	8	0	1 – 5	242	370	−128	W2	

Source: europeanleague.football

=== Schedule ===
Week	Date	Time (CET)	Opponent (Note: Intra-Conference games are in bold text)	Result	Record	Venue	TV (Note: All games can also be watched live on ELF Gamepass) (Note: Viewers in brackets if available)	Recap
1	June 5	15:00	Leipzig Kings	W 34 – 27	1 – 0	Olympic Stadium Wrocław	Polsat Sport	
2	June 12	15:00	@ Stuttgart Surge	W 28 – 26	2 – 0	Gazi-Stadion auf der Waldau	Polsat Sport	
3	June 19	15:00	@ Frankfurt Galaxy	L 13 – 47	2 – 1	PSD Bank Arena	Polsat Sport	
4	June 26	15:00	Hamburg Sea Devils	L 23 – 26 (OT)	2 – 2	Olympic Stadium Wrocław	Polsat Sport	
5	July 3	15:00	@ Vienna Vikings	L 6 – 30	2 – 3	Generali Arena Vienna	Polsat Sport, Zappn.tv	
6	July 10	15:00	@ Berlin Thunder	L 25 – 31 (OT)	2 – 4	Friedrich-Ludwig-Jahn-Sportpark	ProSieben MAXX, ran.de, Polsat Sport	
7	July 17	15:00	Stuttgart Surge	W 34 – 0	3 – 4	Olympic Stadium Wrocław	Polsat Sport	
8	July 24	bye						
9	July 31	15:00	Frankfurt Galaxy	L 29 – 30	3 – 5	Olympic Stadium Wrocław	Polsat Sport	
10	August 7	bye						
11	August 14	15:00	Berlin Thunder	L 12 – 29	3 – 6	Olympic Stadium Wrocław	Polsat Sport	
12	August 21	15:00	@ Leipzig Kings	W 41 – 37	4 – 6	Alfred-Kunze-Sportpark	Polsat Sport	
13	August 28	15:00	@ Hamburg Sea Devils	L 0 – 17	4 – 7	Stadion Hoheluft	Polsat Sport	
14	September 4	15:00	Vienna Vikings	W 42 – 6	5 – 7	Olympic Stadium Wrocław	Polsat Sport	

Source: europeanleague.football

== Roster ==
Panthers Wrocław roster
Quarterbacks: Slade Jarman (United States); Running backs: 7 Phileas Pasqualini (France); 24 Adam Skakowski (Poland); 26 Dawid Brzozowski (Poland); 28 Kamil Kotlarz (Poland); 30 Paweł Barul (Poland); Wide receivers: 2 Malik Stanley (United States); 14 Kacper Fiedziuk (Poland); 15 Bartosz Dziedzic QB (Poland); 16 Wiktor Zięba (Poland); 18 Adrian Gródecki (Poland); 23 Jakub Mazan (Poland); 82 Przemysław Banat (Poland); 83 Kamil Muller (Poland); 84 Michał Goszczyński (Poland); 85 Tomasz Dziedzic (Poland); 88 Michał Zięta (Poland); Maciej Krupa (Poland); Tight ends: 10 Miłosz Maćków (Poland); 87 Mateusz Wojak (Poland)	Offensive linemen: 55 Rafał Rogaczewski (Poland); 61 Mateusz Samczuk (Poland); 65 Kamil Piątek (Poland); 66 Mateusz Głogowski (Poland); 71 Thomas Fileccia (France); 72 Jonas Hagerup 🇳🇴; 73 Mateuz Konwent (Poland); 74 Murilo Silva 🇧🇷; Defensive linemen: 42 Jan Chmiel DE (Poland); 50 Szymon Adamczyk DT (Poland); 51 Konrad Paszkiewicz DT (Poland); 52 Filip Snopek DE (Poland); 93 Damian Wesołowski DT (Poland); 96 Piotr Ostrowski DE (Poland); 97 Łukasz Gembara DT (Poland); 98 Aleksander Powar DE (Poland); 99 Robert Rosołek DE (Poland); Jakub Zmaczyński DT (Poland)	Linebackers: 3 Semmie Radji OLB (Netherlands); 4 William Lloyd ILB (United States); 6 Kamil Ruta OLB (Poland); 8 Hubert Ogrodowczyk ILB (Poland); 45 Maxime Rouyer ILB (France); 47 Antoni Idziak ILB (Poland); 49 Kacper Ołdak ILB (Poland); 58 Konrad Stępień OLB (Poland); Defensive backs: 1 Darius Robinson CB (United States); 5 Goran Zec S (Croatia); 19 Daniel Piątkowski S (Poland); 20 Kacper Rokiciński CB (Poland); 25 Adam Lary CB (Poland); 27 Grzegorz Lary CB (Poland); 29 Lars Steffen S (Germany); 31 Szymon Romanowski CB (Poland); 34 Jakub Halicki S (Poland); 89 Bartosz Woźniak S (Sweden); Jamaal White S (United States); Special teams: 12 Dawid Pańczyszyn K (Poland); 35 Krzysztof Wis (Poland)	Reserve lists: 11 Justice Hansen QB (IR) (United States); 21 Przemysław Lewszyk OLB (IR) (Poland); 91 Oskar Romaniuk DL (IR) (Poland); -- Jakub Wąsiel WR (IR) (Poland); -- Szymon Jarmołkowicz DB (IR) (Poland); -- Tomasz Kiszka LB (IR) (Poland); -- Mateusz Dymek DL (IR) (Poland); Rookies in italics Roster updated 23 June 2022; 6 A-import, 8 E-import, 52 homegrown 59 active, 7 inactive

=== Transactions ===
From Hamburg Sea Devils: Keanu Ebanks (December 22, 2021)

== Staff ==
Panthers Wrocław staff
Front office: Chairman of the Board – Michał Latoś; CEO – Karolina Janas; General manager – Jakub Głogowski; Coaching advisor – Gary Kubiak; Head coach: Head coach – Jakub Samel; Main team coordinator – Dariusz Ankiewicz; Offensive coaches: Offensive coordinator –; Quarterbacks –; Running backs – Cory McDiarmid; Assistant running backs –; Wide receivers – Tony Simmons; Tight ends/fullbacks –; Offensive line – Ken Jones	Defensive coaches: Defensive coordinator – Dave Likins; Assistant defense coach – Dariusz Ankiewicz; Assistant defense coach – Nick Barhorst; Linebacker –; Defensive line – David Jackson; Assistant defensive line –; Defensive backs –; Assistant defensive backs –; Special teams coaches: Special teams coordinator – Cory McDiarmid; Assistant special teams –; Assistant coaches: Coaching assistant – Marcin Kochanowski; Data Analysis & Statistics – Jakub Łach; Strength and conditioning: Head strength and conditioning – Łukasz Sutkowski; Assistant strength and conditioning –; updated 10 May 2022
