= 2022 Leipzig Kings season =

- Head coach: (United States) Fred Armstrong
- Home stadium: Alfred-Kunze-Sportpark

Results
- Record: 4 – 8
- Conference place: 4th
- Playoffs: Did not qualify

Uniform
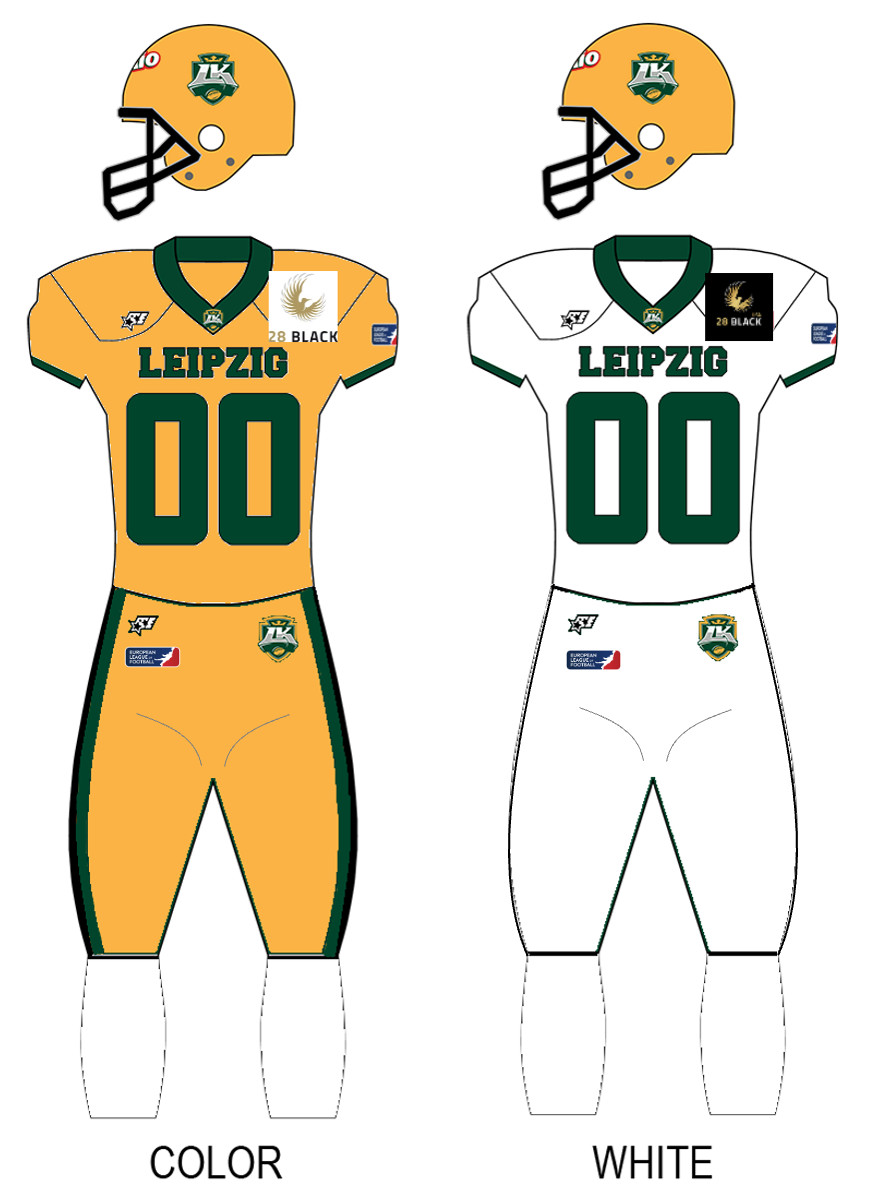

The 2022 Leipzig Kings season in the European League of Football is the second season in the Leipzig Kings history.

== Preseason ==
The franchise began late in the preseason with player signings. The first one was the signing of former Kings running backs coach David McCants and one day later European veteran A.J. Wentland. Leipzig starting quarterback Michael Birdsong announced on March 21, 2022 that he will retire from his professional football career. His replacement for the 2022 season is Jordan Barlow, who was the starting quarterback for the Southwestern Assemblies of God University and won the Victory Bowl in 2021 as well as being named the offensive MVP of the championship game. Like Birdsong previously, he signed a two-year deal with the Kings.

Due to noise emissions in the Alfred-Kunze-Sportpark the team couldn't come to terms with the city for a new lease agreement. The franchise than announced the first home game in a different location with the Paul Greifzu Stadium. For the 2022 season the franchise announced that most of the home games will be held temporarily in the privately owned Bruno-Plache-Stadion of the 1. FC Lokomotive Leipzig.

== Regular season ==
=== Standings ===
Northern Conference
Pos	Team	GP	W	L	T	CONF	PF	PA	DIFF	STK	Qualification
1	(Germany) Hamburg Sea Devils	12	11	1	0	6 – 0	424	160	264	W10	Advance to playoffs
2	(Germany) Berlin Thunder	12	7	5	0	3 – 3	324	282	42	L1	
3	(Poland) Panthers Wrocław	12	5	7	0	2 – 4	287	305	−18	W1	
4	(Germany) Leipzig Kings	12	4	8	0	1 – 5	242	370	−128	W2	

Source: europeanleague.football

=== Schedule ===
Week	Date	Time (CET)	Opponent (Note: Intra-Conference games are in bold text)	Result	Record	Venue	TV (Note: All games can also be watched live on ELF Gamepass) (Note: Viewers in brackets if available)	Recap
1	June 5	15:00	@ Panthers Wrocław	L 27 – 34	0 – 1	Olympic Stadium Wrocław	Polsat Sport	
2	June 12	15:00	Rhein Fire	L 17 – 28	0 – 2	Paul Greifzu Stadium		
3	June 18	17:00	Hamburg Sea Devils	L 0 – 14	0 – 3	Leuna Chemie Stadion	ran.de, Arena4+	
4	June 26	15:00	@ Berlin Thunder	W 19 – 15	1 – 3	Friedrich-Ludwig-Jahn-Sportpark	ProSieben MAXX, ran.de	
5	July 3	15:00	Stuttgart Surge	W 28 – 22	2 – 3	Bruno-Plache-Stadion		
6	July 10	15:00	@ Raiders Tirol	L 6 – 37	2 – 4	Tivoli Stadion Tirol	Puls24, Zappn.tv	
7	July 17	15:00	Berlin Thunder	L 22 – 33	2 – 5	Bruno-Plache-Stadion	ran.de	
8	July 24	bye						
9	July 31	15:00	Raiders Tirol	L 14 – 56	2 – 6	Bruno-Plache-Stadion	Zappn.tv	
10	August 7	bye						
11	August 14	13:00	@ Hamburg Sea Devils	L 0 – 59	2 – 7	Stadion Hoheluft		
12	August 21	15:00	Panthers Wrocław	L 37 – 41	2 – 8	Bruno-Plache-Stadion	Polsat Sport	
13	August 28	15:00	@ Stuttgart Surge	W 38 – 0	3 – 8	Gazi-Stadion auf der Waldau		
14	September 4	15:00	@ Rhein Fire	W 34 – 31	4 – 8	Schauinsland-Reisen-Arena		

Source: europeanleague.football

== Roster ==
Leipzig Kings roster
Quarterbacks: 3 Ferras El-Hendi (Germany); 8 Jordan Barlow (United States); Running backs: 22 Oliver Bahr (Germany); 25 Florian Giese (Germany); 27 Tony Kulok (Germany); 29 Morten Runne FB (Germany); Wide receivers: 6 Leon Kusterer LS (Germany); 7 Seantavius Jones (United States); 11 Anthony Dablé (France); 13 Anton Jallai (Sweden); 14 Erich Kilger (Germany); 17 Simon Braun (Germany); 81 Nils Bäumer (Germany); 83 Jonas "Kobie" Breme (Germany); 89 Timon Stüwe (Germany); Tight ends: 80 Philip Eichhorn (Germany); 85 Anton Doroshev (Germany)	Offensive linemen: 51 Max Bruder (Germany); 68 Pollys Junio Sacramento T (Brazil); 69 Nikita Schönborn (Germany); 72 Lucas Thiem (Germany); 74 Tilman Brütsch C (Germany); 75 Felix Lepper G (Germany); 76 Zachariah Betham (New Zealand); 77 Henri Perl (Germany); 78 Christoph Schob (Germany); Cem Altuntas (Germany); Defensive linemen: 90 Daniel Thiele DT (Germany); 91 Philipp Müller DT (Germany); 92 Aslan Zetterberg DT (Sweden); 93 Christopher Hans DE (Germany); 97 Lance Leota DT (New Zealand)	Linebackers: 5 Jan-Phillip Bombek OLB (Germany); 4 Myke Tavarres ILB (United States); 10 Christian Römer ILB (Germany); 44 Burak Efendioğlu ILB (Germany); 49 A.J. Wentland ILB (United States); 50 Jonas Schultes ILB (Germany); 53 Pascal Topolewski ILB (Germany); 55 Lion Deckwarth ILB (Germany); Defensive backs: 2 Javier Carrasco Sanz S (Spain); 4 Roedion Henrique S (Netherlands); 23 Jonathan Sieveke S (Germany); 24 William James CB (Sweden); 26 Florian Borger S (Germany); 28 Jonathan Dietze S (Germany); 30 Gabriel Kalus CB (Germany); 33 Paul Meißner S (Germany); 34 Dominik Wünsche CB (Germany); 47 Moritz Graul CB (Germany); Special teams: 9 Florian Finke P (Germany); 18 Marcel Ulbrich K (Germany)	Reserve lists: Sasan Jelvani DL (IR) (Germany); Rookies in italics Roster updated 09 June 2022; 4 A-import, 9 E-import, 40 homegrown 52 active, 1 inactive

=== Transactions ===
From Hamburg Sea Devils:

- Jan-Phillip Bombek (February 17, 2022)
- Leon Kusterer (April 1, 2022)

From Panthers Wrocław:

- William James (March 30, 2022)

From Berlin Thunder:

- Pollys Junio Sacramento

From Barcelona Dragons:

- Myke Tavarres

== Staff ==
Leipzig Kings staff
Front office: Owner/general Manager – Moritz Heisler; Executive vice president – Fred Armstrong; Head coach: Head coach – Fred Armstrong; Offensive coaches: Offensive coordinator/offensive line – John Alexander Booker; Assistant offensive line – Jens Kinastowski; Quarterbacks – N/A; Running backs – David McCants; Wide receivers/tight ends – Quang Pham Minh	Defensive coaches: Defensive coordinator/defensive backs – Richard Kent; Linebacker – Demetrius Eaton; Defensive line – Konstantinos "Guss" Kosmakos; Assistant defensive line – Marius Adler; Special teams coaches: Special teams coordinator – Marius Adler; Assistant coaches: Quality control – Quang Pham Minh; Quality control defense – Marius Adler; Strength and conditioning: Head strength and conditioning – N/A; updated 01 June 2022
