= 2022 Vienna Vikings season =

2022 season of the ELF team Vienna Vikings

- Head coach: (United States) Chris Calaycay
- Home stadium: Generali Arena Vienna

Results
- Record: 10 – 2
- Conference place: 1st
- Playoffs: won Championship Game vs. Hamburg Sea Devils 27 – 15

Uniform

The 2022 Vienna Vikings season is the inaugural season of the newly formed Vienna Vikings American Football team in the second season of the European League of Football.

== Preseason ==
After being introduced as one of the 2022 expansion teams, the Vikings announced on October 19, 2021 to continue with Chris Calaycay as a head coach. In November, the Vikings held their first ELF Combine on November 6, 2021 and there after signed the first player with Luis Horvath. The first notable acquisition is the signing of former Clemson Tigers wide receiver Diondre Overton. He then was drafted for the 2022 USFL season by the Philadelphia Stars (2022).

On February 12, 2022 the management of the Vienna Vikings announced that they would play all their home games of this season in one of the most modern stadiums of the league with the Generali Arena Vienna. Before the season, the team had a combined training camp and a friendly scrimmage with the Leipzig Kings.

== Regular season ==
=== Standings ===
Central Conference
Pos	Team	GP	W	L	T	CONF	PF	PA	DIFF	STK	Qualification
1	(Austria) Vienna Vikings	12	10	2	0	5–1	352	209	143	L1	Advance to playoffs
2	(Austria) Raiders Tirol	12	8	4	0	3–3	418	229	189	W1	Best 2nd place advances
3	(Germany) Frankfurt Galaxy	12	8	4	0	4–2	386	247	139	W2	
4	(Germany) Stuttgart Surge	12	0	12	0	0–6	113	451	−338	L12	

Source: europeanleague.football

=== Schedule ===
Week	Date	Time (CET)	Opponent (Note: Intra-Conference games are in bold text)	Result	Record	Venue	TV (Note: All games can also be watched live on ELF Gamepass) (Note: Viewers in brackets if available)	Recap
1	June 5	15:00	@ Raiders Tirol	W 29 – 23	1 – 0	Tivoli Stadion Tirol	Puls24, Zappn.tv	
2	June 12	15:00	Frankfurt Galaxy	W 30 – 10	2 – 0	Generali Arena Vienna	Puls24, Zappn.tv	
3	June 19	15:00	Stuttgart Surge	W 42 – 13	3 – 0	Generali Arena Vienna	Zappn.tv	
4	June 25	18:00	@ Istanbul Rams	W 49 – 0	4 – 0	Maltepe Hasan Polat Stadium	S Sport, Zappn.tv	
5	July 3	15:00	Panthers Wrocław	W 30 – 6	5 – 0	Generali Arena Vienna	Polsat Sport, Puls24, Zappn.tv	
6	July 9	18:00	@ Barcelona Dragons	W 27 – 20	6 – 0	Estadi Municipal de Reus	Esport3, Puls24, Zappn.tv, More Than Sports TV	
7	July 17	bye						
8	July 24	15:00	Raiders Tirol	W 29 – 13	7 – 0	Generali Arena Vienna	Puls24, Zappn.tv	
9	July 30	15:00	@ Stuttgart Surge	W 41 – 0	8 – 0	Gazi-Stadion auf der Waldau		
10	August 7	bye						
11	August 14	15:00	@ Frankfurt Galaxy	L 8 – 42	8 – 1	PSD Bank Arena		
12	August 21	15:00	Istanbul Rams	W 37 – 22	9 – 1	Generali Arena Vienna	S Sport	
13	August 28	15:00	Barcelona Dragons	W 24 – 18	10 – 1	Generali Arena Vienna	Esport3	
14	September 4	15:00	@ Panthers Wrocław	L 6 – 42	10 – 2	Wrocław Olympic Stadion	Polsat Sport	

Source: europeanleague.football

== Roster ==
Vienna Vikings roster
Quarterbacks: 9 Jackson Erdmann (United States); 12 Alexander Reischl (Austria); Running backs: 3 Florian Wegan (Austria); 33 Kende Ráthonyi (Hungary); Wide receivers: 4 Jordan Bouah (Italy); 5 Anton Wegan (Austria); 6 Mike Breuler (United States); 11 Felix Reisacher (Austria); 17 Kimi Linnainmaa (Finland); 19 Nikolaus Rabitsch (Austria); Tight ends: 8 Adrià Botella Moreno (Spain); 15 Rudi-Lee Frey (Austria)	Offensive linemen: 56 Matthew Daltrey C (United Kingdom); 57 Michael Haider LG (Austria); 61 Aleksandar Milanovic LT (Austria); 66 Niklas Johansson (Sweden); 71 Lukas Holub RT (Austria); 77 Toby Lettman (United Kingdom); 74 Benjamin Bierbaumer (Austria); 79 Benjamin Rab RG (Austria); Karl-Frederik Johansson (Sweden); Defensive linemen: 1 Leon Balogh DE (Austria); 46 Vito Millauer DE (Austria); 47 Blake Nelson DE (United States); 52 Oskar Kranich DE (Austria); 75 Florian Sudi DT (Austria); 90 Moritz Schmahel DT (Austria); 91 Dominic Siegel DE (Germany); 92 Marvin Wappl DT (Austria); 94 Florian Grünsteidl DT (Austria); 99 Maximilian Müllner DT (Austria)	Linebackers: 39 Sebastian Huber OLB (Austria); 40 Thomas Schnurrer ILB (Austria); 42 Moritz Elmauthaler ILB (Austria); 44 Leon Huber ILB (Austria); 49 Alex Watholowitsch ILB (Austria); Defensive backs: 7 Exavier Edwards S (United States); 21 Leo Gerner CB (Austria); 22 Christoph Kellner CB (Austria); 23 Benjamin Straight S (Austria) (United States); 27 Nikolaus Huszar CB (Austria); 32 Luis Horvath S (Austria); 36 Fabio Zvonimir Tartarotti CB (Austria); 37 Sebastian Wimmer CB (Austria); Special teams: 2 Dennis Tasic K (Austria); 16 Sebastian Daum P (Austria); 20 Oskar Herz K (Austria)	Reserve lists: 24 Florian Albrecht CB (IR) (Austria); 89 Florian Bierbaumer WR (IR) (Austria); Weston Carr WR (IR) (United States); Raoul Hrouda WR (IR) (Austria); Dustin Illetschko LB (IR) (Austria); Florian Jobst CB (IR) (Austria); Clemens Walz OL (IR) (Austria); Rookies in italics Roster updated 25 June 2022; 6 A-import, 9 E-import, 38 homegrown 46 active, 7 inactive

=== Transactions ===
From Hamburg Sea Devils: Adrià Botella Moreno (December 20, 2021)

== Staff ==
Vienna Vikings staff
Front office: Owners – Constantin Burkheiser, Markus Kraetschmer, Robin Lumsden, AFC Dacia Vienna Vikings e.V.; President – Karl Wurm; Vice president – Michael Holub; General Manager – Lukas Leitner; Head coach: Head coach – Chris Calaycay; Assistant head coach – Max Kössler; Offensive coaches: Offensive coordinator/quarterbacks – Danny Mitchell; Assistant offensive coach – Jochen Adler; Running backs – Ariel Back; Wide receivers/tight ends – Max Kössler; Offensive line – Thomas Tippold	Defensive coaches: Defensive coordinator/linebacker – Daniel Auböck; Assistant defensive coach – Waleri Teplyi; Assistant defensive coach – Özgür Söztekin; Defensive line – Benjamin Sobotka; Defensive backs – Lukas Habersack; Special teams coaches: Special teams coordinator – Lukas Habersack; Assistant coaches: Video assistant – Caspar Prill; Strength and conditioning: Head strength and conditioning – Christoph Putz; updated 27 May 2022
