= Florian Wegan =

Austrian gridiron football player (born 1993)

Vienna Knights
- Position: Running back

Personal information
- Born: December 4, 1993 (age 32)
- Listed height: 5 ft 6 in (1.68 m)
- Listed weight: 212 lb (96 kg)

Career history
- Rangers Mödling (2011–2019); Vienna Vikings (2020–2025); Vienna Knights (2026–present)

Awards and highlights
- Iron Bowl winner (2014); Austrian champion (2020); AFL Co-Offense MVP (2020); AFL Rushing Yards Leader (2021); ELF champion (2022); European Champion (2023)

Florian Wegan (born December 4, 1993) is an Austrian professional football running back for the Vienna Knights of the Austrian Football League.

== Professional career ==
=== Rangers Mödling ===
Wegan, who initially played football and skied as a youth, began playing American football with the AFC Rangers Mödling in 2011. In his first year, despite his young age, he already played on the second men's team. After voluntarily withdrawing from the Austrian Football League (AFL), the Rangers competed in Division II in 2014, which they won by taking Iron Bowl VII. From 2016 onward, Wegan played again in the AFL with the Rangers. In the 2019 season, he gained 839 yards and scored six touchdowns on 138 carries. This placed him among the top three running backs in the league.

=== Vienna Vikings ===
After nine years with the Rangers, Wegan joined the AFC Dacia Vienna Vikings for the 2020 AFL season . In the season, which was shortened to a best-of series against the Graz Giants due to the COVID-19 pandemic, the Vikings won the national championship. Wegan was subsequently named AFL Offensive MVP along with his brother Anton. In the 2021 season, he led the AFL in rushing yards (810) and rushing touchdowns (9). Wegan also represented Austria at the 2021 European Championship.

For the 2022 season, Wegan signed a contract with the Vienna Vikings, who were competing in the European League of Football (ELF) for the first time as a franchise that season. He started the season as a starter and contributed to a winning start with three touchdowns in the first three games. However, Wegan suffered a knee injury that forced him to take a break of several weeks. He returned in week twelve. In the semifinal against the Barcelona Dragons, Wegan scored two touchdowns, and he also ran into the end zone once in the championship game against the Hamburg Sea Devils. With the Vikings, he defeated the Sea Devils 27-15 and became champions. Wegan also played for the Vikings in the 2023 season. In the 2024 season, he played again for the Vikings' AFL team.

=== Vienna Knights ===
For the 2026 season, Wegan signed with the Vienna Knights.

== Personal life ==
Wegan is the older brother of Anton Wegan who is also a football player.
