= Cory McDiarmid =

Canadian gridiron football coach

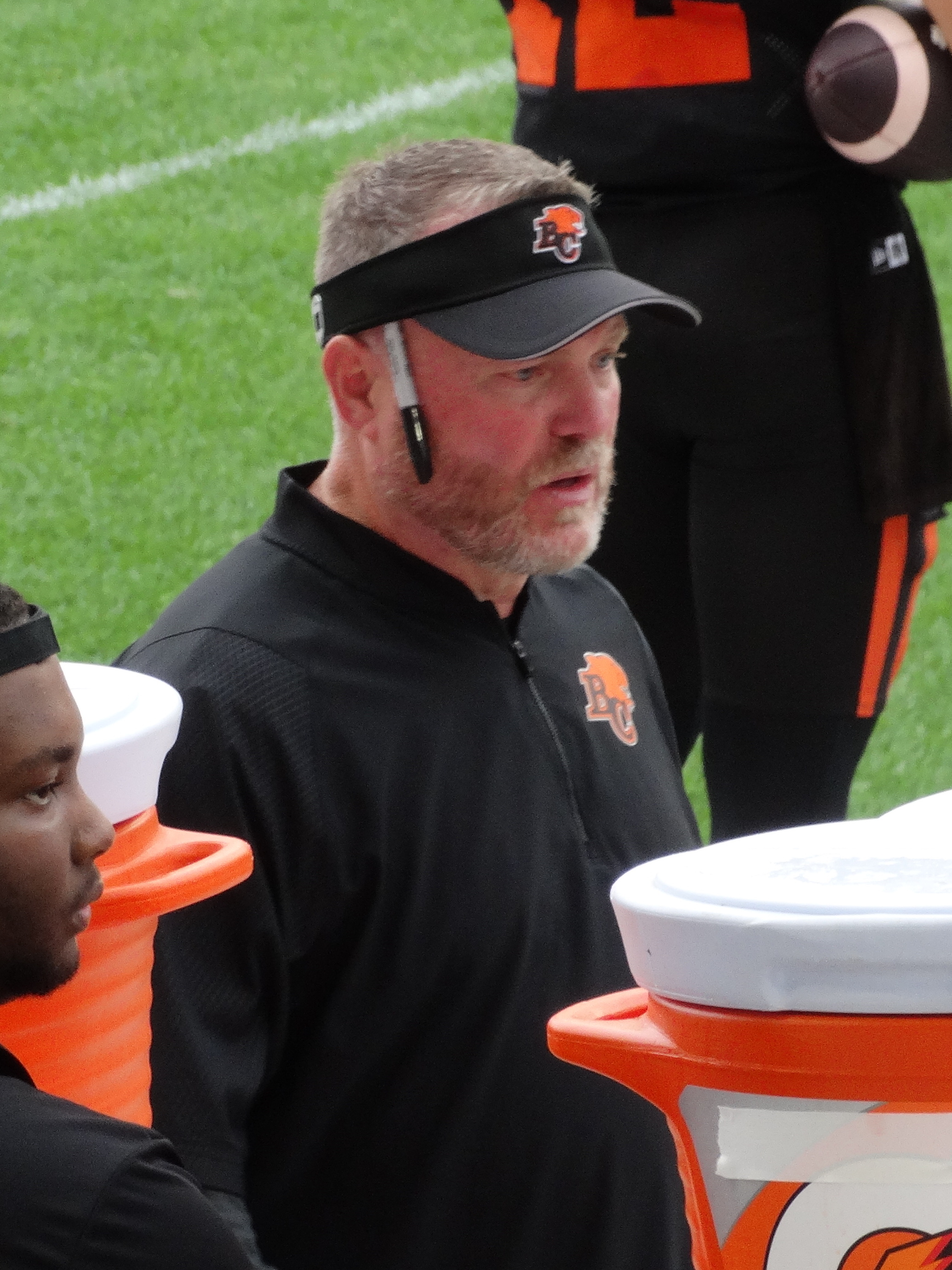
- McDiarmid with the BC Lions in 2025

Personal information
- Born: Nanaimo, British Columbia, Canada

Career information
- High school: Lindsay Thurber (Red Deer, Alberta)
- College: Kwantlen Polytechnic University

Career history
- BC Lions (2000–2002) Special teams coach/RB coach; Toronto Argonauts (2002) LB/DL coach; Calgary Stampeders (2003–2004) ST coord./DL coach; Montreal Alouettes (2005) ST Coord./running backs; Winnipeg Blue Bombers (2006–2009) ST Coord./running backs; Ottawa Gee-Gees (2011–2013) Asst. HC/DC; Saskatchewan Roughriders (2013) Special teams assistant; Winnipeg Blue Bombers (2014–2015) LB coach; Saskatchewan Roughriders (2015) (asst.) Special teams coordinator; Edmonton Eskimos (2016–2018) Special teams coordinator; Toronto Argonauts (2019–2020) Special teams coordinator; Panthers Wrocław (2022) ST Coord./RB coach; Ottawa Redblacks (2022–2024) Special teams coach; BC Lions (2025–2026) Special teams coordinator

Awards and highlights
- 33rd Vanier Cup; 88th Grey Cup; 101st Grey Cup

Cory McDiarmid (born in Nanaimo, B.C.) is a Canadian gridiron football coach who was most recently the special teams coordinator for the BC Lions of the Canadian Football League (CFL). He previously coached in the CFL with several teams and is a two-time Grey Cup winner with the BC Lions and Saskatchewan Roughriders. He has also coached for the Panthers Wrocław in the European League of Football.

== Youth coaching ==
Prior to engagements in professional leagues he was coaching six seasons in the Canadian Junior Football League and three years in the U Sports (formerly known as Canadian Interuniversity Sport) with the University of British Columbia where he won the 33rd Vanier Cup in 1997. Additionally he won the 2000 Canada Cup Championship with the British Columbia's Under 19 Provincial Team where he coached from 1997 to 1999.

He also was defensive coordinator and special teams assistant at the Jim Barker School of Football in 2004.

== Professional coaching career ==
=== BC Lions ===
Coming from successful youth coaching, his first station in professional football was with the BC Lions in the 2000 CFL season where he began as defensive quality control and linebacker coach, and was promoted to Special Teams Coach midway through the season. That year he won the 88th Grey Cup with the team. For the 2001 CFL season he was promoted to special teams coordinator and running backs coach.

=== Toronto Argonauts ===
His first stint with the Toronto Argonauts was in the 2002 CFL season where he was coaching the defensive line and linebackers. He later was their special teams coordinator for the 2019 and 2020 season.

=== Calgary Stampeders ===
For the 2003 and 2004 CFL season he was the special teams coordinator and defensive line coach of the Calgary Stampeders.

=== Montreal Alouettes ===
McDiarmid later became special teams coach and running backs coach for the Montreal Alouettes in the 2005 CFL season. That year Montreal lost to Edmonton, in double overtime, in the 93rd Grey Cup game held in Vancouver, BC.

=== Winnipeg Blue Bombers ===
The first stint with the Blue Bombers was between 2006 and 2009 where he was also the special teams coordinator and running backs coach. In 2007 the Blue Bombers made it to the 95th Grey Cup, losing to Saskatchewan Roughriders 23–19, without their starting QB who was lost in the previous game with a broken arm. In his second stint he served as linebackers coach from 2014 to 2015.

=== Saskatchewan Roughriders ===
In the 2013 season McDiarmid won his second Grey Cup title with the Saskatchewan Roughrider in the 2013 CFL season as the special teams assistant. He later was hired again for the 2015 CFL season where he began as assistant special teams coordinator and was later promoted to coordinator when Bob Dyce was named Head Coach.

=== Edmonton Eskimos ===
The Edmonton Eskimos (now called Edmonton Elks) hired McDiarmid as their special teams coordinator for the 2016 CFL season in an all-new coaching Staff under head coach Jason Maas team. He was there till the 2018 CFL season after he was released by the management.

=== Ottawa Redblacks ===
On October 6, 2022, it was announced that McDiarmid had joined the Ottawa Redblacks to serve as a special teams assistant coach.

=== ELF coaching ===
On March 21, 2022, the Panthers Wrocław in the European League of Football announced that McDiarmid will serve as the special teams coordinator and running backs coach for the 2022 season. It is his first coaching station outside of Canada.

=== BC Lions (II) ===
On January 2, 2025, it was announced that McDiarmid had joined the BC Lions to serve as the team's special teams coordinator. After the first three games of the 2026 season, he was fired on June 28, 2026.

== Private life ==
McDiarmid has a degree in criminology and worked as a federal correctional officer for the Correctional Service of Canada.
