= 2022 Hamburg Sea Devils season =

American football team in Germany

2022 Hamburg Sea Devils (ELF) season
- General manager: Max Paatz
- Head coach: Charles "Yogi" Jones
- Home stadium: Stadion Hoheluft

Results
- Record: 11 – 1
- Conference place: 1st
- Playoffs: lost Championship Game vs. Vienna Vikings 15 – 27

Uniform
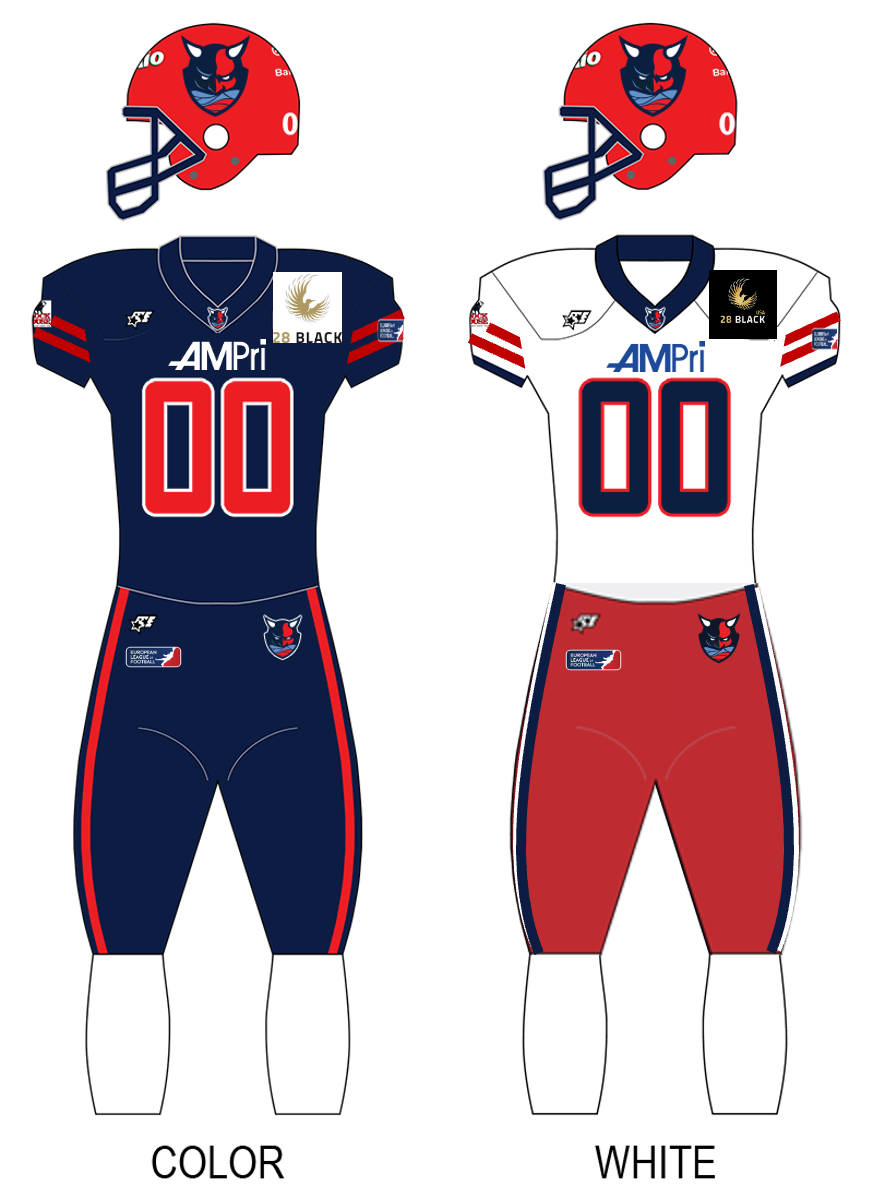

The 2022 Hamburg Sea Devils season is the second season of the Hamburg Sea Devils team in the European League of Football.

== Preseason ==
On November 24, 2021, the Hamburg Sea Devils began to announce their first player signings, beginning with their running back Glen Toonga. The head coach and offensive coordinator Andreas Nommensen stated in December 2021 that he won't return for the 2022 season for personal reasons. On February 3, 2022, Charles "Yogi" Jones was officially announced as the new head coach for the season.

== Regular season ==
=== Standings ===
Northern Conference
Pos	Team	GP	W	L	T	CONF	PF	PA	DIFF	STK	Qualification
1	(Germany) Hamburg Sea Devils	12	11	1	0	6 – 0	424	160	264	W10	Advance to playoffs
2	(Germany) Berlin Thunder	12	7	5	0	3 – 3	324	282	42	L1	
3	(Poland) Panthers Wrocław	12	5	7	0	2 – 4	287	305	−18	W1	
4	(Germany) Leipzig Kings	12	4	8	0	1 – 5	242	370	−128	W2	

Source: europeanleague.football

=== Schedule ===
Week	Date	Time (CET)	Opponent (Note: Intra-Conference games are in bold text)	Result	Record	Venue	TV (Note: All games can also be watched live on ELF Gamepass) (Note: Viewers in brackets if available)	Recap
1	June 5	15:00	Berlin Thunder	W 43 – 18	1 – 0	Stadion Hoheluft		
2	June 12	15:00	Barcelona Dragons	L 21 – 24	1 – 1	Stadion Hoheluft	Esport3, ran.de, ProSieben MAXX	
3	June 18	18:00	@ Leipzig Kings	W 14 – 0	2 – 1	Leuna Chemie Stadion	ran.de, Arena4+	
4	June 26	15:00	@ Panthers Wrocław	W 26 – 23 (OT)	3 – 1	Olympic Stadium Wrocław	Polsat Sport	
5	July 3	15:00	Rhein Fire	W 42 – 15	4 – 1	Stadion Hoheluft	ProSieben MAXX	
6	July 9	15:00	@ Istanbul Rams	W 70 – 0	5 – 1	Maltepe Hasan Polat Stadium	S Sport, ran.de	
7	July 17	bye						
8	July 24	15:00	@ Rhein Fire	W 40 – 16	6 – 1	Schauinsland-Reisen-Arena	ProSieben MAXX, ran.de	
9	July 31	15:00	Istanbul Rams	W 29 – 26 (OT)	7 – 1	Stadion Hoheluft	S Sport	
10	August 7	bye						
11	August 14	13:00	Leipzig Kings	W 59 – 0	8 – 1	Stadion Hoheluft		
12	August 21	15:00	@ Berlin Thunder	W 39 – 17	9 – 1	Friedrich-Ludwig-Jahn-Sportpark		
13	August 27	15:00	Panthers Wrocław	W 17 – 0	10 – 1	Stadion Hoheluft		
14	September 3	18:00	@ Barcelona Dragons	W 24 – 21	11 – 1	Estadi Municipal de Reus		

Source: europeanleague.football

== Roster ==
Hamburg Sea Devils (ELF) roster
Quarterbacks: 1 Salieu Ceesay (Germany); 4 Moritz Maack (Germany); Running backs: 7 Glen Toonga (United Kingdom); 20 Gerald Ameln (Germany); 26 Simon Ajuwon Homadi (Germany); 32 Jamen Wernke (Germany); 45 Jeremy Sarfo FB (Germany); Wide receivers: 2 Tobias Nill (Germany); 5 Jean Constant (United States); 10 Jean-Claude Madin Cerezo (Germany); 11 Benjamin Mau (Germany); 13 Tim Albrecht (Germany); 16 Lamar Jordan II (United States); 19 Nassim Amroun (Germany); 80 Diego Antonio Arboleda Sánchez (Germany); 81 Bais Kouanda (Germany); 89 Lukas Rehder (Germany); Tight ends: 18 Marvin Amankwah (Germany); 44 John Levi Kruse (Germany)	Offensive linemen: 51 Gian De Guzman (Germany); 61 Florian Rosenberger (Germany); 63 Lewis Thomas (United Kingdom); 65 Ron Mac Spiegel (Germany); 68 Dominik Behrens (Germany); 69 David Weinstock (Germany); 70 Shalom Baafi (Germany); 71 Francis Bongwalanga T (United Kingdom); 72 Niklas Wiem (Germany); 74 Dennis Kenzler (Germany); 77 Robin Fensch (Germany); Defensive linemen: 62 Eric De Souza DT (Germany); 94 Berend Grube DE (Germany); 95 Evans Yeboah DT (Germany); 96 Tim Haenni DT (Switzerland); 98 Hiswill Awuah DT (Germany); 99 Nelson Imasuen DE (Canada)	Linebackers: 3 Miguel Alessandro Boock ILB (Germany); 29 Pascal Brinkers OLB (Germany); 40 Matthias Spiegel ILB (Germany); 49 Lars Bardenhagen ILB (Germany); 52 Ambroise Mati OLB (Germany); 54 Thiago Lessow OLB (Germany); 55 Dustin Mohrdieck ILB (Germany); 56 Giovanni Nanguy OLB (France); 57 Daniel Laporte MLB (Germany); 58 Brian-Tom Lohse OLB (Germany); 59 Lorenzo Deiana OLB (Germany); 91 Kasim Edebali OLB (Germany); Defensive backs: 6 Jamal Okeke (Germany); 14 Maximilian Wessel (Germany); 15 Kevin Fortes (France); 21 Vincent Wilson-Oberko (Germany); 22 Aleksandr Astahin S (Germany); 23 Justin Rogers (United States); 25 Daniel Brown (United States); 27 Louis Müller CB (Germany); 28 Barry Maruschke (Germany); 33 Eldert Terekuu CB (Germany); Special teams: 8 Eric Schlomm K/P (Germany)	Rookies in italics Roster updated 04 June 2022; 4 A-import, 6 E-import, 49 homegrown 59 active

=== Transactions ===
From Barcelona Dragons: Jéan Constant (December 6, 2021)

From Leipzig Kings: Shalom Baafi (February 21, 2022)

== Staff ==
2022 Hamburg Sea Devils staff
Front office: CEO – Zeljko Karajica; General Manager – Max Paatz; Head coach: Head coach – Charles "Yogi" Jones; Offensive coaches: Offensive coordinator/wide receivers – Philipp Schulz; Quarterbacks – Marico Gregersen; Running backs – Sören Hauff; Assistant running backs – Nico Novak; Tight ends/fullbacks – N/A; Offensive line – Marten Töwe; Offensive quality – John Shoop	Defensive coaches: Defensive coordinator – Kendral Ellison; Assistant linebacker – Moses Sarwary; Defensive line – Malik Ademote; Defensive backs – Kenneth Flanders; Assistant defensive backs – Karin Tries; Special teams coaches: Special teams coordinator – Florian Voss; Strength and conditioning: Head strength and conditioning – Max Döringer; Staff updated 12 July 2022
