= 2022 Berlin Thunder season =

2022 Berlin Thunder (ELF) season
- General manager: Diana Hoge
- Head coach: (Germany) Johnny Schmuck
- Home stadium: Friedrich-Ludwig-Jahn-Sportpark

Results
- Record: 7 – 5
- Conference place: 2nd

Uniform
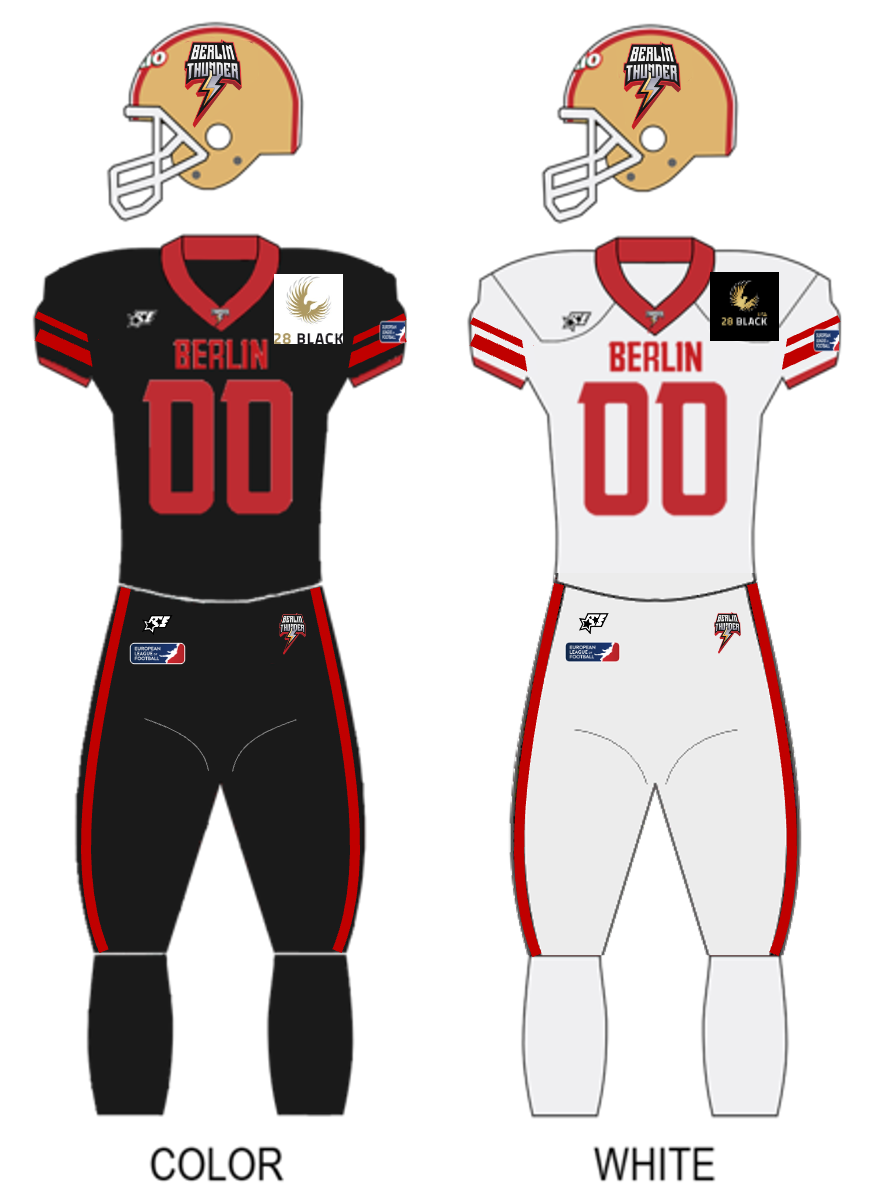

The 2022 Berlin Thunder season is the second season of the Berlin Thunder team in the European League of Football.

== Preseason ==
The Berlin Thunder started to resign their players on October 21, 2021 for the 2022 ELF season with the signing of leading rusher Joc Crawford. For this season the Berlin franchise introduced the league wide first season tickets for their home games. In an episode of their own published podcast, the director of football operations Björn Werner confirmed to not hold any form of combine for the 2022 season

== Regular season ==
=== Standings ===
Northern Conference
Pos	Team	GP	W	L	T	CONF	PF	PA	DIFF	STK	Qualification
1	(Germany) Hamburg Sea Devils	12	11	1	0	6 – 0	424	160	264	W10	Advance to playoffs
2	(Germany) Berlin Thunder	12	7	5	0	3 – 3	324	282	42	L1	
3	(Poland) Panthers Wrocław	12	5	7	0	2 – 4	287	305	−18	W1	
4	(Germany) Leipzig Kings	12	4	8	0	1 – 5	242	370	−128	W2	

Source: europeanleague.football

=== Schedule ===
Week	Date	Time (CET)	Opponent (Note: Intra-Conference games are in bold text)	Result	Record	Venue	TV (Note: All games can also be watched live on ELF Gamepass) (Note: Viewers in brackets if available)	Recap
1	June 5	15:00	@ Hamburg Sea Devils	L 18 – 43	0 – 1	Stadion Hoheluft		
2	June 11	15:00	Istanbul Rams	W 41 – 7	1 – 1	Friedrich-Ludwig-Jahn-Sportpark	S Sport, ran.de, More Than Sports TV	
3	June 19	15:00	@ Raiders Tirol	L 16 – 28	1 – 2	Tivoli Stadion Tirol	Zappn.tv, Puls24	
4	June 26	15:00	Leipzig Kings	L 15 – 19	1 – 3	Friedrich-Ludwig-Jahn-Sportpark	ProSieben MAXX, ran.de	
5	July 2	15:00	@ Cologne Centurions	W 34 – 7	2 – 3	Südstadion	ran.de	
6	July 10	15:00	Panthers Wrocław	W 31 – 25 (OT)	3 – 3	Friedrich-Ludwig-Jahn-Sportpark	ProSieben MAXX, ran.de, Polsat Sport	
7	July 17	15:00	@ Leipzig Kings	W 33 – 22	4 – 3	Bruno-Plache-Stadion	ran.de	
8	July 24	bye						
9	July 31	15:00	Cologne Centurions	W 39 – 29	5 – 3	Friedrich-Ludwig-Jahn-Sportpark	ProSieben MAXX, ran.de	
10	August 7	bye						
11	August 14	15:00	@ Panthers Wrocław	W 29 – 12	6 – 3	Olympic Stadium Wrocław		
12	August 21	15:00	Hamburg Sea Devils	L 17 – 39	6 – 4	Friedrich-Ludwig-Jahn-Sportpark		
13	August 27	15:00	@ Istanbul Rams	W 38 – 14	7 – 4	Maltepe Hasan Polat Stadium		
14	September 4	15:00	Raiders Tirol	L 1ß – 37	7 – 5	Friedrich-Ludwig-Jahn-Sportpark	ProSieben MAXX, ran.de	

Source: europeanleague.football

== Roster ==
Berlin Thunder (ELF) roster
Quarterbacks: 9 Joe Germinerio (United States); 18 Ian Gehrke WR (Germany); Running backs: 1 Joc Crawford (United States); 5 Giacomo DePauli (Germany); 22 Albert Wiesigstrauch (Germany); 24 Tim Schulz (Germany); Wide receivers: 6 Willi Dill (Germany); 7 Robin Wilzeck (Germany); 11 Bryan Zerbe (Germany); 17 Emil Drossard (Germany); 84 Kélian Mouliom (Germany); 89 Philipp Schuhmann (Germany); Tight ends: 13 Yannis Binner (Germany); 85 Nicolai Schumann WR (Germany); 86 Tillman Bolk (Germany)	Offensive linemen: 51 Alper Peközer (Turkey); 52 Oleg Gerats (Germany); 56 Connor Bolton (United Kingdom); 66 Lawrence Cornwall-Baptiste (United Kingdom); 69 Jannik Werblow (Germany); 70 Tobias Rodlauer (Austria); 71 Gideon Grabert (Germany); 72 Maximilian Kempchen (Germany); 73 Marcel Camenz (Germany); 77 Max Bähr (Germany); 79 Cedric Ouattara (Germany); Defensive linemen: 2 Stanley Zeregbe DE (France); 45 Kyle Kitchens DE (United States); 44 Marcel Steffen DE (Germany); 48 Falco Paris DE (Germany); 50 Hamsa El-Zein DT (Germany); 90 Ben Baierl DT (Germany); 92 Tuna Hiller DT (Germany); 95 Nick Rudloff DT (Germany); 96 Marcel Behm DT (Germany); 97 Kay Wagner DT (Germany); 99 Michael Stark DT (Germany)	Linebackers: 8 Paul Seifert OLB (Germany); 10 Baran Çelik ILB (Germany); 14 Kevin Hummel OLB (Germany); 27 Rayan Khefif ILB (France); 30 Ludvig Myrén OLB (Sweden); 31 Simon Leinauer (Germany); 40 Jeremy Sommerwerk ILB (Germany); 55 Marius Markert ILB (Germany); 80 Aaron Rosemann OLB (Germany); Defensive backs: 3 Arne Gehrt S (Germany); 10 Dominique Shelton S (United States); 12 Alexander Karim Rushdy Stadahl CB (Germany); 15 Moritz Thiele CB (Germany); 19 Phillip Ruffin CB (Germany); 20 Robby Kendall S (United States); 21 Amir Kilani S (France); 23 Paul Fischer CB (Germany); 33 Felix Mohlberg S (Germany); Special teams: 26 Jonas Schenderlein K/P (Germany)	Practice squad: Luca Dohn OL (Germany); Rookies in italics Roster updated 04 June 2022; 4 A-import, 8 E-import, 44 homegrown 55 active, 1 practice squad

=== Transactions ===
From Leipzig Kings: Kyle Kitchens (November 12, 2021)

== Staff ==
Berlin Thunder (ELF) staff
Front office: Owner – FBG Football Berlin GmbH; CEO – Levon Melikian; General Manager – Diana Hoge; Director of football – Björn Werner; Head of scouting/quality control – Henry Schlegel; Head of operations – Marcus Döbler; Head coach: Head coach – Johnny Schmuck; Offensive coaches: Offensive coordinator – Johnny Schmuck; Offensive assistant – Kyle Israel; Quarterbacks – Darius Outlaw; Running backs – Curtis Cooper; Wide receivers – Elijah Pope; Tight ends/fullbacks –; Offensive line – Jörg Bauerfeind; Assistant offensive line – Ron Bauerfeind; Offensive assistant – Leeroy Foster	Defensive coaches: Defensive coordinator – Christopher Kuhfeldt; Defensive line – Islam Abzorov; Linebackers –; Defensive backs – Simon Bohlmann; Defensive assistant – Mario Baierl; Special teams coaches: Special teams coordinator – Jörg Bauerfeind; Assistant coaches: Mental coach – Fatima Yazici; Strength and conditioning: Head athletic coach – Christopher Kuhfeldt; Staff updated 05 May 2022
