= Maxime Rouyer =

French gridiron football player (born 1994)

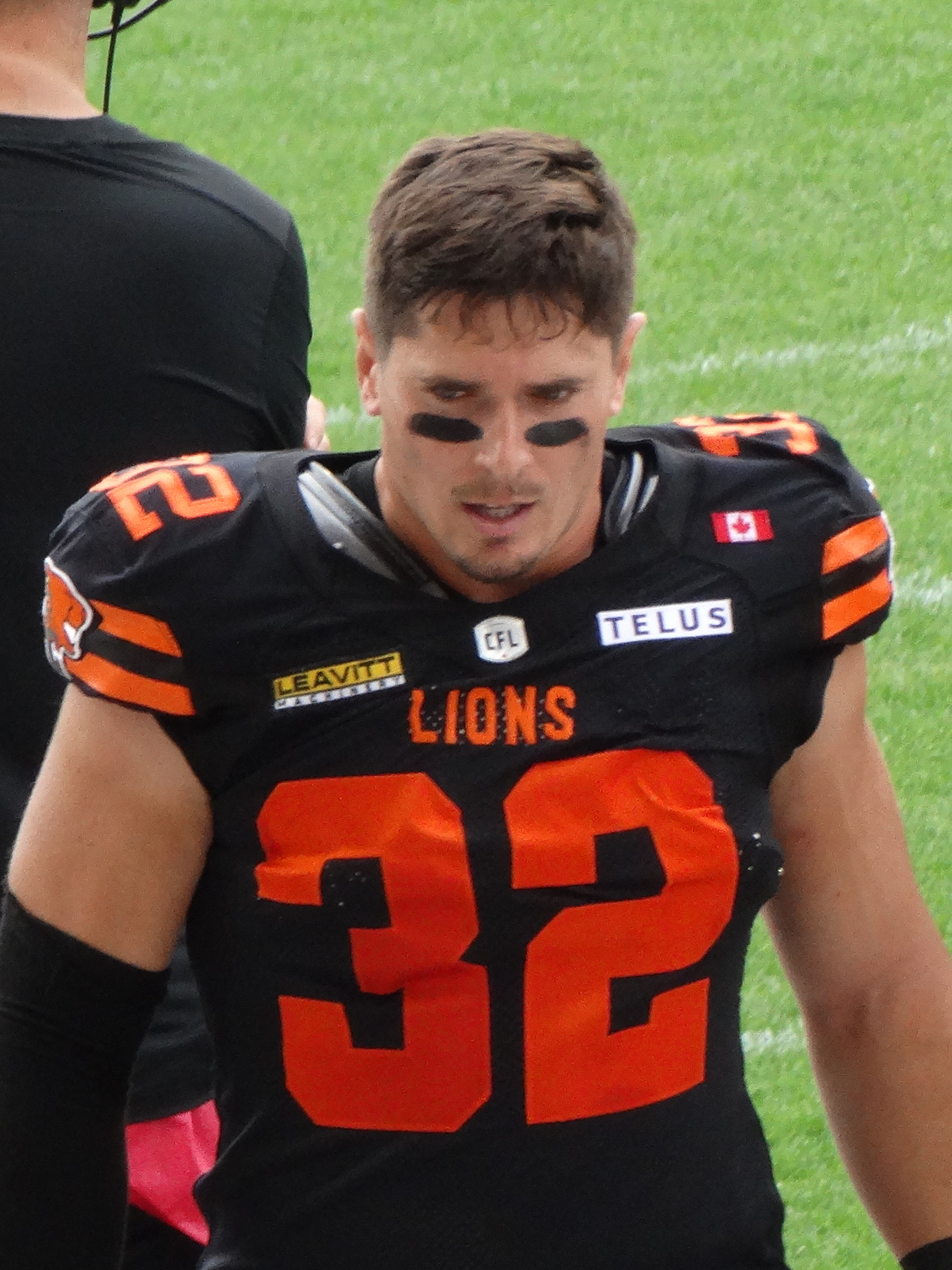
- Rouyer with the BC Lions in 2025

No. 32 – BC Lions
- Position: Linebacker
- Roster status: Active
- CFL status: National

Personal information
- Born: July 16, 1994 (age 32); Troyes, France
- Listed height: 6 ft 0 in (1.83 m)
- Listed weight: 225 lb (102 kg)

Career information
- University: McGill
- CFL draft: 2019 Euro: 1st round, 4th overall pick

Career history
- Edmonton Eskimos / Elks (2019–2021); Panthers Wrocław (2022); BC Lions (2022–present)

Awards and highlights
- Second-team All-ELF (2022)

Career CFL statistics as of 2026
- Games played: 66
- Defensive tackles: 8
- Special teams tackles: 26
- Stats at CFL.ca

Maxime Rouyer (born July 16, 1994) is a French professional gridiron football linebacker for the BC Lions of the Canadian Football League (CFL). He has also played for the Edmonton Elks of the CFL and the Panthers Wrocław of the European League of Football (ELF).

== College career ==
Born in Troyes, where he started practicing gridiron football with Pygargues de Troyes when he was sixteen, Rouyer moved to Canada and started playing Canadian football, first, two seasons at the Cégep de Jonquière. He then played U Sports football from 2015 to 2018, for the McGill Redmen, while also earning a major in Physical Education & Health. During his time as a linebacker for the Redmen, Rouyer played 23 games and recorded 103 total tackles and 4.5 quarterback sacks.

== Professional career ==
Pre-draft measurables
Height	Weight	40-yard dash	20-yard shuttle	Three-cone drill	Vertical jump	Broad jump	Bench press
6 ft 0 1/8 in (1.83 m)	225 lb (102 kg)	4.96 s	4.57 s	7.34 s	33.5 in (0.85 m)	9 ft 11 1/2 in (3.04 m)	16 reps
All values from CFL Combine

=== Edmonton Eskimos / Elks ===
Rouyer was selected by the Edmonton Eskimos as the fourth overall selection of the 2019 CFL European draft and was signed by the team on May 16, 2019. He made the team's active roster following training camp and made his professional debut on June 14, 2019, against the Montreal Alouettes. Rouyer played in 17 regular season games and was credited with three special teams tackles, as well as both playoff games where he recorded another special teams tackle. In the final regular season game of the year, Rouyer and teammate Diego Viamontes became the first Global teammates to be active in the same game.

Rouyer did not play in 2020 following the cancellation of the 2020 CFL season. He re-signed with Edmonton on a contract extension through 2021 on December 26, 2020. He played in one regular season game in 2021 where he had one special teams tackle. He was released on February 28, 2022.

=== Panthers Wrocław ===
On May 19, 2022, the Panthers Wrocław announced that Rouyer had joined their 2022 roster. He had 89 tackles, 4.5 sacks, and three fumble recoveries, including one that he returned for a touchdown.

=== BC Lions ===
Following the end of the Panthers' 2022 season, Rouyer signed with the BC Lions on September 14, 2022. He played in the final seven regular season games in 2022 where he had one forced fumble. He also played in both playoff games that year where he had one special teams tackle.

In 2023, he played in 11 regular season games where he recorded one defensive tackle and six special teams tackles. He played in 16 regular season games in 2024 and had seven defensive tackles and 14 special teams tackles.

On June 6, 2025, Rouyer was placed on the Lions' 1-game injured list to start the 2025 season. He rejoined the active roster on July 13, 2025. On September 11, 2025, Rouyer was again placed on the Lions' 1-game injured list. He rejoined the active roster on September 8, 2025. On September 25, 2025, he was placed on the Lions' 1-game injured list for the third time that season, where he spent the remainder of the 2025 CFL season. As a result of injuries, Rouyer played in just eight games where he had two special teams tackles.

Following the 2025 season, Rouyer was granted a one-time exemption where the league changed his roster status from Global to National. This was more in line with the updated rule where a Non-Canadian player could be ruled as a National player if they had played at least three years of U Sports football. Rouyer was the only player that would have qualified for this update.

On February 10, 2026, Rouyer re-signed with the Lions, on a one-year contract extension. On July 3, 2026, Rouyer was placed on the Lions' 6-game injured list. He rejoined the active roster on August 22, 2026. On September 11, 2026, Rouyer was again placed on the Lions' 6-game injured list. He rejoined the active roster on October 30, 2026, ahead of the Western Semi-Final.
