= 2022 Raiders Tirol season =

American football team in Austria

- Head coach: (United States) / (Germany) Kevin Herron
- Home stadium: Tivoli Stadion Tirol

Results
- Record: 8 – 4
- Conference place: 2nd
- Playoffs: lost Semifinals vs. Hamburg Sea Devils 7 – 19

Uniform

The 2022 Raiders Tirol season is the inaugural season of the newly formed Raiders Tirol team in the second season of the European League of Football.

== Preseason ==
The Raiders Tirol joined the ELF via a press release on September 25, 2021, after winning multiple times their national league AFL. On the November 14, 2021 the Raiders confirmed Kevin Herron as their headcoach for the 2022 ELF season and later confirmed in an interview, that their official name of the team will be Raiders Tirol in dropping the name sponsorship.

== Regular season ==
=== Standings ===
Central Conference
Pos	Team	GP	W	L	T	CONF	PF	PA	DIFF	STK	Qualification
1	(Austria) Vienna Vikings	12	10	2	0	5–1	352	209	143	L1	Advance to playoffs
2	(Austria) Raiders Tirol	12	8	4	0	3–3	418	229	189	W1	Best 2nd place advances
3	(Germany) Frankfurt Galaxy	12	8	4	0	4–2	386	247	139	W2	
4	(Germany) Stuttgart Surge	12	0	12	0	0–6	113	451	−338	L12	

Source: europeanleague.football

=== Schedule ===
Week	Date	Time (CET)	Opponent (Note: Intra-Conference games are in bold text)	Result	Record	Venue	TV (Note: All games can also be watched live on ELF Gamepass) (Note: Viewers in brackets if available)	Recap
1	June 5	15:00	Vienna Vikings	L 23 – 29	0 – 1	Tivoli Stadion Tirol	Puls24, Zappn.tv	
2	June 11	15:00	@ Cologne Centurions	L 46 – 49	0 – 2	Südstadion		
3	June 19	15:00	Berlin Thunder	W 28 – 16	1 – 2	Tivoli Stadion Tirol	Puls24, Zappn.tv	
4	June 26	15:00	@ Stuttgart Surge	W 33 – 0	2 – 2	Gazi-Stadion auf der Waldau	Puls24, Zappn.tv	
5	July 3	15:00	Frankfurt Galaxy	W 23 – 17	3 – 2	Tivoli Stadion Tirol	Puls24, Zappn.tv	
6	July 10	15:00	Leipzig Kings	W 37 – 6	4 – 2	Tivoli Stadion Tirol	Puls24, Zappn.tv	
7	July 17	bye						
8	July 24	15:00	@ Vienna Vikings	L 13 – 29	4 – 3	Generali Arena Vienna	Puls24, Zappn.tv	
9	July 31	15:00	@ Leipzig Kings	W 56 – 14	5 – 3	Alfred-Kunze-Sportpark	Puls24, Zappn.tv	
10	August 7	bye						
11	August 14	15:00	Stuttgart Surge	W 44 – 3	6 – 3	Tivoli Stadion Tirol		
12	August 21	15:00	Cologne Centurions	W 45 – 20	7 – 3	Tivoli Stadion Tirol		
13	August 28	15:00	@ Frankfurt Galaxy	L 33 – 36	7 – 4	PSD Bank Arena		
14	September 4	15:00	@ Berlin Thunder	W 37 – 10	8 – 4	Friedrich-Ludwig-Jahn-Sportpark		

Source: europeanleague.football

== Roster ==
Raiders Tirol roster
Quarterbacks: 12 Sean Shelton (United States); Running backs: 22 Logan Moragne (United States); 24 Lukas Haslwanter (Austria); 25 Tobias Bonatti (Austria); 34 Filip Vlajic (Serbia); Wide receivers: 4 Marco Schneider (Austria); 6 Adrian Platzgummer (Austria); 10 Philipp Haun (Austria); 14 Yannick Mayr (Austria); 80 Fabian Abfalter (Austria); 82 Jan Grischenig (Austria); 85 Markus Schaberl (Austria); 86 Lukas Fink (Austria); 87 Toni Rabensteiner (Italy)	Offensive linemen: 52 Josef Fuksa LT (Czech Republic); 53 Jeffery Asare (Austria); 57 Dominic Spielmann (Austria); 59 Gerd Mitterdorfer C (Italy); 70 Michael Habetin (Austria); 72 Tony Koskinen RT (Finland); 73 Tobias Url LG (Austria); 77 Daniel Claus (Germany); 78 Daniel Fankhauser RG (Austria); 79 Manuel Lortzing (Spain); Defensive linemen: 90 Manuel Jovic DE (Austria); 91 Derrick Brumfield DE (United States); 92 Laurynas Orlovicius DT (Lithuania); 93 Tinashe Jefferson Chawaguta DT (Austria); 94 Felix Ntwa DT (Austria); 96 Denis William Butz DT (Germany); 97 Nicolas Melcher DE (Austria); 98 Niklas Gustav (Germany); 99 Thomas Aronokhale DT (Austria)	Linebackers: 1 Ruben Seeber (Austria); 11 Alex Ferrari ILB (Italy); 29 Lucky Ogbevoen OLB (Austria); 33 Tim Unger (Germany); 48 Philipp Timmermann OLB (Germany); 55 Julian Perfler ILB (Austria); Defensive backs: 3 Jan Mayerhofer S (Austria); 5 Dominique Shelton CB (United States); 8 Christoph Nitzlnader CB (Austria); 9 Thomas Kugler S (Germany); 16 Arno Schwarz CB (Austria); 20 Patrick Pilger S (Austria); 21 Maxime Roger S (France); 23 Vincent Müller CB (Austria); 31 Tony Anderson S (France); 32 Sebastian Summerer S (Austria); 38 Lucas Veluire CB (France); Special teams: 18 Niklas Sanin K (Austria)	Rookies in italics Roster updated 05 June 2022; 4 A-import, 8 E-import, 39 homegrown 51 active

=== Transactions ===
From Cologne Centurions: Dartez Jacobs (January 10, 2022)

== Staff ==
Raiders Tirol staff
Front office: President – Elisabeth Swarovski; General Manager – Claudia Nuener; Head of player personnel – Axel Eder; Team Manager – Paul-Philipp Lasch; Head coach: Head coach – Kevin Herron; Offensive coaches: Offensive coordinator/wide receiver – Kyle Callahan; Quarterbacks – N/A; Running backs – Mike Gentili; Tight ends – N/A; Offensive line – Dominik Bauer	Defensive coaches: Defensive coordinator/defensive line – Jag Bal; Linebacker – Ryan Newell; Defensive backs – Lex Braga; Assistant defensive coach – Thomas Wolter; Special teams coaches: Special teams coordinator – Thomas Plattner; Assistant coaches: Head of video – Thomas Plattner; Strength and conditioning: Head strength and conditioning – Andreas Pröller; Assistant strength and conditioning – Elisa Ambach; Assistant strength and conditioning – Fabio de Santis; Staff updated 01 June 2022
