= 2022 Stuttgart Surge season =

American football club in Germany season

- Head coach: (Germany) Martin Hanselmann
- Home stadium: Gazi-Stadion auf der Waldau

Results
- Record: 0 – 12
- Conference place: 4th

Uniform

The 2022 Stuttgart Surge season is the second season of Stuttgart Surge in the European League of Football.

== Preseason ==
On October 22, 2021 the organisation extended the contract with head coach Martin Hanselmann. After further preparation and signings of coaches, the Surge held their open tryout on November 28, 2021 and signed the first player for the 2022 season in December 12, 2021 with former Frankfurt Galaxy Benjamin "Benji" Barnes. With former NCAA Division-II Truman State University football program starting Quarterback Randall Schroeder, the team signed its third American quarterback in their history.

== Regular season ==
=== Standings ===
Central Conference
Pos	Team	GP	W	L	T	CONF	PF	PA	DIFF	STK	Qualification
1	(Austria) Vienna Vikings	12	10	2	0	5–1	352	209	143	L1	Advance to playoffs
2	(Austria) Raiders Tirol	12	8	4	0	3–3	418	229	189	W1	Best 2nd place advances
3	(Germany) Frankfurt Galaxy	12	8	4	0	4–2	386	247	139	W2	
4	(Germany) Stuttgart Surge	12	0	12	0	0–6	113	451	−338	L12	

Source: europeanleague.football

=== Schedule ===
Week	Date	Time (CET)	Opponent (Note: Intra-Conference games are in bold text)	Result	Record	Venue	TV (Note: All games can also be watched live on ELF Gamepass) (Note: Viewers in brackets if available)	Recap
1	June 5	15:00	Barcelona Dragons	L 9 – 38	0 – 1	Gazi-Stadion auf der Waldau	Esport3, Eleven Sport	
2	June 12	15:00	Panthers Wrocław	L 26 – 28	0 – 2	Gazi-Stadion auf der Waldau	Polsat Sport, Eleven Sports	
3	June 19	15:00	@ Vienna Vikings	L 13 – 42	0 – 3	Generali Arena Vienna	Puls24, Zappn.tv	
4	June 26	15:00	Raiders Tirol	L 0 – 33	0 – 4	Gazi-Stadion auf der Waldau	Puls24, Zappn.tv	
5	July 3	15:00	@ Leipzig Kings	L 22 – 28	0 – 5	Bruno-Plache-Stadion		
6	July 10	15:00	Frankfurt Galaxy	L 20 – 26 (OT)	0 – 6	Gazi-Stadion auf der Waldau		
7	July 17	15:00	@ Panthers Wrocław	L 0 – 34	0 – 7	Olympic Stadium Wrocław	Polsat Sport	
8	July 24	bye						
9	July 31	15:00	Vienna Vikings	L 0 – 41	0 – 8	Gazi-Stadion auf der Waldau	Puls24, Zappn.tv	
10	August 7	bye						
11	August 14	15:00	@ Raiders Tirol	L 3 – 44	0 – 9	Tivoli Stadion Tirol		
12	August 20	18:00	@ Barcelona Dragons	L 62 – 8	0 – 10	Estadi Municipal de Reus	Esport3	
13	August 28	15:00	Leipzig Kings	L 0 – 38	0 – 11	Gazi-Stadion auf der Waldau		
14	September 4	15:00	@ Frankfurt Galaxy	L 13 – 37	0 – 12	PSD Bank Arena		

Source: europeanleague.football

== Roster ==
Stuttgart Surge roster
Quarterbacks: 1 Dante Vandeven (United States); 16 Michael Winterlik (Germany); Running backs: 3 Nicko Schuster FB (Germany); 6 Jean-Charles Moukouri (France); 10 Janis Hackenberg (Germany); Jalen Conwell (United States); 41 Bryan Yankson (Germany); Wide receivers: 12 Luca Faschian K/P (Germany); 13 Noah Bomba (Germany); 14 Frederic Latour (Germany); 17 Moritz Riedinger (Germany); 18 Paul Steigerwald (Germany); 25 Benjamin Barnes CB (United States); 85 Peter Weiblen (Germany); 86 Benedikt Lang (Germany); Tight ends: 88 Jens Walter (Germany)	Offensive linemen: 51 Marco Fischer (Germany); 52 Darnell Minton G (Germany); 60 Nathan Kalemba (Germany); 62 Elias Becher (Germany); 68 Thomas Ghebrezherer C (Germany); 71 Jan Steiger LT (Germany); 73 Robin Häberle (Germany); 78 Benhur Arya (Germany); 79 Lenny Sadzik (Germany); Defensive linemen: 49 Michael Muhozi Kimpiabi DT (Switzerland); 72 Darko Pisaric DT (Croatia); 75 Brice Ulrich Tchouadje DT (Ghana); 92 Tobias Burkhardt DT (Germany); 97 Philipp Ungericht DE (Germany); 98 Marcel Fürst DE (Germany); 99 Sercan Vardar DE (Germany)	Linebackers: 7 Paul Veritas OLB (France); 11 Ronley Lakalaka ILB (United States); 30 Til Becker OLB (Germany); 43 Osaruonamen "Precious" Ogbevoen ILB (Austria); 44 Japhet Mbala ILB (Germany); 45 Nijaz Hamulic ILB (Germany); 47 Nikolas Knoblauch ILB (Italy); 48 Tom Stickel ILB (Germany); 55 Dennis Gratza ILB (Germany); Defensive backs: 2 Malcolm Washington CB (United States); 19 Junior Nkembi S (Germany); 21 Julian Jakob CB (Germany); 22 Chaska Rémy Perron CB (France); 31 Nick Wenzelburger S (Germany); 32 Julian Ludwig-Mayorga S (Colombia); 33 Ben Wenzler CB (Germany)	Reserve lists: 8 Randy Schroeder QB (IR) (United States); 66 Adrian Gierczak OL (IR) (Germany); Rookies in italics Roster updated 9 July 2022; 5 A-import, 7 E-import, 38 homegrown 48 active, 2 inactive

=== Transactions ===
From Frankfurt Galaxy:

- Benjamin Barnes (December 31, 2021)
- Nikolas Knoblauch (January 16, 2022)
- Noah Bomba (February 3, 2022)
- Darnell Minton (March 7, 2022)
- Precious Ogbevoen (March 29, 2022)

== Staff ==
Stuttgart Surge staff
Front office: Owner – Steffen Korinth, Erwin & Martin Schmidt, Jakob Johnson; General Manager – Suni Musa; Head of football operations – Marco Kelleter; Head of sales & sponsoring – Timo Franke; Head of football operations/personnel – Jeremy Bryson; Head coach: Head coach – Martin Hanselmann; Offensive coaches: Quarterbacks – Martin Hanselmann; OC running/running backs – George Streeter; OC passing/wide receivers – Fabian Birkholz; Tight ends/fullbacks – N/A; Offensive line – Jürgen Rossmanith	Defensive coaches: Defensive coordinator – Andy Meyer; Linebacker – Mike Zeyda; Defensive line – Justin Bernthaler; Assistant defensive line – Timo Müller; Defensive backs – Marvin Washington; Assistant defensive backs – Lelan Brickus; Special teams coaches: Special teams coordinator – Jemil Hamiko; Strength and conditioning: Head strength and conditioning – N/A; Staff updated 9 July 2022
