= 2022 Frankfurt Galaxy season =

- General manager: Jörg Ziesche
- Head coach: (Germany) Thomas Kösling
- Home stadium: PSD Bank Arena

Results
- Record: 8 – 4
- Conference place: 3rd

Uniform

The 2022 Frankfurt Galaxy season is the second season of the new Frankfurt Galaxy team in the European League of Football.

== Preseason ==
After change in management and a new general manager with co-owner Christopher Knower the 2021 champion announced starting quarterback Jakeb Sullivan. Shortly after, the franchise re-signed local talent Lorenz Regler for the 2022 season. With effect from May 1st, Jörg Ziesche will be replacing Christopher Knower as general manager.

== Regular season ==
=== Standings ===
Central Conference
Pos	Team	GP	W	L	T	CONF	PF	PA	DIFF	STK	Qualification
1	(Austria) Vienna Vikings	12	10	2	0	5–1	352	209	143	L1	Advance to playoffs
2	(Austria) Raiders Tirol	12	8	4	0	3–3	418	229	189	W1	Best 2nd place advances
3	(Germany) Frankfurt Galaxy	12	8	4	0	4–2	386	247	139	W2	
4	(Germany) Stuttgart Surge	12	0	12	0	0–6	113	451	−338	L12	

Source: europeanleague.football

=== Schedule ===
Week	Date	Time (CET)	Opponent (Note: Intra-Conference games are in bold text)	Result	Record	Venue	TV (Note: All games can also be watched live on ELF Gamepass) (Note: Viewers in brackets if available)	Recap
1	June 5	15:00	Rhein Fire	L 26 – 29	0 – 1	PSD Bank Arena	ProSieben MAXX, ran.de, Arena4+, Eleven Sport	
2	June 12	15:00	@ Vienna Vikings	L 10 – 30	0 – 2	Generali-Arena Vienna	Puls24, Zappn.tv, Eleven Sport	
3	June 19	15:00	Panthers Wrocław	W 47 – 13	1 – 2	PSD Bank Arena	Polsat Sport	
4	June 25	17:00	@ Cologne Centurions	W 48 – 11	2 – 2	Südstadion	ran.de	
5	July 3	15:00	@ Raiders Tirol	L 17 – 23	2 – 3	Tivoli Stadion Tirol	Puls24, Zappn.tv	
6	July 10	15:00	@ Stuttgart Surge	W 26 – 20 (OT)	3 – 3	Gazi-Stadion auf der Waldau		
7	July 17	15:00	Cologne Centurions	W 46 – 14	4 – 3	PSD Bank Arena	ProSieben MAXX, ran.de, Arena4+	
8	July 24	bye						
9	July 31	15:00	@ Panthers Wrocław	W 30 – 29	5 – 3	Olympic Stadium Wrocław	Polsat Sport	
10	August 7	bye						
11	August 14	15:00	Vienna Vikings	W 42 – 8	6 – 3	PSD Bank Arena		
12	August 21	15:00	@ Rhein Fire	L 21 – 23	6 – 4	Schauinsland-Reisen-Arena		
13	August 28	15:00	Raiders Tirol	W 36 – 33	7 – 4	PSD Bank Arena		
14	September 4	15:00	Stuttgart Surge	W 37 – 13	8 – 4	PSD Bank Arena		

Source: europeanleague.football

== Roster ==
Frankfurt Galaxy roster
Quarterbacks: 6 Moritz Johannknecht (Germany); 7 Jakeb Sullivan (United States); 9 Jasper Small (Germany); Running backs: 22 Kai Hunter (Germany); 27 Thomas Fischbach (Germany); 32 Justin Rodney (Germany); 44 León Helm FB (Germany); 45 Max Schmidt (Germany); Wide receivers: 10 Timo Benschuh (Germany); 13 Marvin Rutsch (Germany); 15 Max Siemssen (Germany); 16 Niklas Schumm (Germany); 17 Reece Horn (United States); 19 Nico Strahmann (Germany); 80 Luis Moreno (Germany) 🇪🇸; 81 Janez von Renesse (Germany); 82 Hendrik Schwarz P (Germany); 83 Zinedin Bendjabou (Germany); 84 Cheikhou Sow (France); 85 Markus Hachenberg (Germany); 86 Lorenz Regler (Germany); Tight ends: 87 Kevin Mwamba (France)	Offensive linemen: 62 Lucas Hebel (Germany); 66 Francesco Runco (Italy); 71 Frank Atunlese (Germany); 72 Basil Weber (Germany); 73 Marko Vidović (Germany); 74 Sven Fischer T (Germany); 75 Joachim Christensen C (Denmark); 77 Yannic Kiehl T (Germany); 78 Tim Hirsch (Germany); 79 Kai Wullbrandt (Germany); Defensive linemen: 54 Karlis Brauns DE (Latvia); 55 Mamadou Sy DT (France); 90 Marc Anthony Hor DT (Germany); 92 Tim Göckus DE (Germany); 93 Thang Le Minh DT (Germany); 94 Cedric Udegbe DE (Germany); 95 Mete Konya DT (Germany); 98 Koku Antoine Giede DE (Germany); 99 Kevin Maier DE (Germany)	Linebackers: 40 Louis Achaintre ILB (France); 50 Calvin Schuld ILB (Germany); 51 Mark Andrew Adjei ILB (Germany); 52 Wael Nasri ILB (France); 53 Daniel Josiah ILB (Germany); 56 Sebastían Silva Gomez OLB (Germany); 58 Anthony Keith Williams ILB (Germany); 59 Thomas Albrecht ILB (Germany); Defensive backs: 14 Joshua Poznanski S (Germany); 18 Fernando Lowery CB (United States); 23 Maximilian Kranz CB (Germany); 24 Karim Ben El Ghali CB (Germany); 31 Konstantin Katz CB (Germany); 35 Marcos Schlabitz S (Germany); Ja'Len Embry CB (United States); Special teams: 1 Ryan Rimmler K (Germany); 6 Thomas Zampach K (Germany)	Reserve lists: 21 Gennadiy Adams RB (IR) (United States); 28 Simon Otto CB (IR) (Germany); 30 Falk Reuter S (IR) (Germany); 41 Sebastian Gauthier OLB (IR) (Sweden); 61 Lars Hampel OL (IR) (Germany); 65 Malcom Müller OL (IR) (Germany); 97 Sven Rieger DT (IR) (Germany); Rookies in italics Roster updated 25 June 2022; 4 A-import, 7 E-import, 47 homegrown 57 active, 7 inactive

=== Transactions ===
From Berlin Thunder: Louis Achaintre, Wael Nasri (February 4, 2022)

Jermaine Brealy Jr. was released after the first regular season game.

== Staff ==
Frankfurt Galaxy staff
Front office: Owner – B.G.A. Football Betriebs GmbH (i.a. Christopher Knower, David Knower, Kösling, Eric Reutemann, James McGoldrick, Dr. Jörg Zirener); CEO – Christopher Knower; General manager – Jörg Ziesche; Cheer Director & Coach –; Head coach: Head coach – Thomas Kösling; Offensive coaches: Offensive coordinator – Patrick Griesheimer; Quarterbacks – Andy McMillan; Running backs – Roscoe Baptist; Assistant running backs – Ramin Chaban; Wide receivers – Guido Reuels; Assistant wide receivers – Johannes Rübsamen; Tight ends – Florian Bambuch; Offensive line – Pascal Abt	Defensive coaches: Defensive coordinator – Thomas Kösling; Linebacker – Martin Latka; Defensive line – Kai Schlegel; Assistant defensive line – Ralf Horn; Assistant defensive line – Milan Misic; Defensive backs/assist. DC – Adrian Hensel; Assistant defensive backs – Dennis Nicholas Kozak; Assistant defensive backs – Max Zaher; Defense scheme assistant – Daniel Garcia; Special teams coaches: Special teams coordinator – Kai Schlegel; Special teams assistant – Kay Schulmeyer; Strength and conditioning: Athletic trainer – Scott McNeil; Athletic trainer – Jonas Riess; Staff updated 01 May 2022
