= Seantavius Jones =

American gridiron football player (born 1992)

Profile
- Position: Wide receiver

Personal information
- Born: August 9, 1992 (age 34); Tucker, Georgia, U.S.
- Listed height: 6 ft 3 in (1.91 m)
- Listed weight: 210 lb (95 kg)

Career information
- High school: Tucker
- College: Valdosta State
- NFL draft: 2014: undrafted

Career history
- New Orleans Saints (2014–2015); Philadelphia Eagles (2016)*; Kansas City Chiefs (2016–2017)*; Indianapolis Colts (2018)*; Atlanta Legends (2019); Tampa Bay Vipers (2020); Berlin Thunder (2021); Ottawa Redblacks (2022)*; Leipzig Kings (2022); Jefes de Ciudad Juárez (2023); Georgia Force (2024)
- * Offseason or practice squad member only

Awards and highlights
- NCAA Division II national champion (2012); 2× First-team All-GSC (2012, 2013)
- Stats at Pro Football Reference

Seantavius Jones (born August 9, 1992) is an American professional football wide receiver. He was signed by the New Orleans Saints as an undrafted free agent in 2014. He played college football for the Valdosta State Blazers. Jones has been a member of teams in six different football leagues: NFL, AAF, XFL, ELF, CFL and LFA.

== Professional career ==
Pre-draft measurables
Height	Weight	Arm length	Hand span	40-yard dash	10-yard split	20-yard split	20-yard shuttle	Three-cone drill	Vertical jump	Broad jump	Bench press
6 ft 3 3/8 in (1.91 m)	208 lb (94 kg)	34 7/8 in (0.89 m)	9 5/8 in (0.24 m)	4.53 s	1.58 s	2.74 s	4.32 s	6.96 s	38.5 in (0.98 m)	10 ft 5 in (3.18 m)	14 reps
All values from Pro Day

=== New Orleans Saints ===
On May 12, 2014, Jones was signed as an undrafted free agent by the New Orleans Saints. On August 30, 2014, he was waived by the Saints and signed to the practice squad two days later. On December 11, 2014, he was promoted to the active roster from the practice squad.

On September 5, 2015, Jones was cut by the Saints, but was signed to the team's practice squad the next day. On September 12, 2015, he was promoted to the active roster and was active for the 2015 opener against the Arizona Cardinals. On September 14, 2015, he was released by the Saints, but was re-signed to the practice squad two days later. On December 24, 2015, the Saints promoted Jones to the 53-man roster. On February 8, 2016, he was cut by the Saints.

=== Philadelphia Eagles ===
On February 18, 2016, Jones signed with the Philadelphia Eagles. He was released on April 4, 2016.

=== Kansas City Chiefs ===
Jones was signed by the Kansas City Chiefs. On August 28, 2016, Jones was waived by the Chiefs. On September 4, he was signed to the Chiefs' practice squad. He signed a reserve/future contract with the Chiefs on January 19, 2017. He was waived on September 2, 2017.

=== Indianapolis Colts ===
On January 2, 2018, Jones signed a reserve/future contract with the Indianapolis Colts. He was waived on September 1, 2018.

=== Atlanta Legends ===
On October 12, 2018, Jones signed with the Atlanta Legends of the Alliance of American Football. He recorded 24 catches for 298 yards by the time the league ceased operations in April 2019.

=== Tampa Bay Vipers ===
In October 2019, Jones was selected by the Tampa Bay Vipers in the 2020 XFL draft. He was waived on February 19, 2020, and re-signed on February 25. He had his contract terminated when the league suspended operations on April 10, 2020.

=== Berlin Thunder ===
He signed with the Berlin Thunder (ELF) for the new European League of Football's inaugural 2021 season.

=== Ottawa Redblacks ===
Jones signed with the Ottawa Redblacks of the Canadian Football League (CFL) on January 25, 2022. Jones was released as part of the team's final roster cuts on June 4, 2022.

=== Leipzig Kings ===
On June 9, 2022, the Kings franchise of the European League of Football announced the signing of Jones for a two-year contract as a replacement for injured running back David McCants. This marks his second stint in the two years of the ELF.

=== Jefes de Ciudad Juárez ===
On February 12, 2023, the Jefes de Ciudad Juárez of the Liga de Fútbol Americano Profesional (LFA) of Mexico announced the signing of Jones for the 2023 LFA season.
