= Paul Greifzu Stadium (Dessau-Roßlau) =

Football stadium in Germany

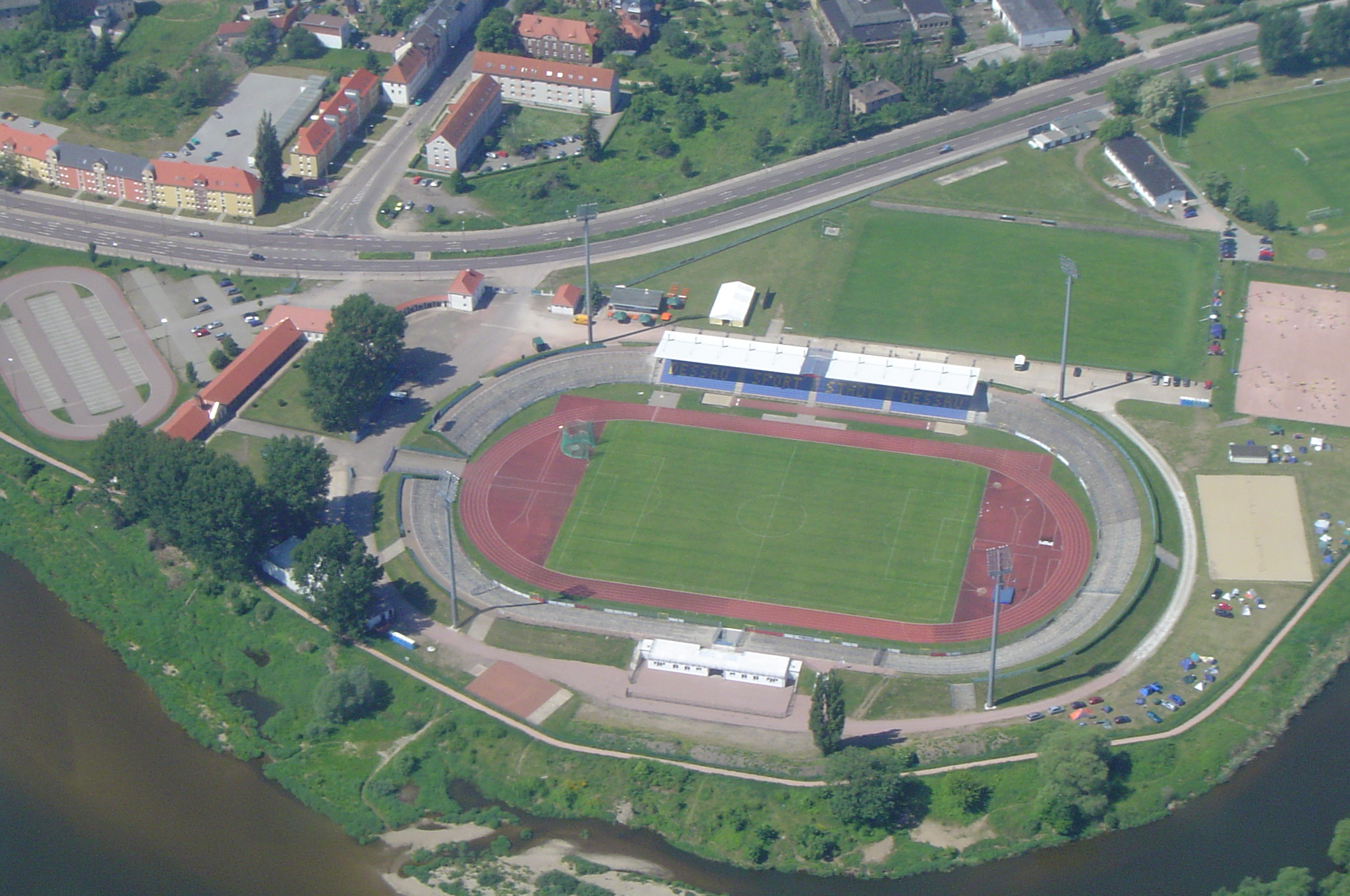
- Interactive map of Paul Greifzu Stadium
- Location: Dessau-Roßlau, Germany
- Coordinates: 51°49′26″N 12°15′06″E
- Owner: City of Dessau-Roßlau
- Capacity: 20,000 (2,000 seated)
- Surface: Grass
- Field size: 105 x 68 m

Construction
- Opened: 1952
- Renovated: 1997, 2002, 2004

Tenants
- SV Dessau 05 (Verbandsliga Saxony-Anhalt); Under-17 Football Championship (2009)

The Paul Greifzu Stadium is a multi-purpose stadium in Dessau-Roßlau. It is one of the most modern stadia in Saxony-Anhalt.

== Overview ==
Eight peace doves heralded the opening of the Paul Greifzu Stadium in Dessau in October 1952. It was named after German motorsport racer and constructor Paul Greifzu who had died in a training accident in Dessau in May that same year. The stadium had been built by voluntary work on dozens of tons of rubble from the ruins of Dessau. Altogether, 51,000 hours of work were spent to construct a 35,000 capacity stadium. It soon became a location for regional athletics championships. During the GDR era, little was done for the maintenance and preservation of the stadium. Only after German reunification, in the mid-1990s, did the city of Dessau develop plans for the remodeling of the stadium. In several steps the complex as renovated and expanded. An important innovation was the construction of complete facilities for track and field athletics. Had athletes had to be content with a cinder track, they now found a modern running track providing optimal conditions for competitions. The facilities were completed by providing for other disciplines, such as shot put, javelin throw, high jump, pole vault and discus throw. The first test for the new facilities came in 1998, when Great Britain, France and Germany U23 teams competed in track and field there.

Just a little later floodlights were installed with an illumination rating of 1,825 lux, one of the highest-rated floodlights in Germany. In 2002 a new west stand was constructed that provides for 2,048 covered seats. The last step of renovation to date was the construction of changing rooms and other operational facilities below the east stand, but further ideas for remodeling the complex exist. Altogether €6.7 million have been invested in the stadium since 1996, turning it into one of the most modern stadia in Central Germany.

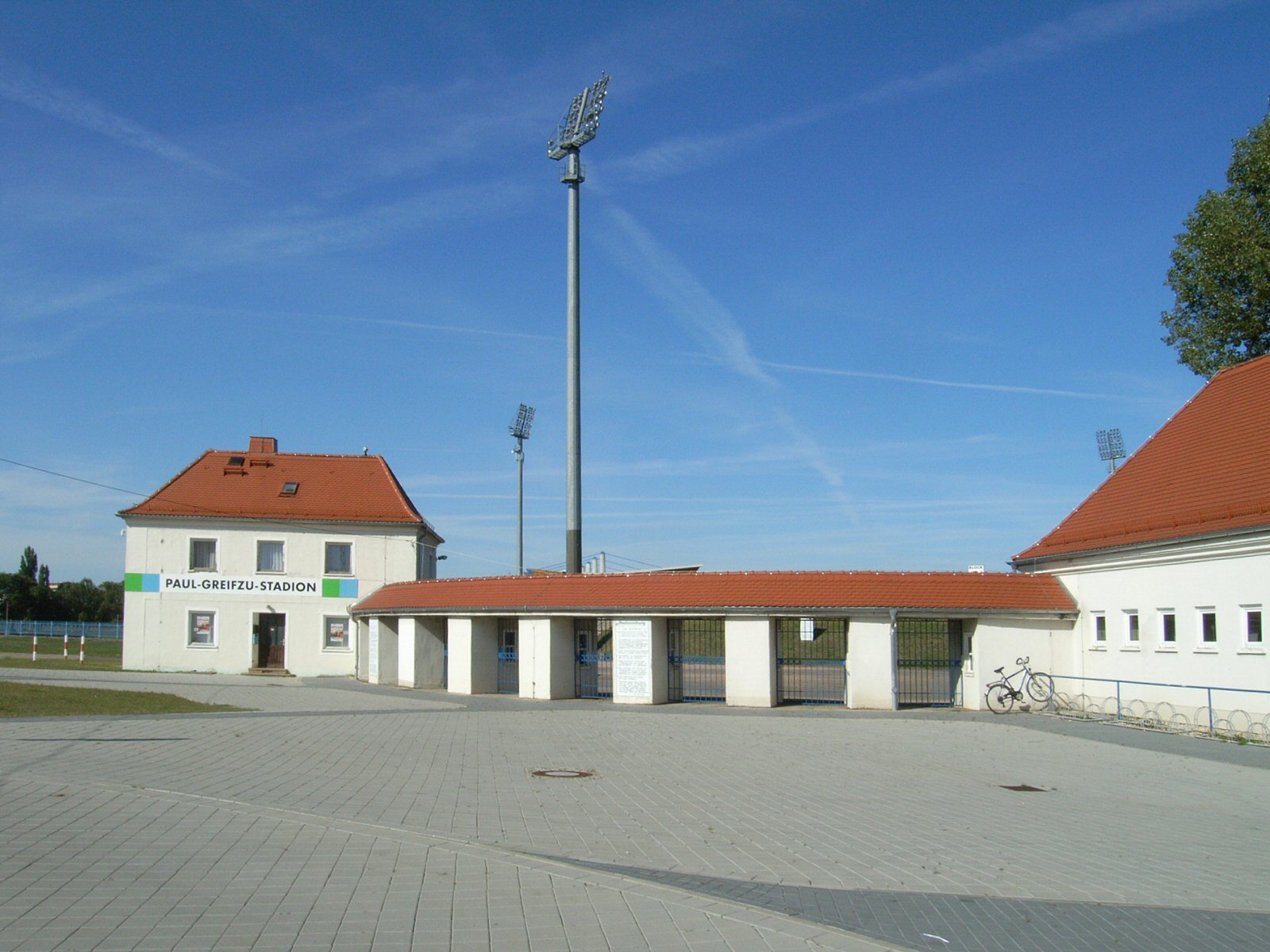
Entrance on Ludwigshafener Straße

Every year the Anhalt-Meeting is held in the Paul Greifzu Stadium, regarded as one of the best outdoor meetings in Europe by athletes such as Franka Dietzsch or Tim Lobinger. It is also the home of LAC Dessau, the local track and field athletics club. A number of major football teams have played in the stadium, such as FC Bayern Munich in a DFB-Pokal match against TSV Völpke in DFB-Pokal 2004–05 and a friendly against SV Dessau 05 in 2005. Leeds United A.F.C and Atlético Madrid played friendlies against FC Energie Cottbus in 2006 and 2007, respectively. Several matches of the now defunct DFB-Ligapokal were also held in Dessau, as well as several finals of the East German Cup, the FDGB-Pokal.
