= Stadion Hoheluft =

Football stadium in Hamburg, Germany

Coordinates: 53°35′14″N 9°58′11″E

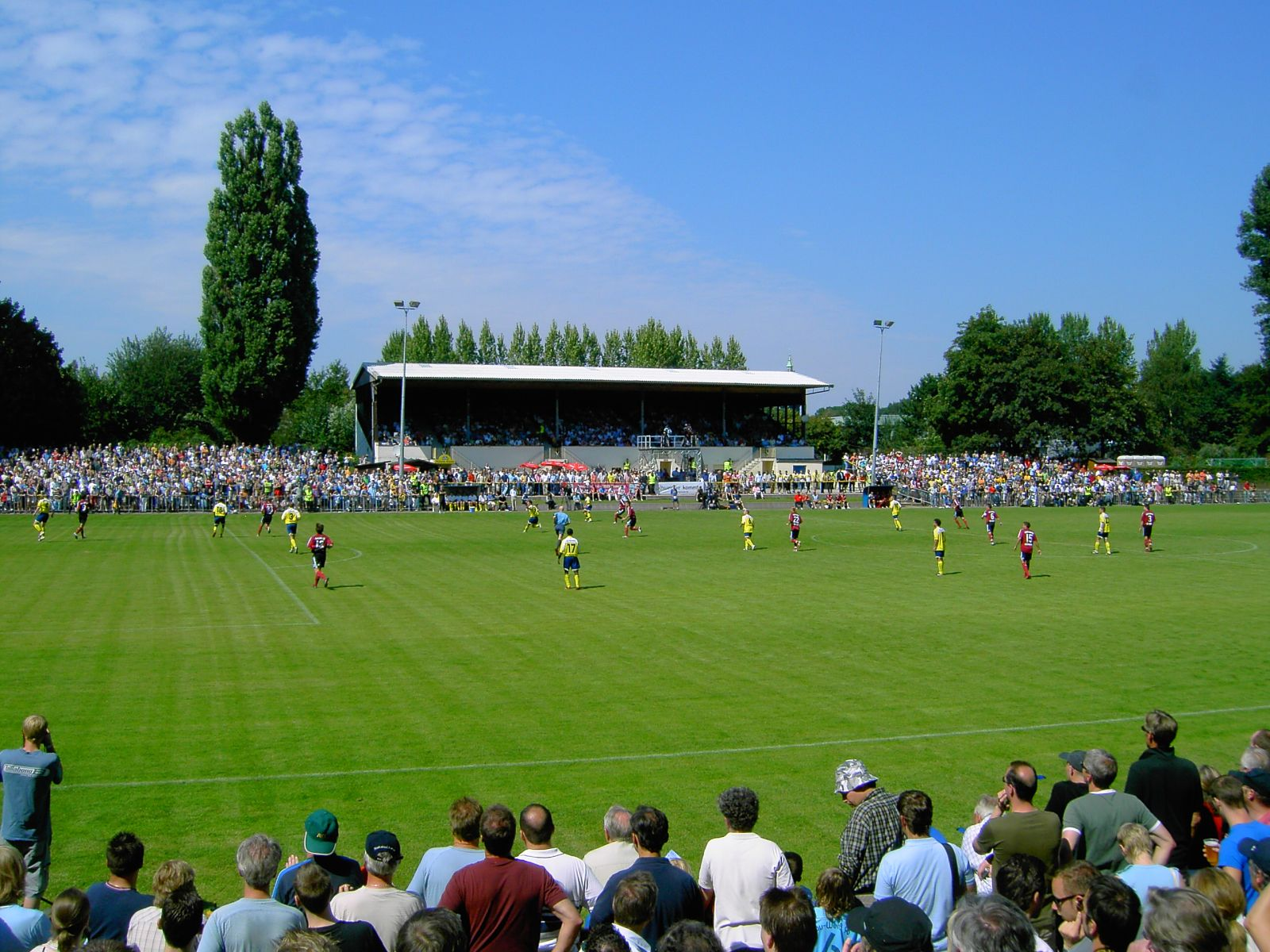
- Interactive map of Stadion Hoheluft
- Full name: Stadion Hoheluft
- Location: Hamburg, Germany
- Owner: SC Victoria Hamburg
- Operator: SC Victoria Hamburg
- Capacity: 37,000 (record); 11,000 (current)

Construction
- Opened: September 1907

Tenants
- SC Victoria Hamburg; FC St. Pauli II; Hamburg Sea Devils (ELF) (2021–2025)

Stadion Hoheluft is a Football stadium in Eppendorf, Hamburg, Germany . It is used as the stadium of SC Victoria Hamburg matches. The capacity of the stadium is 11,000 spectators. The record attendance for the ground was 37,000 during the final of the British Zone Championship in which Hamburger SV beat FC St. Pauli 6–1.

For the inaugural season of the new European League of Football the Hamburg Sea Devils (ELF) plan to play their home games at the stadium.
