= Iași Sevens =

Iasi Sevens
- Founded: 2008
- Location: Iași, Romania
- Stadium: Sandu Ville Gorun Rugby Stadium
- Colors: Grey, White and Dark Purple
- Head coach: Robert Cimpoesu
- Website: www.iasisevens.com

Uniforms
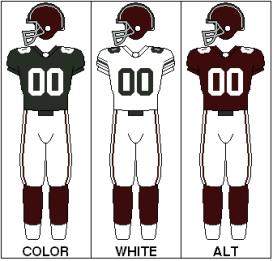

Iași Sevens is an American football team, based in Iași, Romania.

== History ==
The team was formed in January 2008. The first try-out and practice was held 3 February of that year.

== Objectives ==
The team states that their objectives are the recognition of American football as an official sport in Romania, and the creation and promotion of an internal championship.

== Current status ==
The team trains at the Ciurchi soccer stadium in Children's Park, Iași. The home games are played on Sandu Ville Gorun Rugby Stadium, Iași.

== Results ==
On 28 & 29 March 2009, Iasi Sevens has participated in the 4th edition of the Essonne Flag Event, that took place in Paris, France. The team finished ranked 10th from 12 teams, winning 1 game and tying another.

All the teams play and respect the NCAA football rules.

== Roster ==
Iasi Sevens Roster
Quarterbacks: 8 Carnariu Madalin; 5 Tudor Sarbu; -- Back-ups to be determined; Running backs: 21 Radu Gribincea; -- Back-ups to be determined; Wide receivers: 25 Cosmin Cuzic; 85 Marius Cojocariu; 81 Alex Stanuta; -- Alin Sava; -- Back-ups to be determined; Tight ends: 88 Stefan Bondariuc	Offensive linemen: 51 Robert Cimpoesu C; 69 Costin Popa RT; -- Iulian Lungu OG; -- Starters to be determined; Defensive linemen: 67 Vlad Iacob DE; 73 Laurentiu Dobre DE; 91 Dan Filip DT; 90 Ionut Ghenade DT; -- Starters to be determined	Linebackers: -- Stefan Dinu LB; 96 Adrian Guliciuc LB; 56 Marian Nedelcu LB; -- Victor Nastase LB; Defensive backs: 31 Alex David CB; 26 David Dorohoianu CB; 33 Cojan Ovidiu CB; 46 Catalin Cimpanu S; 22 Dragos Cretu S; Roster updated 2008-08-13; Players; Coaches

Color of the club	Name of the color
	Charcoal grey
	White
	Burgundy maroon

== See also ==
- Romanian American Football Federation
- National American Football Championship of Romania
- Romania national American football team
