= Cluj Napoca Crusaders =

Romanian powerlifting and American football team

Cluj Crusaders
Logo

General information
- Founded: 2010
- Headquartered: Cluj-Napoca
- Website: www.cluj-crusaders.ro

Personnel
- Head coach: Rafael Ruiz

League / conference affiliations
- CNFA

Championships
- League championships: 0; 4 (2012, 2013, 2017, 2018)

Current uniform
Home kit

Away kit

Cluj Crusaders is an American football and powerlifting team in Cluj-Napoca, Romania. It was the first official American football and powerlifting team, with legal status in Cluj-Napoca, founded in February 2010 by a group of American football fans. The Crusaders are the 2012, 2013, 2017 and 2018 Romanian American football champions and runners-up in the 2010, 2011, 2015 and 2016 editions of the National American Football Championship of Romania.

== History ==
Crusaders was founded on February 13, 2010, when they had the first training session together as a team, and the coach Rafael Ruiz met them face to face for the first time, finding only a group of individuals who did not know about American football, but had a desire to learn and become an organized team.

The first months were difficult, not having a field to train ans usually renting small synthetic pitches and having new people in training, without equipment (shoulder pads, helmets and training equipment).

After a month and a half of training, they had their first scrimmage (non-special teams) in Bucharest against the Bucharest Predators on April 10, 2010, which they lost without scoring a point and being stopped at the 1 yard four times. The final score is still uncertain.

After two weeks, the Predators came to Cluj on April 24, 2010, to return the visit with a scrimmage (special teams, but no extra points or field goals due to the absence of posts). The match was played on the field of Baciu in Cluj. The score was Bucharest Predators 24–6 Cluj Crusaders, Crusaders scoring their first points on a blocked punt.

In July 2010, the Crusaders became an NGO association and Club Sportiv Cluj Crusaders was born. In the same month, with Warriors and Lions, they began to organize the first National Football Championship (CNFA) being played in three stages, in Timișoara, Cluj and Bucharest.

The Crusaders played the first official match of the Romanian Championship against Timișoara Lions, winning 42–0, and scoring the first touchdown of a national championship with a kick off return.

The team participated in the first RoBowl and lost 51–12 the championship against the Warriors in November 2010.

In early 2011, the Crusaders created a powerlifting team. The first powerlifting contest was held in Cluj-Napoca with three weight categories giving medals to the top three places and the best lifters. It also started to develop relations with the Romanian Federation of Powerlifting, assisting in the Sub-Juniors National Championship 2011, where the coach Rafael Ruiz participated as a referee, having 12 years of experience as a powerlifter and referee.

On March 26, 2011, the first organized tryouts of the Cluj Crusaders to recruit new people took place, growing from a team of 19 in 2010 to 34 registered players for the 2011 season.

Cluj Crusaders was the first team in Romania offering insurance to players.

In an effort to promote more the sport, the team organized with Timișoara Lions a tournament that is expected to become tradition between these two cities, The Cupa de Vest. The first round took place in Timișoara and the final took place in Cluj-Napoca, where the Crusaders claimed victory and the cup.

In June 2011, Club Sportiv Cluj Crusaders officially became a sports club, receiving recognition from the Ministry of Sport and its Certificate of Sports Identity (CIS), the first organization involving American football to have a CIS making it ready for when the sport is recognized. Cluj was the first organization dedicated to powerlifting in Cluj and the first to join the Romanian Powerlifting Federation.

Cluj Crusaders participated in the National Powerlifting Championship in Timișoara on 3–4 September 2011 with two lifters, Flroin Oltean and Norbert Gero, who were the first lifters from the city to compete officially in a National Championship. They obtained four gold medals.

Due to the situation of American Football in Romania, the second edition of the Ro-Bowl took place as a cup, again between the Cluj Crusaders and Bucharest Warriors. In the first game at Bucharest, Crusaders lost 14–6. For the first time the Ro-Bowl final was in Cluj-Napoca, where the team was the first in Romania to have cheerleaders participating. In a tough game, Crusaders won the game 20–15, becoming the first Romanian team to defeat the Warriors. The difference in points made the Crusaders lose the championship, but this only gave more motivation to prepare for next year and at the end the team accomplish one of the primary objectives of the 2011 season, to arrive to the Ro-Bowl again.

With the season end, Crusaders started to prepare and co-operate in the organization of the Bench Press National Championship in Alba Iulia on November 26 and 27, 2011. Crusaders appeared in all the publicity offered by the Powerlifting Federation as a partner along with important institutions and companies. The club won gold and bronze medals in the 59 kg junior category and 74 kg junior category, respectively.

At the end of 2011 and a year full of accomplishments and growth, the club created the first edition of the Cluj Crusaders Awards, where the best players received awards for their performances throughout the year making the most important awards the "Crusader Award" given to the Most Valuable Player of the Year and the "Ironman Award" to the player who attended the most practices.

== National American Football Championship of Romania ==
=== 2010 season and RoBowl I ===
The first National American Football Championship of Romania started in 2010.

The first round was held at Timișoara in 24–25 July 2010. Saturday, 24 July 2010 was the official press conference about the first national American football championship. After Cluj Crusaders played with the host team Timișoara Lions opening the first official game of the first official championship. Although both teams are founded in 2010, Crusaders had a little more experience, most from head-coach Rafael Ruiz and that was seen in the game.
Crusaders scored in the first play, on kickoff return for about 75 yards KR TD, where Florin Oltean "took it to the house", for a 6–0 lead, having great blocking in front, Csaba Fulop #75 making a very good block. Florin Oltean #85 making history, being the first player to score in the first national championship, but he injured his collar bone at the end of the play, in the endzone. Florin also scored the 2-point conversion, being the holder for the extra point, not having time to put the ball to be kicked, he ran with it for 2 points, while having his collar bone fractured. The game ended 48–0 for Cluj Crusaders, but Timișoara Lions played a good game, missing some yards for a TD.
Points scored by:

- Florin Oltean #85 75-yard kickoff return TD, 2-point conversion Florin Oltean #85 scramble (8–0);
- Rares Gaia #22 20 yards Run TD, Extra point Paul Lucaciu #88 (15–0);
- Rares Gaia #22 12 yards Run TD, Extra point Paul Lucaciu #88 (22–0);
- Alex Bradea #42 SS Interception returned for TD, missed extra point (28–0);
- Rares Gaia #22 43 yards Run TD, 2-point conversion no good (34–0);
- Dan Crasnic #93 Interception returned 40 yards for TD, 2-point conversion no good (40–0);
- Cirja Paul #7 4 yards Run TD, 2-point conversion Cristian Nechifor #6 scramble (48–0);

Sunday, 25 July 2010, was the first round of flag games
First round flag football scores

The second round at Cluj-Napoca in 28–29 August 2010.
On 28 August 2010 was the second round of flag games:
Second round flag football scores
On 29 August 2010 two tackle games were held:
Bucharest Predators 50–0 Timișoara Lions
Cluj Crusaders 0–15 Bucharest Warriors
The game between Crusaders and Warriors had lot of action, both teams making big plays. Both teams playing their full potential, in the end Warriors experience made the difference. Crusaders almost had a TD, but Pop Radu #83 dropped a 25-yard pass in the endzone, several play later Crusaders FG attempt was blocked by Warriors DL.
Score Warriors 15–0 Crusaders.

- Pass TD Alex Craciun #52 from Cojanu Florin #8, extra point kick missed (12–0);
- Run TD Petian Florin Gabriel #37, 2-point conversion no good (6–0);
- FG Matache Razvan #9 (15–0);

The third round at Bucharest, Crusaders won 26–12 against Predators, this way they are going at the Romanian Bowl versus Warriors. Paul Cirja #7 scored 2 TD scramble and also passed 2 TD one to Florin Oltean #85 and one to Dan Crasnic #93.

The finals were held at Bucharest, on 21 November, flag championship was won by Scaieni Jaguars, second place Red Warriors, third Cluj Crusaders, fourth White Warriors. The tackle finals was won by Bucharest Warriors by 56 to 12, Crusaders being beaten on the running game. Crusaders touchdowns were scored by: Florin Oltean #85 on a kickoff return Dan Crasnic #93 long pass from Paul Cirja #7.

==== Standings ====
2010 Romanian Championship of American Football Season
	Team	W	L	T	PF	PA	STK
1	Bucharest Warriors	3	0	0	78	0	W3
2	Cluj Crusaders	2	1	0	74	27	W1
3	Timișoara Lions	0	3	0	0	98	L2
4	Bucharest Predators	1	2	0	62	87	L2

=== 2012 season and the first RoBowl win ===
2012 brought RoBowl III and the first title for Cluj Crusaders. Like in the previous year, the final was organised a 2leg format.

The first match took place Apahida, Cluj County, on the September 30th. This time Crusaders opponents were the Bucharest Rebels. The game was won by the visiting team 16–26.

On the 14 October 2012 was the second game of the final at Bucharest. Overcoming their chances, Cluj won 20–7 and with a combined score of 36–33, Cluj Crusaders became the first RoBowl winners outside Bucharest area.

=== 2013 season and the second RoBowl win ===
2013 was the first year of the National Championship to have both a Regular Season and Play-Offs.

Crusaders started their Regular Season with a 46–0 win in Bucharest over Warriors and concluded with an 8–0 victory against the 89ers in Timișoara.
The Play-Off matches were organised on the Cluj's biggest stadium Cluj Arena in a 2-day event.

In the opening day, the Bucharest Rebels defeated Bucharest Warriors 40–12 for the 3rd place.

On the 16 June 2013 took place RoBowl IV. Crusaders defended their championship title in a 14–8 victory over Timișoara 89ers.

== See also ==
- National American Football Championship of Romania
- Romanian American Football Federation
- Romania national American football team
