= Bucharest Warriors =

American football team in Romania

Logo

General information
- Founded: 2007
- Headquartered: Bucharest, Romania
- Website: www.warriors.ro

Personnel
- Head coach: Seremet Roman

League / conference affiliations
- CNFA

Bucharest Warriors is an American football team in Romania, founded in 2007 by a group of football fans from Bucharest. They started meeting in parks and other obscure places to fool around together with the Constanța Sharks, it is the first team to have brought the sport in Romania. The team has achieved 1st place in the editions of the National American Football Championship of Romania, 2010 and 2011.

== History ==
Because, prior to 2010, there wasn't any federation in the country to organize a national championship, Bucharest Warriors wasn't affiliated to any league and played only friendly games.

In 2010, the Bucharest Warriors was invited to its first official competition, the Central European Football League. On April 11, the Warriors hosted Istanbul Cavaliers in a qualification game for the respective competition. Also, one week after the game, Bucharest Warriors has begun their first campaign in an official competition organized by the EFAF, the Challenge Cup.

In the autumn of the same year, together with three other teams from Romania, the Bucharest Warriors have competed in the first-ever Romanian Championship of American Football. On November 21, 2010, in Bucharest, Bucharest Warriors met Cluj Crusaders, in the Romanian Bowl. The home team won the game, 56–12, becoming the first champion of Romania.

The Bucharest Warriors retained the CNFA title in 2011, after 14–6 and 15–20 against the same opponent from the previous year, Cluj Crusaders.

Bucharest Warriors has trained over 500 persons in American football in Bucharest, and helped various teams to launch in Bucharest and other cities. The club is devoted in building American football in Bucharest and Romania and has initiatives with fulfillment of its strategy.

== See also ==
- National American Football Championship of Romania
- Romanian American Football Federation
- Romania national American football team
