= 2022 Barcelona Dragons season =

American football team in Spain

2022 Barcelona Dragons (ELF) season
- Head coach: Andrew Weidinger
- Home stadium: Estadi Municipal

Results
- Record: 8 – 4
- Division place: 1st
- Playoffs: lost Semifinal vs. Vienna Vikings 12 – 39

Uniform

The 2022 Barcelona Dragons season is the second season of the new Barcelona Dragons team in the European League of Football.

== Preseason ==
After a moderate first season, their head coach Adam Rita announced, that he will not return to Barcelona and will become the new head coach of the Catania Elephants. On November 15, 2021, the franchise announced the re-signing of their first player with local hero Àlex González and later their first transfer with the signing of Eduardo Sánchez from the Panthers Wrocław. Furthermore, the management came to an agreement with the municipality Reus to use their stadion for the 2022 and 2023 season. On March 10, 2022 Andrew Weidinger was presented as the new head coach.

== Regular season ==
=== Standings ===
Southern Conference
Pos	Team	GP	W	L	T	CONF	PF	PA	DIFF	STK	Qualification
1	(Spain) Barcelona Dragons	12	8	4	0	5–1	364	225	139	L2	Advance to playoffs
2	(Germany) Rhein Fire	12	7	5	0	4–2	346	314	32	L1	
3	(Germany) Cologne Centurions	12	3	9	0	2–4	301	473	−172	W1	
4	(Turkey) Istanbul Rams	12	1	11	0	1–5	210	499	−289	L5	

Source: europeanleague.football

=== Schedule ===
Week	Date	Time (CET)	Opponent (Note: Intra-Conference games are in bold text)	Result	Record	Venue	TV (Note: All games can also be watched live on ELF Gamepass) (Note: Viewers in brackets if available)	Home Attendance
1	June 5	15:00	@ Stuttgart Surge	W 38 – 9	1 – 0	Gazi-Stadion auf der Waldau	Esport3	
2	June 12	15:00	@ Hamburg Sea Devils	W 24 – 21	2 – 0	Stadion Hoheluft	Esport3, ran.de ProSieben MAXX	
3	June 18	18:00	Cologne Centurions	W 34 – 32	3 – 0	Estadi Municipal de Reus	Esport3	980
4	June 26	15:00	@ Rhein Fire	W 17 – 13	4 – 0	Schauinsland-Reisen-Arena	Esport3	
5	July 2	18:00	Istanbul Rams	W 41 – 7	5 – 0	Estadi Municipal de Reus	Esport3	957
6	July 9	18:00	Vienna Vikings	L 20 – 27	5 – 1	Estadi Municipal de Reus	Esport3, Puls24, Zappn.tv, More Than Sports TV	1312
7	July 18	bye						
8	July 23	15:00	@ Istanbul Rams	L 19 – 22	5 – 2	Maltepe Hasan Polat Stadium	Esport3	
9	July 30	18:00	Rhein Fire	W 33 – 23	6 – 2	Estadi Municipal de Reus	Esport3	1043
10	August 7	bye						
11	August 13	17:00	@ Cologne Centurions	W 37 – 15	7 – 2	Südstadion	Esport3	
12	August 20	18:00	Stuttgart Surge	W 62 – 8	8 – 2	Estadi Municipal de Reus	Esport3	897
13	August 28	15:00	@ Vienna Vikings	L 18 – 24	8 – 3	Generali-Arena Vienna	Esport3	
14	September 3	18:00	Hamburg Sea Devils	L 21 – 24	8 – 4	Estadi Municipal de Reus	Esport3	963

Source: europeanleague.football

== Play-offs ==
Semifinals
1	(Germany) Hamburg Sea Devils	19
4	(Austria) Tirol Raiders	7
2	(Austria) Vienna Vikings	39
3	(Spain) Barcelona Dragons	12

Championship Game
1	(Germany) Hamburg Sea Devils	15
2	(Austria) Vienna Vikings	27

== Attendance ==
As of September 04, 2022

Pos	Team	Total	High	Low	Average	Change
11	Barcelona Dragons	6,152	1,312	897	1,025	−11.9%
	League total	230,391	12,055	300	3,200	+77.5%

== Roster ==
2022 Barcelona Dragons roster
Quarterbacks: 1 Zach Edwards (United States); 14 Sergio Barbero (Spain); OUT Bartolome Flaquer (Spain); Running backs: 3 Adrián Jiménez (Spain); 21 Antoni Montón (Spain); 34 Elías Rodríguez (Spain); Wide receivers: 12 Benjamin Plu (France); 15 Mario Flores (Spain); 17 Kyle Sweet (United States); 80 Jordi Torrededia (Spain); 82 Guillem Visent (Spain); 88 Roque Alarcón (Spain); 85 Arnau Casamor (Spain); OUT Luis Sanchez (Spain); Tight ends: 24 Javier Castañón (Spain); 87 Igor Mašlanka (Slovenia); OUT Ruben Quintana (Spain)	Offensive linemen: 60 Celestin Ngimbi (Spain); 64 Elvys Núñez (Spain); 70 Mikel Gómez (Spain); 68 Alan Mark Sousa (Spain); 72 Jose Ariza (Spain); 77 Gabriel Rodríguez (Spain); 79 Eduardo Sánchez (Spain); 65 Miguel Angel Kabankaya (Spain); OUT Mathias Hummelmose (Denmark); Defensive linemen: 11 Alejandro Fernández DE (Spain); 73 Sebastian Bowen DT (Spain); 99 Yago Rivero DE (Spain); 98 Edwin Elio DT (France); 90 Daniel Franco DT (Spain); 93 Alberto Del Cerro DE (Spain); 52 Michael Sam DE (United States); OUT Junior Varela DT (Spain); OUT Aron Sola DE (Spain)	Linebackers: 7 Anthony Rodrigues OLB (France); 10 Cesare Brugnani OLB (Spain); 43 Víctor Albarracín ILB (Spain); 45 Álex "Posito" González ILB (Spain); 49 Sebastián Castañer ILB (Spain); 55 Adrián Novella ILB (Spain); OUT Joel Cabre LB (Spain); Defensive backs: 4 Jairus Moll CB (United States); 5 Jorge Félix Velasco S (Spain); 13 Joan Carles Bartra S (Spain); 20 Lucas Masero CB (Spain); 22 Lautaro Frecha S 🇦🇷; 23 Jordi Brugnani CB (Spain); 25 Niko Lester FS 🇩🇪; 26 Cesar Sawane CB (Spain); 27 Andy Vera CB (Spain); OUT Shawn Wilson CB (United States); Special teams: 6 Luis Cereceda P (Spain); 8 Giorgio Tavecchio K (Italy); 53 Josep Tricas LS (Spain)	Practice squad: 42 Raúl Hernández TE (Spain); Rookies in italics Roster updated 23 June 2022; 4 A-import, 7 E-import, 37 homegrown 47 active, 1 practice squad

== Awards ==
=== ELF Honors 2022 Awards ===
Player	Position	Award
Andrew Weidinger (United States)	HC	Coach of the year
Kyle Sweet (United States)	WR	Offensive Player of the year

=== ELF All Stars Awards ===
Player	Position	Award
Kyle Sweet (United States)	WR	All Stars 1st Team
Alejandro Fernandez (Spain)	Edge	All Stars 1st Team
Zach Edwards (United States)	QB	All Stars 2nd Team
Michael Sam (United States)	Edge	All Stars 2nd Team

=== ELF Honors 2022. Nominees ===
Player	Position	Award
Zach Edwards (United States)	QB	Season MVP
Andrew Weidinger (United States)	HC	Coach of the year
Zach Edwards (United States)	QB	Offensive Player of the year
Kyle Sweet (United States)	WR	Offensive Player of the year
Alejandro Fernandez (Spain)	DE	Defensive Player of the year

=== MVP of the Week ===
Week	Player	Position	Team	Stat
2	Zach Edwards (United States)	QB	Barcelona Dragons	3 TD, 1 Int, 202 Yds passing, 108 Yds rushing
12	Zach Edwards (United States)	QB	Barcelona Dragons	7 TD, 0 Int, 321 Yds passing, 67,7 % pass comp

=== ELF Stats Leaders. Regular Season ===
Player	Position	Stat	Value
Zach Edwards (United States)	QB	Passes Completed	255
Zach Edwards (United States)	QB	Passing yards	3325
Zach Edwards (United States)	QB	Passing TD	36
Zach Edwards (United States)	QB	Longest TD Pass (yds)	95
Kyle Sweet (United States)	WR	Receptions	115
Kyle Sweet (United States)	WR	Targets	164
Kyle Sweet (United States)	WR	Receiving yards	1561
Kyle Sweet (United States)	WR	Receiving TDs	17
Alejandro Fernandez (Spain)	DE	Sack Yards	137
Alejandro Fernandez (Spain)	DE	Forced fumbles	7
Alejandro Fernandez (Spain)	DE	Fumbles Recovered	3
Niko Lester (Germany)	S	Longest Interception (yds)	97

=== NFL International Combine 2022 (IPPP) ===
Player	Position	Nationality
Alejandro Fernandez	DE	(Spain)
Gabriel Rodriguez	OL	(Spain)

== Statistics ==
=== Team Leaders. Regular Season ===
==== Offensive ====
Player	Position	Stat	Value	ELF Rk
Zach Edwards (United States)	QB	Passes Completed	255	#1
Zach Edwards (United States)	QB	Passing yards	3325	#1
Zach Edwards (United States)	QB	Passing TD	36	#1
Zach Edwards (United States)	QB	QB rating	101.02	#4
Zach Edwards (United States)	QB	Rushing Att	98	#11
Zach Edwards (United States)	QB	Rushing yards	549	#6
Zach Edwards (United States)	QB	Rushing TDs	4	#12
Kyle Sweet (United States)	WR	Receptions	115	#1
Kyle Sweet (United States)	WR	Targets	164	#1
Kyle Sweet (United States)	WR	Receiving yards	1561	#1
Kyle Sweet (United States)	WR	Receiving TDs	17	#1

==== Defensive ====
Player	Position	Stat	Value	ELF Rk
Alex "Posito" Gonzalez (Spain)	LB	Tackles Total	79	#16
Anthony Rodrigues (France)	LB	Tackles Solo	52	#8
Alex "Posito" Gonzalez (Spain)	LB	Tackles Ast	30	#23
Alejandro Fernandez (Spain)	DE	Sacks	15.5	#2
Alejandro Fernandez (Spain)	DE	Sack Yards	137	#1
Alejandro Fernandez (Spain)	DE	TFL	20.5	#3
Alejandro Fernandez (Spain)	DE	TFL Yards	152	#2
Alejandro Fernandez (Spain)	DE	Forced fumbles	7	#1
Alejandro Fernandez (Spain)	DE	Fumbles Recovered	3	#1
Jordi Brugnani (Spain)	CB	Interceptions	4	#5
Jordi Brugnani (Spain)	CB	Break Ups	10	#7

==== Returns ====
Player	Position	Stat	Value	ELF Rk
Jairus Moll (United States)	CB	Punt return Yards	146	#8
Jairus Moll (United States)	CB	Punt return Longest	27	#16
Jairus Moll (United States)	CB	Kickoff Return Yards	375	#12
Jairus Moll (United States)	CB	Kickoff Return Longest	54	#9
Jairus Moll (United States)	CB	Return yards Total	521	#9

==== Kicking ====
Player	Position	Stat	Value	ELF Rk
Giorgio Tavecchio (Italy)	K	FG Made	9	#5
Giorgio Tavecchio (Italy)	K	FG %	56.25	#8
Giorgio Tavecchio (Italy)	K	FG Long	46	#7
Giorgio Tavecchio (Italy)	K	PAT Made	39	#2
Giorgio Tavecchio (Italy)	K	PAT %	84.78	#2
Giorgio Tavecchio (Italy)	K	Kickoff Yards	4494	#4
Luis Cereceda (Spain)	P	Punt yards	1455	#4
Luis Cereceda (Spain)	P	Punt Long	69	#2
Luis Cereceda (Spain)	P	Punt Inside 20	7	#7
Luis Cereceda (Spain)	P	Punt 50+	3	#9
Luis Cereceda (Spain)	P	Punt Avg Yards	38.29	#7

== Transactions ==
=== In Season Roster moves. Players Signed ===
23 Jun: Sergio Barbero QB (Spain)

16 Jun: Jairus Moll DB (United States) , Josep Tricas LS (Spain)

4 Jun: Junior Varela DL (Spain) , Miguel Angel Kabankaya OL (Spain)

1 Jun: Michael Sam DL (United States)

=== In Season Roster moves. Players Released ===
2 Sep: Mathias Hummelmose OL (Denmark) , Junior Varela DL (Spain)

7 Jul: Aron Sola DE (Spain) , Joel Cabre LB (Spain)

30 Jun: Ruben Quintana TE (Spain)

23 Jun: Luis Sanchez WR (Spain) , Bartolome Flaquer QB (Spain)

16 Jun: Shawn Wilson DB (United States)

4 Jun: Jean Marc Ciocan DL (France)

31 May: Max Nazewicz LB (United States)

== Staff ==
Barcelona Dragons (ELF) staff
Front office: Owner – Big Ten Football SL; CEO/GM – Bartolomeo Iaccarino; Director football operations – Jesús Sánchez; Head coach: Head coach – Andrew Weidinger; Assistant head coach – Patrick Wennin; Offensive coaches: Offensive coordinator/quarterbacks – Andrew Weidinger; Assistant quarterbacks – Mónica Rafecas; Running backs – Patrick Wennin; Wide receivers – Victor Martin; Tight ends – Xavi Gonzalo; Offensive line – Giuliano Cattaneo; Assistant offensive line – Gonzalo Pérez	Defensive coaches: Defensive coordinator/defensive backs – Gabriel "Black" Sánchez; Linebacker – Raúl Saavedra; Assistant linebacker – Carla Lasheras; Defensive line – Chase Baker; Assistant defensive line – Marc Aurellano; Special teams coaches: Special teams coordinator – Patrick Wennin; Strength and conditioning: Head strength and conditioning – N/A; updated 05 Junio 2022
