= National Football Championship =

National Football Championship may refer to:

== Association Football ==
- National Football Championship (Pakistan)
- National Football Championship (Bangladesh)
- Korean National Football Championship
- National Football Championship of Romania

== American Football ==
- College football national championships in NCAA Division I FBS
- NJCAA National Football Championship
