= 2022 Rhein Fire season =

American football team in Germany

2022 Rhein Fire (ELF) season
- General manager: Partricia Klemm
- Head coach: Jim Tomsula
- Home stadium: Schauinsland-Reisen-Arena

Results
- Record: 7 – 5
- Conference place: 2nd

Uniform

The 2022 Rhein Fire season was the inaugural season of the new Rhein Fire team in the European League of Football from Düsseldorf, Germany. For this season, the franchise played their home games in the Schauinsland-Reisen-Arena in Duisburg near to its headquarter.

== Preseason ==
After signing multiple coaches, the newly founded franchise announced the signing of their first player Sven Breidenbach for the 2022 season. In the following, the team planned to organise an invitational combine for December 18, 2021. In the 2022 preseason the management announced that former NFL Europe Rhein Fire head coach Jim Tomsula will also be the first head coach of the Rhein Fire in the European league of Football.

== Regular season ==
=== Standings ===
Southern Conference
Pos	Team	GP	W	L	T	CONF	PF	PA	DIFF	STK	Qualification
1	(Spain) Barcelona Dragons	12	8	4	0	5–1	364	225	139	L2	Advance to playoffs
2	(Germany) Rhein Fire	12	7	5	0	4–2	346	314	32	L1	
3	(Germany) Cologne Centurions	12	3	9	0	2–4	301	473	−172	W1	
4	(Turkey) Istanbul Rams	12	1	11	0	1–5	210	499	−289	L5	

Source: europeanleague.football

=== Schedule ===
Week	Date	Time (CET)	Opponent (Note: Intra-Conference games are in bold text)	Result	Record	Venue	TV (Note: All games can also be watched live on ELF Gamepass) (Note: Viewers in brackets if available)	Recap
1	June 5	15:00	@ Frankfurt Galaxy	W 29 – 26	1 – 0	PSD Bank Arena	ProSieben Maxx, ran.de, Arena4+	
2	June 12	15:00	@ Leipzig Kings	W 28 – 17	2 – 0	Paul Greifzu Stadium	ran.de	
3	June 19	15:00	Istanbul Rams	W 42 – 12	3 – 0	Schauinsland-Reisen-Arena	S Sport, ran.de ProSieben Maxx, Arena4+	
4	June 26	15:00	Barcelona Dragons	L 13 – 17	3 – 1	Schauinsland-Reisen-Arena	Esport3	
5	July 3	15:00	@ Hamburg Sea Devils	L 15 – 42	3 – 2	Stadion Hoheluft	ProSieben MAXX	
6	July 10	15:00	Cologne Centurions	W 17 – 3	4 – 2	Schauinsland-Reisen-Arena		
7	July 17	bye						
8	July 24	15:00	Hamburg Sea Devils	L 16 – 40	4 – 3	Schauinsland-Reisen-Arena		
9	July 30	17:00	@ Barcelona Dragons	L 23 – 33	4 – 4	Estadi Municipal de Reus	Esport3, ran.de	
10	August 7	bye						
11	August 13	15:00	@ Istanbul Rams	W 50 – 32	5 – 4	Maltepe Hasan Polat Stadium	S Sport	
12	August 21	15:00	Frankfurt Galaxy	W 23 – 21	6 – 4	Schauinsland-Reisen-Arena		
13	August 27	17:00	@ Cologne Centurions	W 59 – 37	7 – 4	Südstadion		
14	September 4	15:00	Leipzig Kings	L 31 – 34	7 – 5	Schauinsland-Reisen-Arena		

Source: europeanleague.football

== Roster ==
Rhein Fire (ELF) roster
Quarterbacks: 11 Matt Adam (United States); 12 Rohat Dagdelen (Germany); Running backs: 5 Julian Zorz (Germany); 20 Leander Carstensen (Germany); 21 Jason Aguemon (France); 23 Daniel Rennich (Germany); 28 Tyrone J. Alexander (Germany); 43 Patrick Poetsch FB (Germany); Wide receivers: 6 Timothy Knüttel (Germany); 10 Harlan Kwofie (Germany); 16 David Schüler (Germany); 19 Achim Bah (Germany); 86 Nathaniel Robitaille (United States); Tight ends: 82 Domenik Rofalski (Germany); 85 Silvan Barelds (Netherlands); 87 Florian Eichhorn (Germany); 88 Marvin Pludra (Germany)	Offensive linemen: 62 Marius Mohr (Germany); 66 Arnoud Holierhoek (Netherlands); 68 Nick Wiens G (Germany); 74 Philip Weinzierl (Germany); 75 Vojislav Hahn T (Germany); 76 Jonathan Peppler G/T (Germany); 77 Sven Breidenbach T (Germany); 79 Jan-Niclas Dalbeck T (Germany); Defensive linemen: 58 Justus Sleiman (Germany); 90 Remy Feltes (Germany); 92 Eric Adam (Germany); 93 Sebastian Fey (Germany); 94 Felix Siegert (Germany); 95 Christian Van Horn (United States); 96 Tyrese Owusu-Bediako (Netherlands); 97 Jason Chikere (Germany)	Linebackers: 4 Lukas Ruoss ILB (Switzerland); 32 Niklas Siegert ILB (Germany); 41 Alexander Sobotta ILB (Germany); 45 Martin Pinter OLB (Germany); 4Z Timo Jüngst ILB (Germany); 54 Maximilian Schmidt OLB (Germany); 55 Thomas van den Oort OLB (Netherlands); 57 Luis Fiedler OLB (Germany); 59 Emre Zengin MLB (Germany); Defensive backs: 7 Till Janssen CB (Germany); 8 Majan Jelvani CB (Germany); 9 Richard Grooten S (Germany); 20 Jannik Seibel (Germany); 22 Omari Williams S (United States); 24 Lars Schiefer CB (Germany); 25 Lasse Meyer CB (Germany); 34 Fabrizio Umetelli CB (Italy); 39 Adrian Kiernan S (Germany); Special teams: 2 Daniel Schuhmacher K (Germany); 14 Maximilian Eisenhut (Germany)	Reserve lists: 1 Daniel Duah CB (IR) (Germany); 47 Timo Jüngst LB (IR) (Germany); Practice squad: 13 Lesar Duran WR (Germany); 15 Jakob Bojko WR (Germany); 29 Rene Hanssen CB (Germany); 69 Joel Plum OL (Germany); Rookies in italics Roster updated 05 June 2022; 4 A-import, 7 E-import, 48 homegrown 57 active, 2 inactive, 4 practice squad

=== Transactions ===
From Cologne Centurions: Till Janssen (November 8, 2021), Alberto Trovato (November 14, 2021), Richard Grooten (November 17, 2021), Daniel Schuhmacher (November 26, 2021), Timo Jüngst (December 17, 2021), Patrick Poetsch (December 21, 2021), Nick Wiens (December 24, 2021), Jannik Seibel (February 4, 2022), Florian Eichhorn (February 10, 2022), Jan-Niclas Dalbeck (February 17, 2022)

From Leipzig Kings: Jason Aguemon (December 30, 2021), Timothy Knüttel (February 27, 2022)

From Stuttgart Surge: Marvin Pludra (February 23, 2022), Domenik Rofalski (February 28, 2022)

== Staff ==
Rhein Fire (ELF) staff
Front office: CEO – Martin Wagner; General Manager – Patricia Klemm; Head of football operations – (interim) Timur Beckmann; Recruiting coordinator & off. quality control – Timur Beckmann; Cheer Director & Coach – Nini Pohlmann; Head coach: Head coach – Jim Tomsula; Assistant head coach – Detlef Reck; Offensive coaches: Offensive coordinator/quarterbacks – Martin Tschurer; Assistant offensive coordinator – Lee Taylor; Quarterbacks – Steffen Breidenbach; Running backs – Oyeniran Olalere Odunayo Ojo; Wide receivers – Mario Schulz; Tight ends – Detlef Reck; Offensive line – Erol Seval; Assistant offensive line – Sascha Spils	Defensive coaches: Defensive coordinator – Jim Tomsula; Defensive backs/DC assistant – Jörg Mackenthun; Assistant defensive backs – Peter Schiefer; Linebacker – Detlef Zorn; Assistant linebacker – Thomas Innig; Defensive line – Erkan Pascal Hohenberg; Assistant defensive line – Erkan Tezkol; Special teams coaches: Special teams coordinator – Jörg Mackenthun; Kicking consultant – Stefan Nickel; Assistant coaches: Coaching fellow – Christian Warzecha; Strength and conditioning: Head strength and conditioning – Max Döringer; Athletic coach – Erkan Tezkol; Staff updated 22 May 2022
