= Turkish Gridiron Football First League =

American football league of Turkey

Türkiye Korumalı Futbol 1. Ligi
- Upcoming season or competition: 2026
- Sport: American football
- Founded: 2005; 21 years ago
- Organizing body: Turkish Rugby Federation
- No. of teams: 8
- Country: Turkey
- Most recent champion: İTÜ Hornets (2nd title)
- Most titles: Boğaziçi Sultans; Koç Rams (6 titles each)
- Broadcaster: TRT Spor Yıldız
- Level on pyramid: 1
- Relegation to: Second League
- Website: tkfl.org

The Turkish Gridiron Football First League (Turkish: Türkiye Korumalı Futbol 1. Ligi) is a professional American football league in Turkey.

== History ==
The development of American football in Turkey can be traced to the beginning of 1987, when U.S. Navy servicemen played a pickup game against Turkish students at Bogazici University in Istanbul. Boğaziçi Filler (later renamed Sultans) was founded in 1987, and the Bullets were founded in 1993 in Hacettepe (later named Red Deers after the university logo). Istanbul Technical (Hornets) and Marmara University (Sharks) teams were added during 1995-1996. However, the Marmara Sharks folded in 1998. In 2010, the number of club teams exceeded 13 and the number of universities over 24.

The first official match between two Turkish teams was played between the Boğaziçi Elephants and Istanbul Pistof in 1993. The Elephants won this match 28-0. The name Elephants was later changed to Sultans. After the 1995-1996 season, in line with the increase in the number of teams, the American Football League began to be organized according to the qualifying league fixture among universities. In the following years, the Hacettepe Red Deers, ITU Hornets, Marmara Sharks, METU Falcons, Ankara Cats, Gazi Warriors, Ege Dolphins, and Yeditepe Eagles university teams were also established. However, during these years, matches were played lacking the basic requirements of American football. The teams started buying proper equipment in 2001, and American football in Turkey took on a more professional structure. After the Bilkent Judges, Boğaziçi Sultans became the second team to have specialized equipment. The first match with this equipment was played in Ankara in 2001, with the Sultans winning 34-0. The Turkey American Football League was launched on 26 November 2005. Since the 2007-2008 season, American football competition has been played in two categories, the Professional League and the University League.

== Seasons ==
Season	Winning team	Score	Losing team	Venue	City	Ref.
2006 Amateur League	Hacettepe Red Deers	19–12	Başkent Knights	Beytepe Campus	Çankaya, Ankara	
2006	Boğaziçi Sultans	30–8	Ege Dolphins	İnönü Stadium	Beşiktaş, Istanbul	
2007	Hacettepe Red Deers	15–12(OT)	Gazi Warriors	Beytepe Campus	Çankaya, Ankara	
2008	Hacettepe Red Deers	20–14(2 OTs)	Gazi Warriors	Beytepe Campus	Çankaya, Ankara	
2009	Boğaziçi Sultans	22–20	Istanbul Cavaliers	Vefa Stadium	Fatih, Istanbul	
2010	Istanbul Cavaliers	18–13	Gazi Warriors	Bulvarspor Stadium	Kartal, Istanbul	
2011	Gazi Warriors	41–38(6 OTs)	Boğaziçi Sultans	Sakarya Atatürk Stadium	Adapazarı, Sakarya	
2012	Gazi Warriors	47–12	Hacettepe Red Deers	Cebeci Stadium	Çankaya, Ankara	
2013	Boğaziçi Sultans	39–23	METU Falcons	Ali Durmaz Stadium	Nilüfer, Bursa	
2014	Boğaziçi Sultans	30–23	Koç Rams	Maltepe Hasan Polat Stadium	Maltepe, Istanbul	
2015	Boğaziçi Sultans	10–7	Koç Rams	Marmara BESYO Stadium	Beykoz, Istanbul	
2016	Koç Rams	21–14	Boğaziçi Sultans	ITÜ Stadium	Sarıyer, Istanbul	
2017	Koç Rams	56–14	Sakarya Tatankaları	Yusuf Ziya Öniş Stadium	Sarıyer, Istanbul	
2018	Koç Rams	52–21	Boğaziçi Sultans	Olimpik Park Atletizm Tesisi	Başakşehir, Istanbul	
2019	Koç Rams	29–19	METU Falcons	Koç University Field	Sarıyer, Istanbul	
2020	Yeditepe Eagles	Season was cancelled due to the COVID-19 pandemic. (Note: Yeditepe Eagles was the team with the most points before the season was cancelled.)				
2022	Boğaziçi Sultans	17–14	Koç Rams	Maltepe Hasan Polat Stadium	Maltepe, Istanbul	
2023	Koç Rams	17–14	İstanbul Bisons	Olimpik Park Atletizm Tesisi	Başakşehir, Istanbul	
2024	Koç Rams	10–0	İzmir Halcyons	Hasan Doğan Stadı	Yenimahalle, Ankara	
2025	İTÜ Hornets	28–27	Koç Rams	Olimpik Park Atletizm Tesisi	Başakşehir, Istanbul	
2026	İTÜ Hornets	14–7	Koç Rams	SAÜ Kampüs Stadı	Serdivan, Sakarya	

== Teams ==
=== Türkiye Korumalı Futbol Ligi Teams (Pro League) ===
Club	Founded	City
Koç Rams	2004	Istanbul
Boğaziçi Sultans	1987	Istanbul
ITU Hornets	1993	Istanbul
Hacettepe Red Deers	1993	Ankara
Gazi Warriors	1996	Ankara
METU Falcons	1996	Ankara
Sakarya Tatankaları	2002	Adapazarı
Anadolu Rangers	1993	Eskişehir

== See also ==
- Begüm Kübra Tokyay (born 1993), Turkey's first female head official of American football.
