= Istanbul Cavaliers =

Semi-pro Turkish gridiron football team

- Sport: American football
- Founded: 2005
- Disbanded: 2012
- Location: Istanbul, Turkey
- Colors: Navy & White
- Head coach: Hayden Flowers (2008-2010), John Douglas Harper (2011-2012)
- Championships: TKFL: 2010

Istanbul Cavaliers was an American football team in Turkey. The team was a semi-pro club team in the national Türkiye Korumalı Futbol Ligi (TKFL, American Football First League of Turkey). It was founded in 2005. The team's head coach was Hayden Flowers for the 2008-2009 and 2009-2010 seasons, with the success of one championship and one runner-up record at the national level; his successor John Douglas Harper coached the team for the 2011-2012 season. Its colors were navy and white. The team practiced at the athletic fields of Maltepe and Fikirtepe, Göztepe on the Asian part of Istanbul. The club had three teams, A-team, B-team and U19 team.

In the 2005–06 season, the team finished 5th in the league. In the 2006–07 season, the team made the playoffs by finishing second place in the regular season in the Istanbul Conference, before it was eliminated by the Ege Dolphins 20–14 in İzmir in May 2007. In the 2007–08 season, the Cavaliers were eliminated in regular-season competition, and the team did not make to the playoffs. In the 2008–09 season, the Cavaliers had a 7–2 run, and qualified for the playoffs. The team played the 2008–09 season final but lost to Boğaziçi Sultans 22–20, finishing as the runner-up. In the 2009–10 season, the team won the championship title after a very exciting bowl game against Ankara team Gazi Warriors, with a score of 18–13. The team finished the regular season in the top spot with a 7–1 record.

In 2008, the Cavaliers won against the Bulgarian Team Sofia 28–0 in a friendly match in Sofia after winning by 22–16 in Istanbul. The team folded in 2012.
