= 2022 Cologne Centurions season =

American football team in Germany

2022 Cologne Centurions (ELF) season
- General manager: David Drane
- Head coach: (Germany) Frank Roser
- Home stadium: Südstadion

Results
- Record: 3 – 9
- Division place: 3rd

Uniform

The 2022 Cologne Centurions season is the second season of the new Cologne Centurions team in the European League of Football.

== Preseason ==
After the contract of head coach Kirk Heidelberg wasn't extended, the Cologne Centurions secured the services of Frank Roser. In September 2021, their league MVP Madre London re-signed with the Centurions for the 2022 season. However, in March 2022, he joined the Pittsburgh Maulers of the United States Football League ahead of the league's inaugural season.

== Regular season ==
=== Standings ===
Southern Conference
Pos	Team	GP	W	L	T	CONF	PF	PA	DIFF	STK	Qualification
1	(Spain) Barcelona Dragons	12	8	4	0	5–1	364	225	139	L2	Advance to playoffs
2	(Germany) Rhein Fire	12	7	5	0	4–2	346	314	32	L1	
3	(Germany) Cologne Centurions	12	3	9	0	2–4	301	473	−172	W1	
4	(Turkey) Istanbul Rams	12	1	11	0	1–5	210	499	−289	L5	

Source: europeanleague.football

=== Schedule ===
Week	Date	Time (CET)	Opponent (Note: Intra-Conference games are in bold text)	Result	Record	Venue	TV (Note: All games can also be watched live on ELF Gamepass) (Note: Viewers in brackets if available)	Recap
1	June 4	17:00	Istanbul Rams	W 40 – 38	1 – 0	Südstadion	S Sport, ran.de, Arena4+	
2	June 11	15:00	Raiders Tirol	W 49 – 46	2 – 0	Südstadion		
3	June 18	18:00	@ Barcelona Dragons	L 32 – 34	2 – 1	Estadi Municipal de Reus	Esport3	
4	June 25	17:00	Frankfurt Galaxy	L 12 – 48	2 – 2	Südstadion	ran.de	
5	July 2	15:00	Berlin Thunder	L 7 – 34	2 – 3	Südstadion	ran.de	
6	July 10	15:00	@ Rhein Fire	L 3 – 17	2 – 4	Schauinsland-Reisen-Arena		
7	July 17	15:00	@ Frankfurt Galaxy	L 14 – 46	2 – 5	PSD Bank Arena	ProSieben MAXX, ran.de, Arena4+	
8	July 24	bye						
9	July 30	15:00	@ Berlin Thunder	L 29 – 39	2 – 6	Friedrich-Ludwig-Jahn-Sportpark	ProSieben MAXX, ran.de	
10	August 7	bye						
11	August 13	17:00	Barcelona Dragons	L 15 – 37	2 – 7	Südstadion	Esport3	
12	August 21	15:00	@ Raiders Tirol	L 20 – 45	2 – 8	Tivoli Stadion Tirol		
13	August 27	17:00	Rhein Fire	L 37 – 59	2 – 9	Südstadion		
14	September 3	15:00	@ Istanbul Rams	W 43 – 30	3 – 9	Maltepe Hasan Polat Stadium	S Sport	

Source: europeanleague.football

== Roster ==
Cologne Centurions (ELF) roster
Quarterbacks: 6 Jannik Nowak (Germany); 7 Alexander Frisch (Germany); 12 Jan Weinreich (Germany); 16 Tobias Jarmuzek (Germany); Running backs: 8 Dean Tanwani (Germany); 33 Toby Nick (Germany); 41 Denis Dauben (Germany); Wide receivers: 1 Quinten Pounds (United States); 5 Paul Lenhardt (Germany); 10 Justin Schelsinger (Germany); 11 Noah Aarass (Germany); 13 Jannik Loercks (Germany); 17 André Dickmeis (Germany); 18 Louis Geyer (Germany); 81 Valentin Rödiger (Germany); 85 Michael Ofosuhene (Ghana); 88 Shida Wang WR (China)	Offensive linemen: 56 Firat Aybek G (Germany); 59 Anton Glusancov (Germany); 60 Kevin Foitzik C/G (Germany); 65 Leon Savvas Michailidis (Greece); 66 Marius Faust (Germany); 71 Leander Wiegand (Germany); 72 Matej Bencek T (Germany); 73 Fabian Kratz (Germany); 74 Jan-Hendrik Koch T (Germany); 76 Niklas Meiworm (Germany); 78 Fred Weinreich (Germany); Defensive linemen: 3 Julian Völker DE (Germany); 6 Benjo Cerimagic DE (Germany); 46 Mark Scherenberg DE (Germany); 52 Alexander Boes DT (Germany); 90 Arkady Naus DE (Netherlands); 94 Chris Richardson Jr. DT (United States); 95 Jahn Jesus Lara Perez DE (Cuba); 97 Janek Wenke DE (Germany); 99 Junior De Souza Briele DT (Brazil)	Linebackers: 2 Tufan Yagmur ILB (Germany); 9 Sydney Kenea Amadu ILB (Germany); 30 Matthias Banjaqui OLB (Germany); 44 Marius Kensy (Germany); 47 Niklas Liesen (Germany); 54 Maximilian Oebels ILB (Germany); 55 Nikodem Henrik ILB (Germany); 57 Flamur Simon OLB (Germany); Defensive backs: 4 Kalon Beverly CB (United States); 19 Waheed Bhikh CB (Germany); 20 Jan Mika Hesseln (Germany); 21 Sango-Erume Vogel CB (Germany); 22 Paul Steffen (Germany); 23 Ibrahim Eldewieh CB (Netherlands); 27 Lucas Richter S (Germany); 29 Efekan Akgün CB (Germany); 31 Dani Lamy CB (Belgium); 32 Chad Walrond S (United Kingdom); Marvin Djopa (Germany); Special teams: 15 Jens Appelt P/K (Germany)	Reserve lists: 14 Ramin Akhlaghi WR (IR) (Germany); 58 Lennart Weitz OLB (IR) (Germany); 87 Laurin Wiegand TE (IR) (Germany); Marius Riepe CB (IR) (Germany); Rookies in italics Roster updated 25 June 2022; 3 A-import, 9 E-import, 48 homegrown 60 active

=== Transactions ===
From Stuttgart Surge: Louis Geyer (February 21, 2022)

== Staff ==
Cologne Centurions (ELF) staff
Front office: CEO – Tillmann Stracke; General Manager – David Drane; Personnel coordinator –; Scouting coordinator –; Director of scouting administration –; Director of football/head coach administration –; Scouting consultant –; Head coach: Head coach – Frank Roser; Offensive coaches: Offensive coordinator/quarterbacks – Frank Roser; Running backs – Reginald Seabreeze; Wide receivers – Philipp Naßan; Tight ends – Chris Lihs; Offensive line – Shajan Nagatholy	Defensive coaches: Defensive coordinator – Javan Lenhardt; Linebacker – Eric Maddox; Assistant linebacker – Gerson Santos; Defensive line – Simon Gavanda; Assistant defensive line – Jörn Scholl; Defensive backs – Remo Schatz; Assistant defensive backs – Stephan Schacht; Special teams coaches: Special teams – Chris Lihs; Assistant special teams – Jörn Scholl; Assistant coaches: Coaching assistant – Mehdi Amiri; Strength and conditioning: Strength and conditioning – Kevin Speer; Assistant strength and conditioning – Lorenz Petri; updated 28 March 2022
