= Koç Rams =

Professional American football team in Turkey

Logo

General information
- Founded: 2004; 22 years ago
- Stadium: Koç University campus
- Headquartered: Istanbul, Turkey
- Colors: Red, white

League / conference affiliations
- Turkish Gridiron Football First League

The Koç Rams are an American football team in Istanbul, Turkey, which plays in the Turkish Gridiron Football First League. They also played in the 2022 season of the European League of Football (ELF), under the name Istanbul Rams.

== History ==
The Rams belong to the Koç University Sports Club located on the campus of Koç University in Sarıyer, Istanbul. Koç is the Turkish word for ram. The team was founded in 2004.

After promoting to the Turkish Superleague in 2013, the Rams have since made the Turkish Superleague Final game in 2014, 2015 and 2016. In 2016, they won their first Superleague Championship, defeating the Boğaziçi Sultans, 21–14. In addition, 2016 was their first year to compete in the IFAF Europe Champions League (a minor European competition held in 2014, 2015 and 2016). The Rams became the first Turkish team to ever win a Champions League game by knocking off the St. Petersburg Griffins of Russia. Then they went on to defeat the reigning champions the Carlstad Crusaders in Sweden, to become the first Turkish team to accomplish a Final Four Champions League berth. On the 21st of July that year, they participated in IFAF Champions League 2016 Final Four at Wrocław, Poland. They faced the Milano Seamen and lost 17–14 in the last second.

On October 15, 2021, the Istanbul Rams were announced as new franchise of the European League of Football and played the 2022 season. After that season they returned to the Turkish League.

Logo of the Istanbul Rams, used during the team's sole ELF season

== Stadium ==
The Rams play and practise at the Koç University. In the ELF they played their home games at Maltepe Hasan Polat Stadium in Maltepe, Istanbul.

== Honours ==
- Turkish Gridiron Football First League
  - Champions: (6) 2016, 2017, 2018, 2019, 2023, 2024
  - Runners-up: (3) 2014, 2015, 2022
- Central European Football League
  - Champions: (0)
  - Runners-up: (1) 2018
