= Kalon Beverly =

American football player (born 1997)

Profile
- Position: Defensive back

Personal information
- Born: December 2, 1997 (age 28); New Orleans, Louisiana, U.S.
- Listed height: 6 ft 1 in (1.85 m)
- Listed weight: 185 lb (84 kg)

Career information
- High school: Edna Karr High School
- College: University of Texas at El Paso
- NFL draft: 2019: undrafted

Career history
- Ottawa RedBlacks (2020); Cologne Centurions (2022)

Kalon Ryshun Beverly (born February 12, 1997) is an American former professional football defensive back. He played college football for the UTEP Miners football. He also played for the Cologne Centurions in the European League of Football.

== Early life and college ==
From 2012 to 2014 Beverly attended Edna Karr High School in his hometown, where he began playing as a safety for the varsity football team and was a member of the track team. In his senior year he switched to defensive back and recorded 26 tackles, six pass breakups and two interceptions in 12 games played.

Beverly committed to the UTEP Miners football program in the NCAA Division I Football Bowl Subdivision, where he played in all four seasons. In his junior year he earned All-Conference USA Honorable Mention.

=== College statistics ===
| Year | Team | GP | Tackles | | | | | | Interceptions | | | | |
| Year | Team | GP | Cmb | Solo | Ast | TFL | Yds | Sck | FF | PD | Int | Yds | TD |
|---|---|---|---|---|---|---|---|---|---|---|---|---|---|
| 2015 | UTEP Miners | 11 | 40 | 27 | 13 | 0 | 0 | 0 | 0 | 3 | 1 | 24 | 1 |
| 2016 | UTEP Miners | 10 | 41 | 24 | 17 | 0 | 0 | 0 | 0 | 7 | 1 | 0 | 0 |
| 2017 | UTEP Miners | 12 | 44 | 24 | 20 | 2.5 | 6 | 0 | 1 | 8 | 0 | 0 | 0 |
| 2018 | UTEP Miners | 12 | 47 | 36 | 11 | 2 | 11 | 0 | 0 | 6 | 2 | 2 | 0 |
| College total | | 45 | 172 | 111 | 61 | 4.5 | 17 | 0 | 1 | 24 | 4 | 26 | 1 |
Source: utepminers.com

== Professional career ==
Pre-draft measurables
| Height | Weight | Arm length | Hand span | 40-yard dash | 10-yard split | 20-yard shuttle | Three-cone drill | Vertical jump | Broad jump |
|---|---|---|---|---|---|---|---|---|---|
| 6 ft 1 in (1.85 m) | 191 lb (87 kg) | 32 1/4 in (0.82 m) | 9 1/8 in (0.23 m) | 4.58 s | 1.64 s | 4.57 s | 7.30 s | 31 in (0.79 m) | 9 ft 8 in (2.95 m) |
All values from personal Pro Day

After going undrafted in the 2019 NFL draft, the Buffalo Bills invited him to their rookie minicamp, but he was not signed. He then was signed by the Ottawa RedBlacks where he was on the roster for the entire year without collecting any statistics.

On March 9, 2022, the Cologne Centurions of the European League of Football signed Beverly for the last A-import spot of the 2022 season. There he reunites with Centurions head coach Frank Roser who was himself coach with the UTEP Miners.

=== Professional statistics ===
| Year | Team | GP | Tackles | | | | | | Interceptions | | | | |
| Year | Team | GP | Cmb | Solo | Ast | TFL | Yds | Sck | FF | PD | Int | Yds | TD |
|---|---|---|---|---|---|---|---|---|---|---|---|---|---|
European League of Football
| 2022 | Cologne Centurions | 12 | 42 | 22 | 20 | 1 | 4 | 0 | 0 | 13 | 2 | 28 | 0 |
| ELF total | | 12 | 42 | 22 | 20 | 1 | 4 | 0 | 0 | 13 | 2 | 28 | 0 |
Source: europeanleague.football

== Private life ==
Beverly has two brothers and majored in digital media production.
