= 2022 Istanbul Rams season =

American football team in Turkey

- Head coach: (United States) Val Gunn
- Home stadium: Maltepe Hasan Polat Stadium

Results
- Record: 1 – 11
- Conference place: 4th

Uniform

The 2022 Istanbul Rams season was the first and last season of the Istanbul Rams team in the second season of the European League of Football.

== Preseason ==
After announcing the participation in the ELF and changing their name from Koç Rams to Istanbul Rams, they presented their head coach Val Gunn at the October 20, 2021. Further additions to the coaching staff followed suit. The first player signings were introduced on November 2, 2021 with Zachary Blair. The Rams combine was held on the November 22, 2021.

They first announced Yusuf Ziya Öniş Stadium as their home field but changed to the Maltepe Hasan Polat Stadium before the season started.

== Regular season ==
=== Standings ===
Southern Conference
Pos	Team	GP	W	L	T	CONF	PF	PA	DIFF	STK	Qualification
1	(Spain) Barcelona Dragons	12	8	4	0	5–1	364	225	139	L2	Advance to playoffs
2	(Germany) Rhein Fire	12	7	5	0	4–2	346	314	32	L1	
3	(Germany) Cologne Centurions	12	3	9	0	2–4	301	473	−172	W1	
4	(Turkey) Istanbul Rams	12	1	11	0	1–5	210	499	−289	L5	

Source: europeanleague.football

=== Schedule ===
Week	Date	Time (CET)	Opponent (Note: Intra-Conference games are in bold text)	Result	Record	Venue	TV (Note: All games can also be watched live on ELF Gamepass) (Note: Viewers in brackets if available)	Recap
1	June 4	17:00	@ Cologne Centurions	L 38 – 40	0 – 1	Südstadion	S Sport, ran.de, Arena4+	
2	June 11	15:00	@ Berlin Thunder	L 7 – 41	0 – 2	Friedrich-Ludwig-Jahn-Sportpark	S Sport, ran.de, More Than Sports TV	
3	June 19	15:00	@ Rhein Fire	L 12 – 42	0 – 3	Schauinsland-Reisen-Arena	S Sport, ran.de ProSieben MAXX, Arena4+	
4	June 25	15:00	Vienna Vikings	L 0 – 49	0 – 4	Maltepe Hasan Polat Stadium	S Sport, Zappn.tv	
5	July 2	17:00	@ Barcelona Dragons	L 7 – 41	0 – 5	Estadi Municipal de Reus	S Sport, Esport3	
6	July 9	15:00	Hamburg Sea Devils	L 0 – 70	0 – 6	Maltepe Hasan Polat Stadium	S Sport, ran.de	
7	July 18	bye						
8	July 23	15:00	Barcelona Dragons	W 22 – 19	1 – 6	Maltepe Hasan Polat Stadium	S Sport, Esport3	
9	July 30	15:00	@ Hamburg Sea Devils	L 26 – 29 (OT)	1 – 7	Stadion Hoheluft	S Sport	
10	August 7	bye						
11	August 13	15:00	Rhein Fire	L 32 – 50	1 – 8	Maltepe Hasan Polat Stadium	S Sport	
12	August 21	15:00	@ Vienna Vikings	L 22 – 37	1 – 9	Generali-Arena Vienna	S Sport	
13	August 27	15:00	Berlin Thunder	L 14 – 38	1 – 10	Maltepe Hasan Polat Stadium	S Sport	
14	September 3	15:00	Cologne Centurions	L 30 – 43	1 – 11	Maltepe Hasan Polat Stadium	S Sport	

Source: europeanleague.football

== Roster ==
Istanbul Rams roster
Quarterbacks: 1 Isaiah Green (United States); 12 Yiğit Timer (Turkey); Running backs: 8 Taha Çokadar (Turkey); 18 Ege Altuğ Sankaya (Turkey); Berker Esme (Turkey); Wide receivers: 1 Alihan Ağaçkesen WR (Turkey); 4 Tolga Törün (Turkey); 6 Terryon Robinson (United States); 11 Ege Berk İnanç (Turkey); 13 Kaan Özer (Turkey); 16 Doruk Şut (Turkey); 19 Yilmaz Berk Güven (Turkey); 26 Efe Baran (Turkey); 80 Féli Manoka (Belgium); 84 Alp Burak Çamlıer (Turkey); Tight ends: 88 Emir Sarıyıldız (Turkey)	Offensive linemen: 51 Alper Kurtuluş OL (Turkey); 55 Orhun Akbudak OL (Turkey); 65 Bahadır Aslan (Turkey); 67 Ayberk Kurşunlu OL (Turkey); 70 Cevad E. Küçükşengün (Turkey); 72 Emre Dumlupınar (Turkey); 75 Sebastian Arenas (Australia); 76 Erdem Altun (Turkey); 77 Zafer Ceylan (Turkey); 79 Bahadır Akbaş (Turkey); İsmail Can Balta (Turkey); Sebastian Bal (Poland); Defensive linemen: 7 İlhan Efe Geyik DE (Turkey); 46 (France); 49 Marcus Tullio Lucas DE (Brazil); 61 Samet Bilgin DT (Turkey); 66 Muhammed Ali Kurutluca DT (Turkey); 68 Şerif Emir Dülger DT (Turkey); 92 Burak Karaçor DE (Turkey); 93 Abdullah Kilany DE (Turkey); 94 Sinan Cingilli DE (Turkey); 99 Berkan Zaimoğlu DT (Turkey); Mikail Tatlı DE (Turkey); Hüseyin Akay DT (Turkey); Burak Tatar DE (Turkey)	Linebackers: 2 Alperen Ünlü OLB (Turkey); 5 Ufuk Eren Özelçe DB (Turkey); 15 Talat Gökhan Buluşan ILB (Turkey); 23 Salih Özdemir OLB (Turkey); 40 Ahmet Cem Uğur ILB (Turkey); 42 Zachary Blair ILB (United States); 44 Ali Gündoğdu OLB (Turkey); 54 Ata Han Atılgan ILB (Turkey); 56 Onur Can Duzcu ILB (Turkey); Defensive backs: 3 Atilla Işık S (Turkey); 16 Caner Dündar S (Turkey); 17 Oğuzhan Ceyhan CB (Turkey); 20 Kürşad Pekün S (Turkey); 22 Emre Özdemir CB (Turkey); 24 Mateusz Dzioban (Poland); 25 Alperen Küçük CB (Turkey); 27 Jamarii Milliken CB (United States); 28 Darius Lewis CB (United States); 31 Yiğitcan Ferhat Ertür CB (Turkey); Nimet Han Aydın CB (Turkey); Talha Berçin (Turkey); Special teams: 32 Mehmet Furkan Sarıkatipoğlu K (Turkey)	Reserve lists: 11 Kris Wedderburn WR (IR) (United Kingdom); 43 Alpay Burak Tatar DE (IR) (Turkey); 50 Aykut Aslan ILB (IR) (Turkey); 63 Onur Boğan OL (IR) (Turkey); 34 Andre Whyte S (IR) (United States); Practice squad: Orhan Kırmızıoğlu S (Turkey); Rookies in italics Roster updated 4 August 2022; 4 A-import, 5 E-import, 45 homegrown 59 active, 8 inactive, 1 practice squad

== Staff ==
Istanbul Rams staff
Front office: Owner – Koç Holding; General Manager – Emir Can Kefeli; Scouting coordinator – N/A; Football operations manager – Doruk Örnekci; Gameday manager – Tezcan Kayalar; Import liaison officer – Can Batuk; Head coach: Head coach – Matt Lawson (interim); Assistant head coach – Mert Pala; Offensive coaches: Offensive coordinator/wide receivers – "Vacant"; Quarterbacks – Mert Pala; Running backs – Matt Lawson; Assistant running backs – Enes Üzümcü; Assistant wide receivers – Erkin Palaz; Tight ends/fullbacks – N/A; Offensive line – Tuan Berk Kılıçoğlu; Assistant offensive line – Sınan Erışen	Defensive coaches: Defensive coordinator/linebacker – Batur Kaplan; Assistant linebacker – Batur Kaplan; Assistant linebacker – Erhan Batuk; Defensive line – Kasey Crosby; Assistant defensive line – Batuhan Kamalıoğlu; Defensive backs - Andre Whyte; Assistant defensive backs – Kerim Uzun; Special teams coaches: Special teams coordinator – Mert Pala; Strength and conditioning: Head strength and conditioning – Kürşad Pekün; updated 01 June 2022
