= Boğaziçi Sultans =

- Sport: American football
- Year founded: 1987; 39 years ago
- Location: Bebek, Istanbul, Turkey
- League: American Football First league of Turkey; American football University League of Turkey
- Colors
- Head coach: Erdem Özsalih
- Team Captain: Ozan Bayrak
- Official website: bogazicisultans.com
- Championships: TKFL: 2006, 2009, 2013, 2014, 2015, 2022

Boğaziçi Sultans is Turkey's first American football team, founded in 1987 at the Boğaziçi University in Istanbul. Formerly named as Bogaziçi Elephants, the team improved their game by practicing with American soldiers, and played their first game against another Turkish team with Istanbul Pistoflar winning 28–0. The team's head coach is Erdem Özsalih. The team plays in the American football First League of Turkey and American football University League of Turkey.

== History ==
The Sultans were followed by other university teams such as Hacettepe Red Deers, İTÜ Hornets, Marmara Sharks and METU Falcons after 1993.

Players from these teams founded many other teams all around Turkey. Sultans won many championships and played a leading role in the development of American football in Turkey. Boğaziçi University International Sports Fest was the only football tournament in Turkey for years.

In Turkey, American football was played without protective equipment until 2001. The first game with pads and helmets was played in Ankara in 2001, and the Boğaziçi Sultans defeated the Bilkent Judges 34–0.

A federation was founded in 2005 and Boğaziçi won the first official title by winning the league final against the Ege Dolphins 30–8 in a game played at İnönü Stadium of Beşiktaş in Kabataş, Istanbul.

The Sultans won the title again in the 2008–09 season, and attended EFAF Challenge Cup in 2010. In their first ever game against a foreign team, Boğaziçi Sultans defeated the Bucharest Warriors 61–0 in Bucharest, Romania.

After losing against Gazi Warriors in the final and in the semi-finals in two years, Sultans won two consecutive championships in 2013 against METU Falcons and in 2014 against Koç Rams. Sultans reached up to 4 official national championships, which is the record for the country.

In May 2014 Sultans attended the first IFAF Europe Champions League and lost the only played game 39–8 against the finalist Serbian team SBB Vukovi Beograd.

In 2015, the Sultans topped the rankings within the nation and won the national championship, beating their rivals Koç Rams in the final and became the first team in Turkey to win three consecutive national championships.

Since 2015, the Sultans have made two appearances within the National Finals. The Sultans hold the most Championships by a team in Turkey.

In 2017, with the formation of the National Team, the Sultans have sent 16 players to the Turkish National Team along with three coaches: Erdem Özsalih - Head Coach, Ozan Bayrak - Assistant Head Coach, Alper Akbal - Assistant Offensive Coordinator.

Among the players sent to the National Team, Buğrahan Ünver, who had been playing for the Sultans since 2010, became one of the captains of the National Team and held an important role until his retirement in 2020. In 2018, the Turkish National Team defeated the Spanish National Team in Madrid, where the players from the Sultans played the most snaps.

Following the COVID-19 pandemic, the league has been suspended for the 2020–2021 season. To date, each team has only played one game. The Yeditepe Eagles, scored the highest points within the game becoming the 2020-2021 National Champions, which was awarded by the Federation.

The Sultans are now preparing to play in the 2021–2022 season and has drafted many retired players as coaches. Bartu Berat Sarıgül (Linebacker, Strong safety) who started playing for the Sultans in 2010 is now the Defensive Coordinator. Abdulgani Atalay (Quarterback) who started playing in 2008 is now the Offensive Coordinator. Erdem Özsalih (Tight End) who started playing in 2000 has been drafted to lead the team as the Head Coach. Buğrahan Ünver (Defensive End, Defensive Tackle) is now an Assistant Defensive Coordinator specializing in the Defensive Line, operating remotely. Yasin Can Parlak (Wide Receiver), who started playing in 2011 and retired in 2020, is also an Assistant Offensive Coordinator specializing in the Wide Receiver unit.

== Honours ==
- Türkiye Korumalı Futbol Ligi
  - Champions: (6) 2006, 2009, 2013, 2014, 2015, 2022
  - Runners-up: (3) 2011, 2016, 2018
