= Begüm Kübra Tokyay =

Turkish flag football player, American football referee (born 1993)

Personal information
- Nationality: Turkey
- Born: 1993 (age 32–33) Turkey
- Education: Başkent University; Gebze Technical University; Koç University; Karolinska Institute

Sport
- Sport: Rugby football; Flag football; American football

Begüm Kübra Tokyay (born 1993) is a Turkish female biomedical engineer, flag football player and a former rugby football player. She is a referee of American football, being the first woman in this role in her country.

== Playing career ==
In her youth years, Tokyay performed a number of different sports, including kickboxing, she liked much. She competed at the 10K run of Bozcaada.

In 2016, during her last year at Başkent University in Ankara, she watched a rugby football match at the campus of Middle East Technical University, and was impressed. She thought that this sport is just the right one for her. She started to play rugby football. After she learned that her university was about to form a flag football team, she wanted to be part of the founders of the girls' team, which was named "Lady Knights". She played both rugby and flag football tournaments for about four years. She left rugby football in 2020, and continued to play flag football. During the period of COVID-19 pandemic in Turkey, no sports activities were held. She became part of the college flag football team of Koç University in Istanbul when she started her PhD studies there. As the University League matches were reserved for undergraduate students only, she, being a doctoral student, was permitted to play in other competitions. She noticed that the flag football was played in Istabul by Fives while elsewhere in Turkey the variation of Sevens is common.

== Officiating career ==
Encouraged by a former American football player, who served also as an official of American football, she attended a course for officiating. She has been serving as a referee in the men's league since 2016 because there was no women's league of American football in Turkey.

In an American football match between Tekirdağ and Bandırma, she officiated for the first time as a referee (lead member of the officiating team), being the first woman to be in this role despite about more than ten woman officials. She is a member of the American Football Central Arbitration Board, and the chairperson of the Flag Football Central Arbitration Board at the Turkish Rugby Federation.

== Personal life ==
Tokyay was born in 1993.

She studied Biomedical engineering at Başkent University in Ankara, and earned a B.Tech. degree. For her postgraduate education, she worked on the "Chemical, Biological, Radiological and Nuclear Defense" thesis at the Molecular Biology and Genetics Department of Institute of Science at Gebze Technical University, and received a MSc degree. She then joined Koç University in Istanbul for her doctoral studies. She continues her research work as a visiting PhD student on fellowship for Electrochemical Biosensor Studies at Karolinska Institute in Stockholm, Sweden.
