= Gazi Warriors =

American football team in Turkey

- Sport: American football
- Year founded: 1996
- Location: Ankara, Turkey
- League: American Football First league of Turkey; American football University League of Turkey
- Colors
- Champions: TKFL: 2011, 2012

Gazi Warriors is the American football team of Gazi University in Ankara, Turkey. It was founded in 1998 by a few students, and competes in the American Football First League of Turkey and American Football University League of Turkey.

== Achievements ==
The Gazi Warriors became champion in the first season of the University League for 2007-08, winning over another Ankara team Hacettepe Red Deers, 36–18 in the final game at Beypete Campus in Ankara. In the 2010-11 First League season, Gazi Warriors won their first ever championship title after defeating the defending champion Istanbul team Boğaziçi Sultans in the final match with six additional periods at the Sakarya Atatürk Stadium in Adapazarı that lasted a record time of around five hours. The following season, the Gazi Warriors became for the second consecutive time champion defeating Hacettepe Red Deers 46-12 in the final match at the Cebeci İnönü Stadium in Ankara.
