= Yeditepe Eagles =

American football team in Istanbul, Turkey

- Sport: American football
- Founded: 2001
- League: Türkiye Korumalı Futbol Ligi
- Based in: Istanbul, Turkey
- Colors
- Head coach: Onur Durak
- Championships: TKFL: 2020

The Yeditepe Eagles are an American football team in Istanbul, Turkey.

== History ==
American football is rapidly spreading in Turkey in 2000 also introduced the floor Yeditepe University. "Yeditepe University American Football Team" was founded by Alper Özpınar, a research assistant at Yeditepe University, and he coached this team for 4 years. The name of the team "Eagles" was inspired by the "double-headed Selcuklu eagle" figure at the entrance of the engineering faculty of the university.

Yeditepe Eagles joined AFK in 2001 and bought its equipment at the end of 2001. Later, as a result of the separation of the organizations, Yeditepe Eagles, which has been competing in UAFL since 2003, started club activities with the establishment of the Federation in 2005.
