= National American Football Championship of Romania =

- Founded: 2010
- Country: Romania
- Number of clubs: 6
- Level on pyramid: 1
- Current champions: Bucharest Rebels
- Most championships: Bucharest Rebels (8 titles)

The National American Football Championship of Romania (CNFA) (Romanian: Campionatul Național de Fotbal American) is the elite league for American football in Romania. It was formed in 2010. Playing rules are based on those of the International Federation of American Football. Each end of season culminates with the championship game, known as the Romanian Bowl or RoBowl. The championship is currently organised by the League of American Football Teams in Romania (Romanian: LEFA - Liga Echipelor de Fotbal American din România).

The popularity of American football in Romania can also be attributed to the nation's interest in the career of Romanian-born American punter for the New England Patriots of the NFL, Zoltán Meskó.

== History ==
The league is played annually, and it follows IFAF rules. A flag championship is also organized every year, to better promote the sport.

The first-ever game in the history of the championship was played on July 24, and it featured the Timişoara Lions and Cluj Crusaders.

On November 21, 2010, in Bucharest, the Bucharest Warriors met the Cluj Crusaders, in the first-ever Romanian Bowl. The home team won the game, 56–12, becoming the first champion of Romania.

Bucharest Warriors retained the CNFA title in 2011, after 14–6 and 15–20 against the same opponent from the previous year, Cluj Crusaders.

Following the withdrawal of the Mures Monsters and the merger of the Timisoara 89ers and Resita Locomotives to form the Banat Team in 2024, the CNFA championship featured only four participating teams. The regular season followed a single round-robin format, with the Banat Team finishing at the top of the standings with three wins and a net point difference of +94 (124 points for, 30 points against).

RoBowl XIV was hosted by the Banat Team at the artificial turf field of Stadionul Mircea Chivu in Reșița. However, they were defeated by the Bucharest Rebels, who secured their fifth consecutive national championship title.

In 2024, the six remaining teams agreed to shift the championship schedule back to a spring and summer format, beginning with the 2025 CNFA season. The competition will take place between March and June.

For the 2025 season of the National American Football Championship of Romania (CNFA), four teams have registered: defending champions Bucharest Rebels, Cluj Crusaders, Mures Monsters, and Timisoara 89ers. The season will follow a double round-robin format, where each team will play every other team twice, once at home and once away. At the conclusion of the regular season, the top-ranked team will qualify directly for RoBowl XV, the national championship game. The second and third-placed teams will compete in a playoff game, hosted by the second-ranked team, to determine the finalist that will face the top seed in the championship match. The 2025 season sees the withdrawal of Reșița Locomotives and Bucharest Titans, reducing the number of participating teams to four.

In 2026 the league was not played. Bucharest Rebels and Bucharest Titans took part in the newly founded Danube American Football League.

== Teams ==
Current CNFA teams
Bucharest Titans
Cluj Crusaders
Mureș Monsters
Former / inactive teams
Bucharest Rebels
Bucharest Dacians	Reșița Locomotives	Bucharest Predators
Constanța Sharks
Iaşi Sevens
Miners Baia Mare
Oradea Stars
Prahova Thunder
Scăieni Jaguars
Vaslui Wolves
Bucharest Warriors

== Romanian Bowl ==
The Romanian Bowl is the championship game of the National American Football Championship of Romania (CNFA), the Romanian equivalent of the NFL's Super Bowl. The Bucharest Rebels are the current titleholders, having won the championship for six consecutive years.

#	Year	Winning team	Losing team	Score
I	2010	Bucharest Warriors	Cluj Crusaders	56–12
II	2011	Bucharest Warriors	Cluj Crusaders	14–6 & 15–20
III	2012	Cluj Crusaders	Bucharest Rebels	20–7
IV	2013	Cluj Crusaders	Timișoara 89ers	14–8
V	2014	Bucharest Rebels	Timișoara 89ers	18–12
VI	2015	Bucharest Rebels	Cluj Crusaders	2–0
VII	2016	Bucharest Rebels	Cluj Crusaders	46–18
VIII	2017	Cluj Crusaders	Bucharest Warriors	17–12
IX	2018	Cluj Crusaders	Bucharest Rebels	10–0
X	June 15, 2019	Bucharest Rebels	Timișoara 89ers	34–14
XI	November 27, 2021	Bucharest Rebels	Mures Monsters	40–30
XII	December 4, 2022	Bucharest Rebels	Mures Monsters	48–28
XIII	November 25, 2023	Bucharest Rebels	Resita Locomotives	34–28
XIV	November 23, 2024	Bucharest Rebels	Banat Team	48–19
XV	June 22, 2025	Bucharest Rebels	Mures Monsters	38–16

== See also ==
- Romanian American Football Federation
- Romania national American football team
- Official site
