= Hacettepe Red Deers =

Turkish American football team

- Sport: American football
- Founded: 1993
- League: American Football First league of Turkey
- Based in: Ankara, Turkey
- Colors
- Championships: 2007, 2008

Red Deers is the team of the Hacettepe University American Football Society. It was established in 1993 in Ankara, Turkey. Known as Hacettepe Bullets in the year it was founded, the community later changed its name to Hacettepe Red Deers, inspired by the symbol of Hacettepe University. Turkey's second football team, Hacettepe Red Deers; In the year it was founded, it took its first step into its career as the champion in the league between Boğaziçi Sultans, ITU Hornets and Hacettepe Red Deers.

== Honours ==
- Türkiye Korumalı Futbol Ligi
  - Champions: (2) 2007, 2008
  - Runners-up: (1) 2012
