= Romania national American football team =

- Romania

Home

Away
Association	FRFA
Region	Europe (EFAF)
Founded	2010
- IFAF Affiliation
Colors	Blue, Red, Yellow
Head coach	(Mexico) Rafael Ruiz
- General manager

The Romania national American football team is the official American football senior national team of Romania. It is organized by the Federaţia Română de Fotbal American (FRFA). It gets players from teams of the National American Football Championship of Romania (CNFA).

== See also ==
- Romanian American Football Federation
- National American Football Championship of Romania
- Zoltán Meskó
