= Romanian American Football Federation =

Sports governing body in Romania

- Formation: 2010
- Type: American football
- Headquarters: Bucharest, Romania
- Official language: Romanian
- Website: www.frfa.ro/

The Romanian American Football Federation (Romanian: Federaţia Română de Fotbal American) is the governing body of the sport of American football in Romania. Formed in 2010, the federation oversees the Romanian league system, the Romanian Bowl and the national selections.

== See also ==
- National American Football Championship of Romania
- Romania national American football team
