= Maltepe Hasan Polat Stadium =

Sports venue in Istanbul, Turkey

Coordinates: 40.9205°N 29.1313°E

Maltepe Hasan Polat Stadyumu
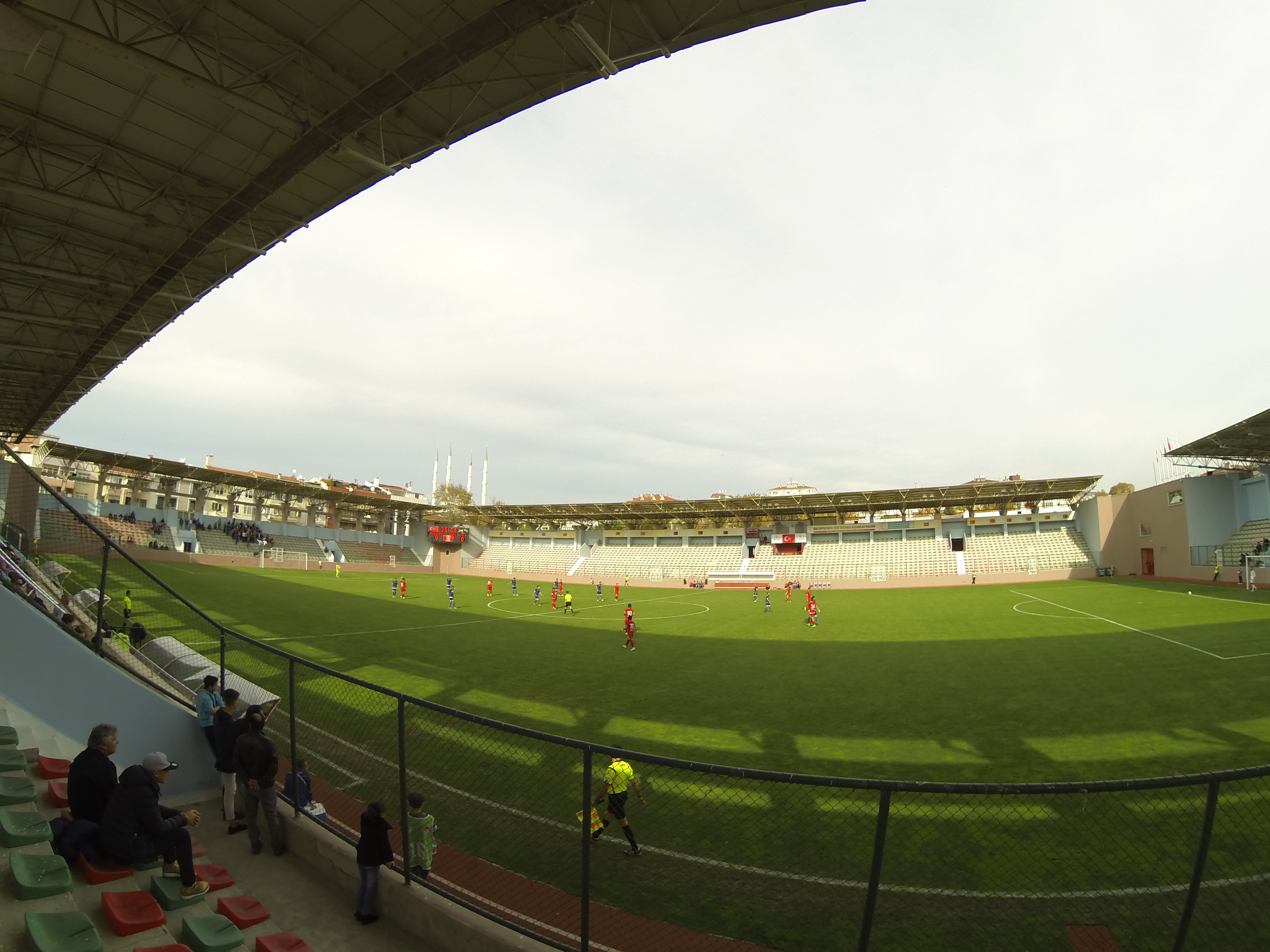
- Interactive map of Maltepe Hasan Polat Stadyumu
- Location: Maltepe, Istanbul, Turkey
- Owner: Ministry of Youth and Sports
- Capacity: 5,000
- Surface: Turf

Construction
- Groundbreaking: 1985
- Opened: 23 January 1988
- Renovated: 2001–2005

Tenants
- Istanbul Maltepespor; Beyoğlu Yeni Çarşı FK; Istanbul Rams (2022)

Maltepe Hasan Polat Stadium (Turkish: Maltepe Hasan Polat Stadyumu) is a public multi-purpose stadium in Maltepe, Istanbul, Turkey. The stadium's name honours Hasan Polat, late president of the Turkish Football Federation and former player of Gençlerbirliği S.K.

Istanbul Maltepespor and Beyoğlu Yeni Çarşı FK use the stadium for association football matches. In 2022 it was also home to the Istanbul Rams (otherwise known as Koç Rams) in their only season in the European League of Football.

== History ==
The stadium was originally built in the eastern Maltepe district along the Marmara Sea in 1985. From 2001 to 2005 it was relocated and constructed in dense urban area. In this time the stands finished first and were covered later. Later the stadium, which was closed due to renovations in the 2008-09 season, could not be put into use in the 2009-10 season due to the yellowing of the grass. The stadium has stands currently holding 5,000 people, has a meeting room for 30 attendencees, parking space for 55 cars and an electronic score board.
